= The Rangers (British battalion) =

Volunteer unit of British Army

40th Middlesex Rifle Volunteer Corps 22nd Middlesex Volunteer Rifle Corps (Central London Rangers) 12th (County of London) Battalion, London Regiment (The Rangers)
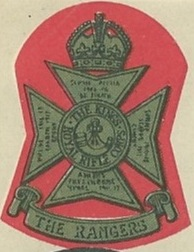
- Cap badge of The Rangers ca 1940
- Active: 1860-1960s
- Allegiance: United Kingdom
- Branch: Volunteer Force/Territorial Army
- Type: Infantry; Motorized infantry
- Role: Territorial Army
- Size: Battalion; 3 Battalions (World War I); 2 Battalions (World War II)
- Part of: London Regiment; King's Royal Rifle Corps
- Garrison/HQ: Gray's Inn (1860–1908); Beckton Gas Works (two companies); Chenies Street drill hall (1908–1960)
- Motto: Excel
- Colours: None (Rifle regiment)
- Engagements: Second Boer War; First World War: Second Battle of Ypres; Battle of the Somme; Third Battle of Ypres; Battle of Cambrai; Battle of Épehy; Second World War: Battle of Greece; Battle of Crete; Western Desert Campaign

Commanders
- Notable commanders: Howard Vincent

The Rangers was a volunteer unit of the British Army, originally formed in 1860. It provided a detachment for service in the Second Boer War, saw intensive action on the Western Front in the First World War (including the Battles of the Somme and Passchendaele), and served as motorised infantry during the Second World War during the campaigns in Greece and the Western Desert.

== Early history ==
The enthusiasm for the Volunteer movement following an invasion scare in 1859 saw the creation of many Rifle Volunteer Corps composed of part-time soldiers eager to supplement the Regular British Army in time of need. One such unit was the Central London Rifle Rangers formed in 1859 at Gray's Inn, London, from members of the legal profession. It officially came into existence on 30 April 1860 and was numbered as the 40th Middlesex Rifle Volunteer Corps. It was included in the 3rd Administrative Battalion of Middlesex RVCs. The unit drilled in the precincts of Gray's Inn and the headquarters (HQ) was established first at Field Court and then at South Square at Gray's Inn.

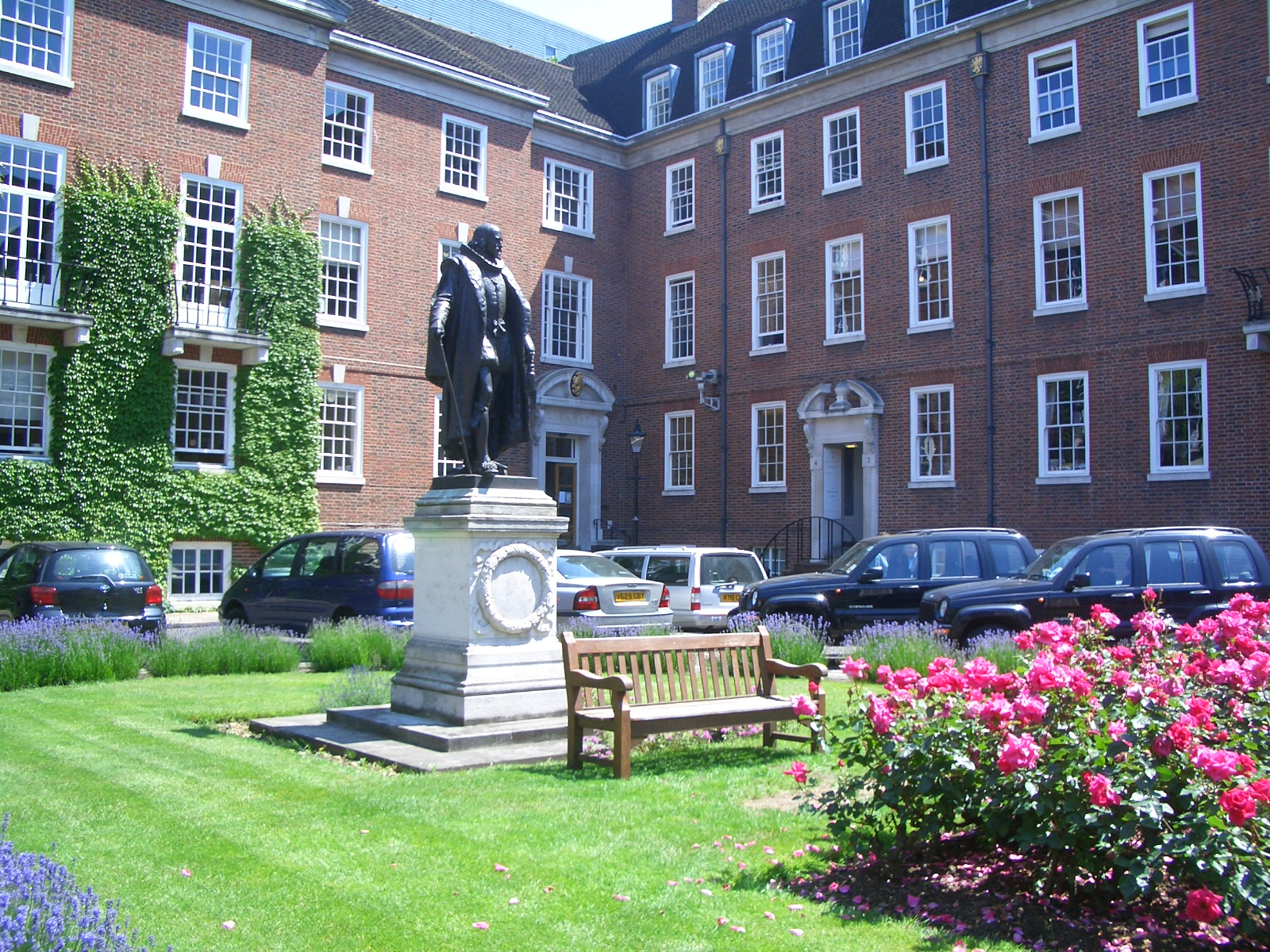
South Square, Gray's Inn.

In 1861, the corps was made independent of the 3rd Administrative Battalion and absorbed the single-company 35th (Enfield) Middlesex RVC whose commanding officer (CO), Alfred Somerset (formerly of the 13th Light Infantry), became lieutenant-colonel of the combined battalion, which was authorised to expand to eight companies in 1862. Its uniform was based on that of the King's Royal Rifle Corps (KRRC).

Sir Alfred Somerset (1829–1915) was the grandson of Henry Somerset, 5th Duke of Beaufort and nephew of Field Marshal Lord Raglan. His second-in-command was Major the Hon Hallyburton Campbell (1829–1918) son of the Lord Chancellor, John Campbell, 1st Baron Campbell, and formerly of the East India Company's service.

The first Honorary Colonel, appointed in 1862, was General Sir James Yorke Scarlett, son of James Scarlett, 1st Baron Abinger, a former Attorney General for England and Wales. General Scarlett was Major Campbell's uncle, and another nephew, Leopold James York Campbell Scarlett (1847–88), was commissioned as a lieutenant in the Rangers in 1863 (he later became Lt-Col in the Scots Guards).

Alfred Somerset left the battalion in 1866 to take command of the 2nd Tower Hamlets Militia, and was succeeded as Lt-Col by Hallyburton Campbell. Campbell's elder brother, William Campbell, 2nd Baron Stratheden and Campbell, became Hon Colonel after Gen Scarlett's death in 1872. Lieutenant-Colonel Campbell (who succeeded as 3rd Lord Stratheden and Campbell in 1893) left the battalion in 1872.

When the Cardwell Reforms introduced 'Localisation of the Forces' in 1873, the 40th Middlesex was brigaded, together with several other London and Middlesex Volunteer and Militia battalions, in Brigade No 49 (Middlesex and Metropolitan) under the Royal Fusiliers. The Volunteer units of these brigades met once a year for a training camp.

== Reform ==
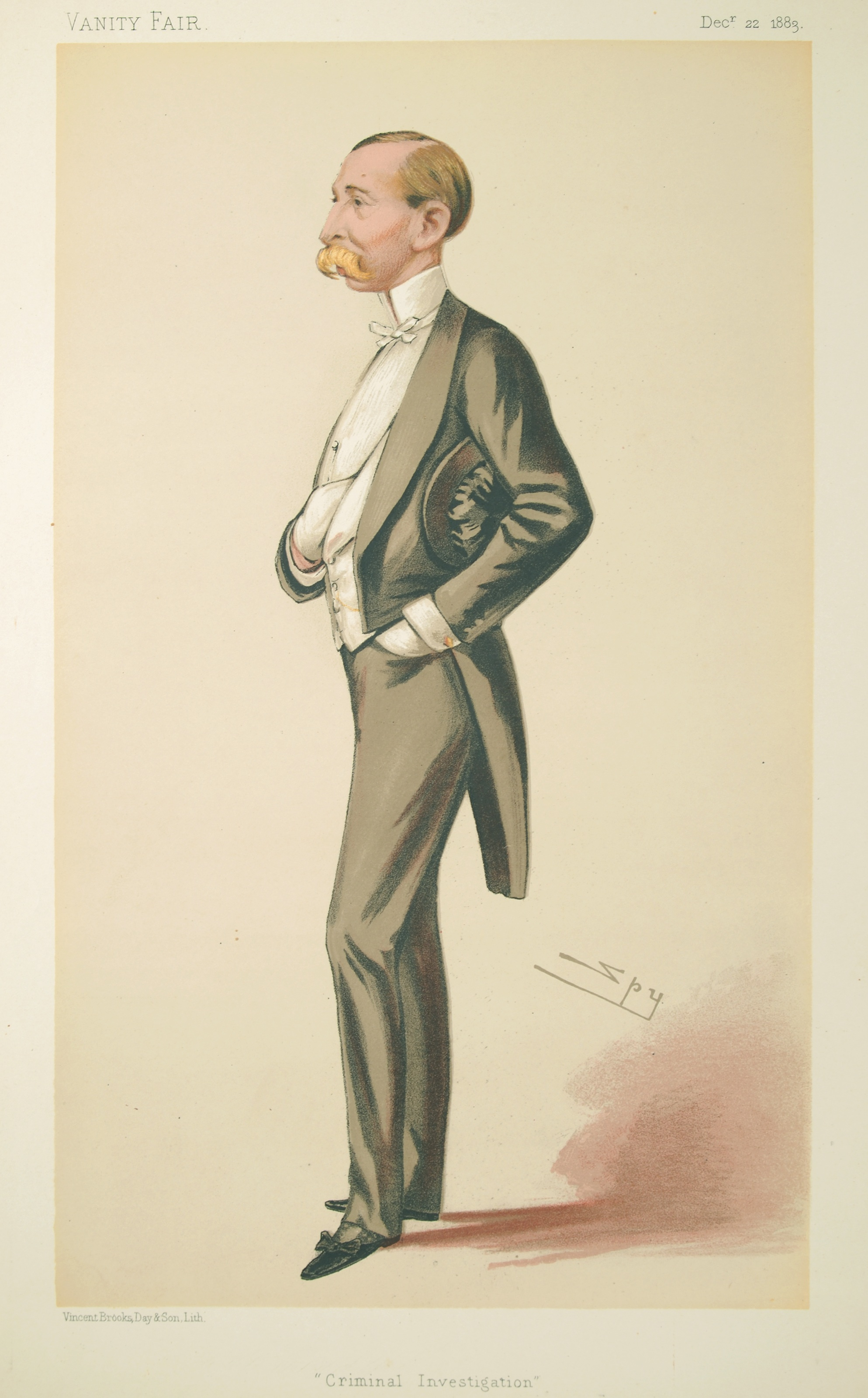
Caricature of Sir Howard Vincent by Spy published in Vanity Fair in 1883.

The battalion was equipped with the Enfield Rifle Musket, later the Snider-Enfield, and used a 600-yard range at Tottenham Park. After Lt-Col Campbell left, the battalion was commanded by a succession of officers, including Lt-Col Adrian Hope, who left to command the London Rifle Brigade, and Lt-Col Henry Hozier, a former staff officer on the British Expedition to Abyssinia and war correspondent of The Times. The unit's numbers began to fall until 1875, when it was reinvigorated under the command of Lt-Col Howard Vincent, later Sir Howard Vincent, first director of the Criminal Investigation Department at Scotland Yard. Vincent instigated a conference of Volunteer COs in January 1878 to discuss reform of the Volunteer Force.

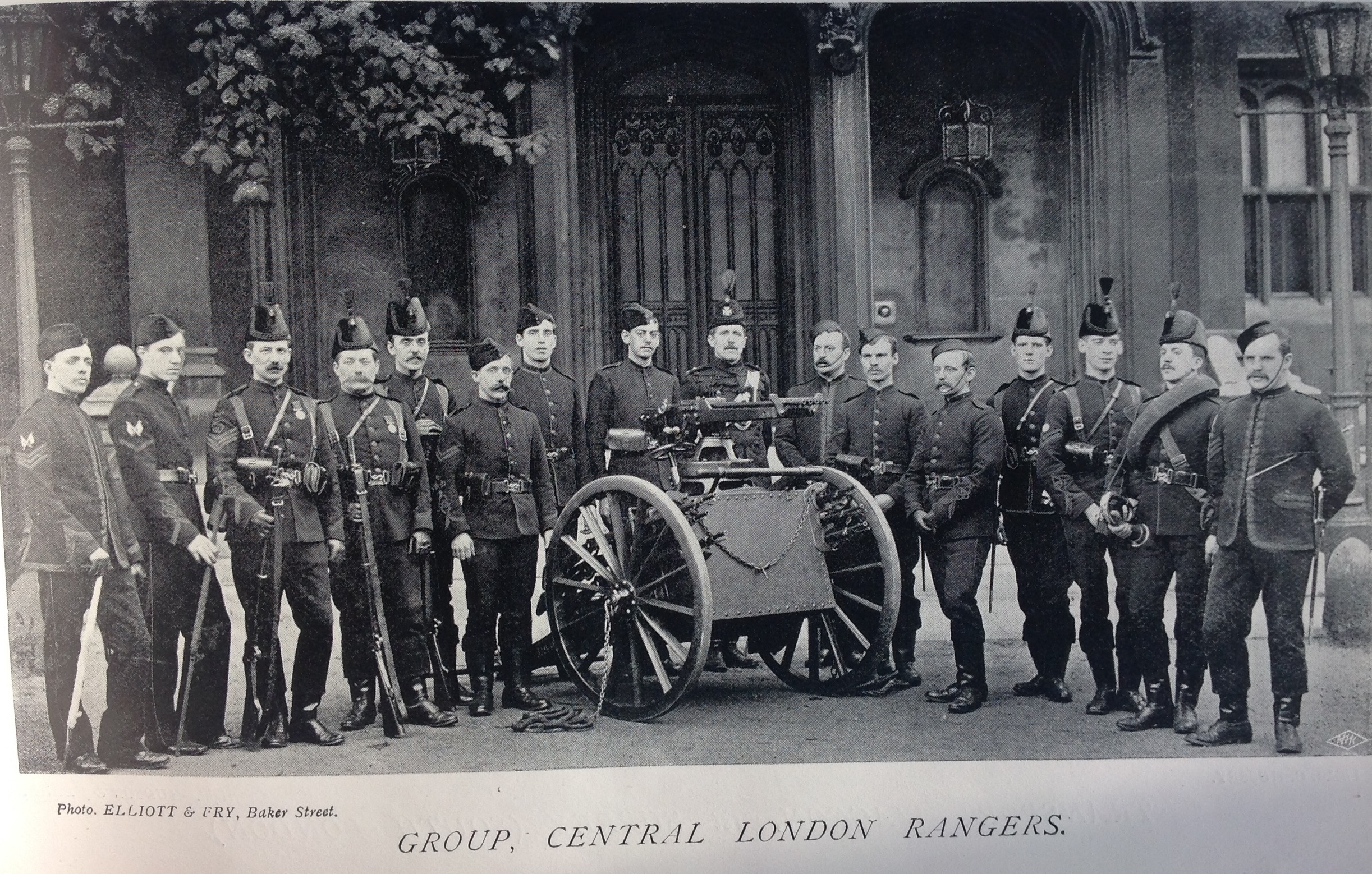
Machine gun section, 22nd Middlesex Rifle Volunteers (Central London Rangers), 1897

In the subsequent reforms, the Rangers were renumbered as the 22nd Middlesex RVC (Central London Rangers) in 1880 and became a Volunteer Battalion of the Royal Fusiliers the following year. This affiliation was changed to the KRRC a year later; officially the Rangers were the 8th VB KRRC, but did not change their title. The Adjutant of the battalion was a Regular officer seconded from the Royal Fusiliers, then from the KRRC. These included Capt (later Col) Sir Thomas Pilkington, 12th Bt, who had served at the Battle of Tell El Kebir, and Maj Lord Robert Manners (killed in action in 1917), son of the Duke of Rutland.

Vincent resigned the command upon his appointment to Scotland Yard, and was succeeded by Lt-Col Sir Henry Malet, late of the Grenadier Guards, and then in 1881 by the battalion's major, William Alt. In June 1882, Lt-Col Alt purchased two five-barrel Nordenfelt machine guns and designed a suitable carriage for them. The Rangers claimed to be the first infantry battalion of the British Army to use machine guns, but were not allowed to use them on parade. Eventually, permission was granted for experimental use in training at Aldershot. Possession of machine guns by Volunteer units was finally authorised by the War Office in October 1883.

During Alt's command, the Rangers recruited two companies from employees of the Gas Light and Coke Company's Beckton Gas Works, and a signal section was established in 1886. Between 1891 and 1899 a Cadet Corps at Mayall College, Herne Hill, was attached to the battalion.

The Stanhope Memorandum of December 1888 introduced a Mobilisation Scheme for Volunteer units, which would assemble in their own brigades at key points in case of war. In peacetime, these brigades provided a structure for collective training. The Rangers were assigned to the North London Brigade.

== Second Boer War ==
After 'Black Week' in December 1899, the War Office accepted the offer of the Lord Mayor of London, Sir Alfred Newton, to raise a force (the City Imperial Volunteers (CIVs)) from among the London Volunteer units for service in the Second Boer War. The Rangers provided a detachment of one officer (Lt Brian Alt, son of Lt-Col Alt) and 26 other ranks, who served in H Company of the CIVs between February and October 1900. Lieutenant Alt was killed at the Battle of Diamond Hill on 12 June, the only officer casualty suffered by the CIVs.

Other members of the battalion served with the Imperial Yeomanry (IY), including Charles Bromfield, who had been commissioned from the ranks of the Rangers as a captain in the 87th Company of the Imperial Yeomanry and died of wounds received in action near Boshof in February 1902.

For providing these contingents, the Rangers were awarded the Battle honour South Africa 1900–02. After the war, the Rangers' battalion HQ moved from South Square at Gray's Inn to 3 Henry Street, Grays Inn.

== Territorial Force ==
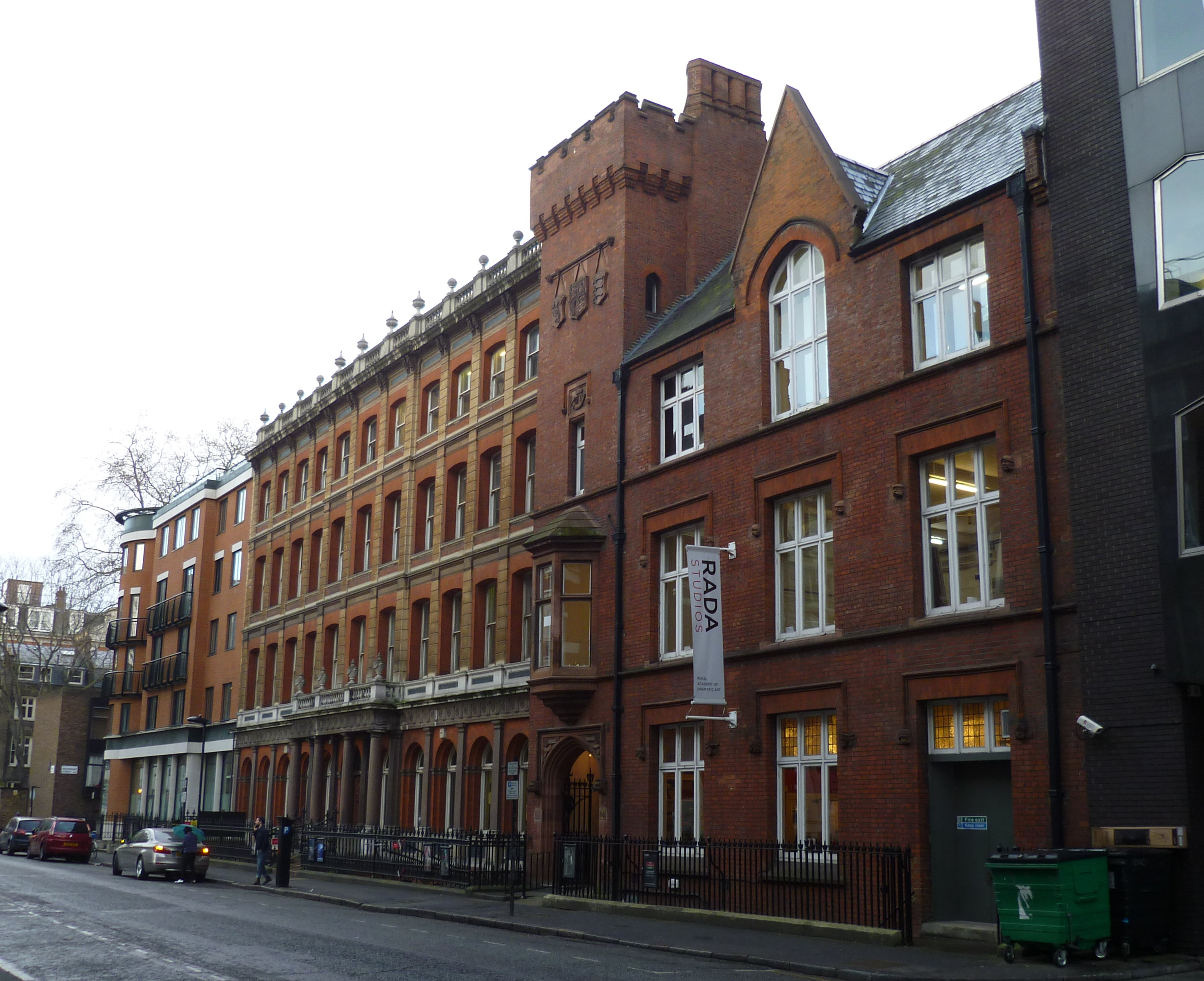
The Drill Hall, Chenies Street (the darker red brick building with the mock-medieval tower), is now the Royal Academy of Dramatic Art Studios.

When the Volunteers were subsumed into the new Territorial Force (TF) under the Haldane Reforms of 1908, the Rangers were transferred from the KRRC to the new all-Territorial London Regiment, as 12th (County of London) Battalion, London Regiment (The Rangers).

On 25 June 1908, the battalion took over the Drill Hall in Chenies Street. Designed by Samuel Knight, this had been built in 1882–3 for the Bloomsbury Rifles (19th Middlesex RVC). In 1908, that corps merged with Queen Victoria's Rifles (1st Middlesex RVC) to form the 9th Bn London Regiment, which continued to use the QVRs' HQ at Davies Street while the Rangers took over the building in Chenies Street.

The North London Brigade, including the 12th Battalion, became the 3rd London Brigade in the 1st London Division of the TF.

== World War I ==
On the outbreak of World War I in August 1914, the Rangers mobilised at Chenies Street as part of 3rd London Brigade. It moved to Bullswater, then to Crowborough in September and Roehampton in December. In the interim, during October 1914, it was assigned to guard the Waterloo-North Camp (Aldershot) railway.

On 25 December 1914, the battalion left its division on landing at Le Havre. On 8 February 1915, it was put under the command of 84th Brigade within 28th Division. On 8 May 1915 the battalion took part in the battle of Frezenburg Ridge, resulting in its almost complete destruction. At the end of the day it mustered only 53 men - all officers being either killed, wounded or captured. The battalion was transferred to GHQ Troops on 20 May to form a composite unit with the London Regiment's 1/5th and 1/13th Battalions. This lasted until 11 August, when the three battalions regained their original identity. On 12 February 1916, it was moved into 168th Brigade within 56th (London) Division.

The battalion switched brigades on 31 January 1918, moving to 175th Brigade within 58th Division–at the same time it absorbed its duplicate 2/12th Battalion, which had been formed in September 1914.

== Interwar years ==
The London Regiment was in abeyance after 1916 and the Rangers became part of the corps of the KRRC once more. The TF was reformed in 1920 and reorganised as the Territorial Army (TA) in 1922 when the battalion was redesignated 12th London Regiment (The Rangers). After the London Regiment was formally disbanded the battalion became The Rangers, KRRC on 10 April 1938. Following the Munich Crisis in late 1938 the TA was doubled in size. On 31 March 1939 the battalion was redesignated as 1st Battalion, The Rangers, KRRC, and on 26 June 1939 a 2nd Battalion was formed.

== World War II ==
=== Mobilisation ===
The TA was mobilised on 1 September 1939 and World War II was declared on 3 September. Both Rangers battalions mobilised in 3rd London Infantry Brigade, which was temporarily in 1st London Division until the new duplicate 2nd London Division was formed in October.

During World War II the 'Greenjackets' (the KRRC and the Rifle Brigade (RB), including their affiliated TA battalions) specialised in providing motorised infantry battalions to armoured brigades and armoured division support groups. These motor battalions were equipped with Universal Carriers ('Bren Carriers') and had more firepower than a standard infantry battalion.

=== 1st Rangers ===
1st Rangers left 3rd Bde on 19 January 1940 and from 1 March it was the motor battalion of 2nd Support Group in 2nd Armoured Division. The group sailed for Egypt on 16 November, arriving on 1 January 1941. On 25 February the battalion transferred to 1st Armoured Brigade Group, which was being sent to Greece as part of 'W' Force to oppose the expected German invasion. 1st Armoured Bde was deployed in front of the main defensive position on the Aliakmon to delay the enemy's advance. The invasion began on 6 April before W Force had completed its deployment. The force was quickly outflanked, forcing it to begin a long retreat through the mountains. 1st Rangers was temporarily attached to 19th Australian Infantry Brigade to cover its withdrawal, but during the confused fighting on 12 April the battalion was unable to hold its positions and only extricated itself with great difficulty. However, the Germans did not follow up, and the rearguard position at Mount Olympus was successfully held throughout 13 April. The Commonwealth forces then withdrew to the Thermopylae position, but 1st Armoured Bde had a nightmare retreat along mountain tracks that had been heavily bombed and were littered with derelict transport, after which the brigade was mechanically unable to carry out its covering role. The Thermopylae position could not be held for long, and the decision to withdraw the Commonwealth forces was made on 21 April. Withdrawal to Attica was carried out over the following week. 1st Armoured Bde finally withdrew from its covering position at Tatoi on the evening of 26 April and headed for Porto Rafti. Many of the personnel (without any heavy equipment) were embarked that night, but a heavy swell delayed the operation and 800 men of the brigade were left behind until they were lifted from Rafina beach aboard HMS Havock the following night.

While embroiled in this campaign 1st Rangers had officially been redesignated 9th Battalion, KRRC (Rangers). (Note: Not to be confused with the 9th (North Cork Militia) Bn, KRRC of 1881–1908, or the 9th (Service) Bn, KRRC, of 1914–18.) on 22 March.

Although most of 1st Armoured Bde had been evacuated back to Egypt, 9th KRRC had only got as far as Crete. With other understrength and composite units acting as infantry, it was attached to the Mobile Naval Base Defence Organisation (MNBDO) at Souda Bay. After a week of 'softening up' air attacks, the German invasion of Crete began on 20 May. Paratroop and glider landings were made at several points along the north of the island, including round Canea, the port of Souda Bay. While there was bitter fighting round Maleme Airfield, the pressure on Canea also increased. By 26 May the position was hopeless, and the troops round Soda Bay were ordered to withdraw southwards through the mountains to Sphakia. Once again the Royal Navy succeeded in embarking thousands of troops from a small beach and evacuating them to Egypt, but many others were taken prisoner.

On its return to Egypt 1st Armoured Bde was employed for the rest of the year in equipping and training other units for operations in the Western Desert, and 9th KRRC was under the British Troops Egypt headquarters. On 4 January 1942 the brigade was assigned to 7th Armoured Division, and on 17 February, 9th KRRC was transferred within the division to 7th Motor Brigade Group, serving alongside 2nd KRRC and 2nd RB.

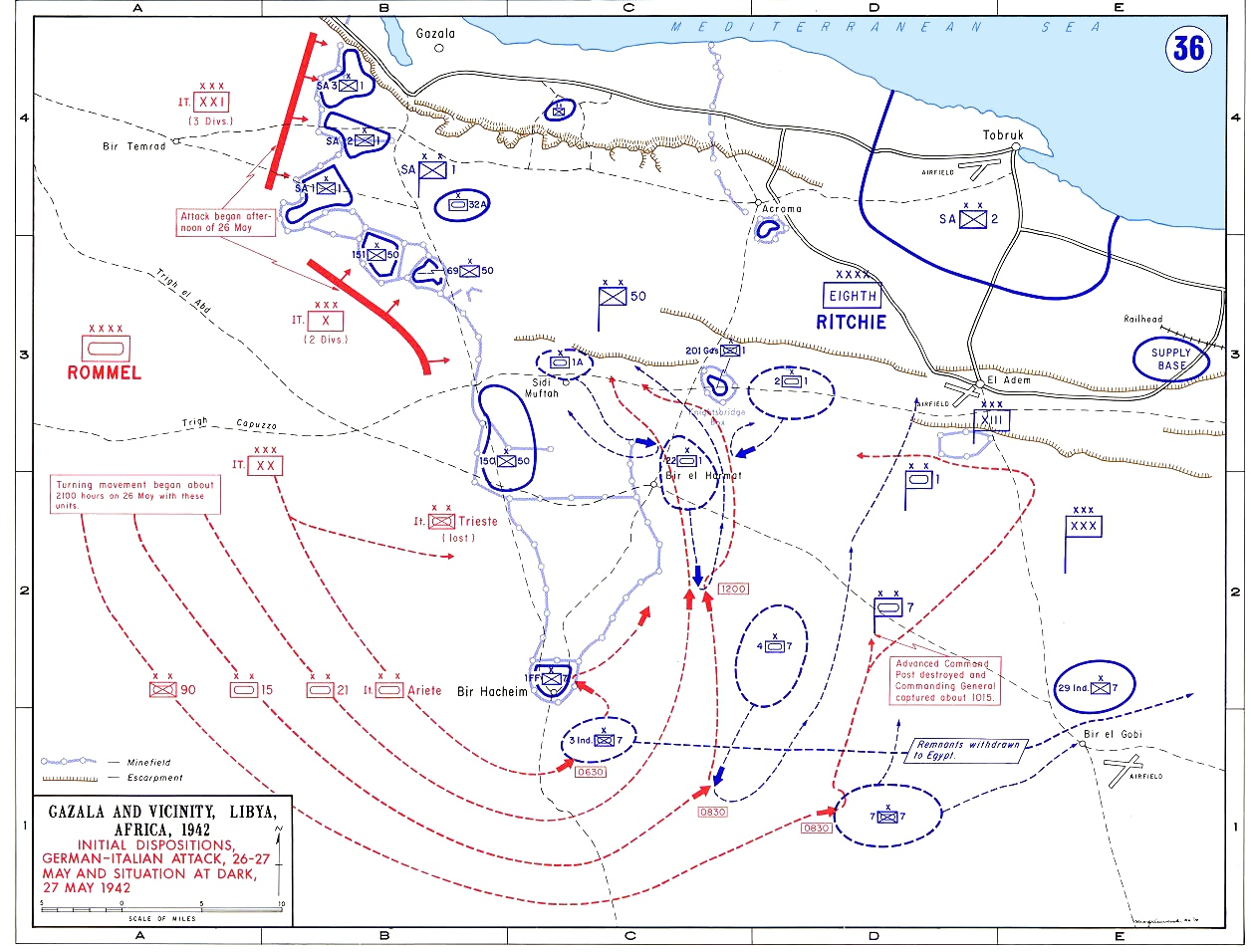
Operation Venezia, and the opening of the Battkle of Gazala.

In late May 1942 the British Eighth Army was defending the Gazala line, with 7th Armoured Division positioned behind the southernmost defences at Bir Hakeim. General Erwin Rommel launched an attack on 26 May (the Battle of Gazala) and that night patrols from 7th Motor Bde detected large columns of enemy vehicles moving towards Bir Hakeim in the moonlight: this was Operation Venezia, Rommels's attempt to outflank the Gazala line. At 08.30 on 27 May the German 90th Light Afrika Division attacked the brigade's defensive position at Retma held by 9th KRRC, 2nd RB and two artillery batteries. The position was partly broken into, but the troops were extricated and withdrew eastwards to Bir el Gubi. However, the 1st Free French Brigade garrisoning Bir Hakeim held out for days, bogging down Operation Venezia, while mobile columns from 7th Motor Bde raided the supply columns of the besiegers. The brigade also ran in columns with supplies, water and ammunition for the defenders through the desert and minefields on four nights between 31 May and 7 June. On 10 June it was decided to withdraw the Bir Hakeim garrison before overwhelming forces were brought against it, and that evening 7th Motor Bde ran a large convoy of lorries and ambulances to a point about 5 miles (8.0 km) west of the position. The garrison broke out to this rendezvous and 2700 troops (including 200 wounded) were brought out successfully. Meanwhile, a vicious armoured battle was raging around Rommel's position in the middle of the British line (the Battle of the Cauldron) and on 13 June 7th Motor Bde was ordered to strike at the enemy's rear between the El Aden and 'Knightsbridge' defensive boxes. But the British armoured formations were nearing exhaustion, and on the night of 13/14 June Eighth Army began to withdraw eastwards from the defensive boxes towards the Egyptian frontier while 7th Armoured Division with all the available armoured and motorised formations operated on the southern flank.

Tobruk fell on 21 June and Eighth Army was pushed back beyond the Egyptian frontier to Mersa Matruh, where it turned and gave battle on 26 June. By now 7th Armoured Division had no armour, but was commanding a group of motorised infantry brigades acting as a covering force. During the battle 7th Motor Bde supported the tanks of 1st Armoured Division: on 27 June 4th Armoured Bde and 7th Motor Bde counter-attacked the 15th Panzer Division, holding up the German advance. However, the pressure was too great and Eighth Army renewed its retreat that night, in two 'bounds' back to the El Alamein position, where a compact defence line could be taken up. Rommel. egan attacking this position on 1 July, but next afternoon a British counter-attack left the armoured brigades supported by a column. from 7th Motor Bde in possession of the battlefield. By 7 July British columns were probing between German formations: a column from 7th Motor Bde evaded observation and reached Fuka in the evening, where it shelled the airfield for half an hour before withdrawing into the darkness. On 21 July Eighth Army attacked at the Second Battle of Ruweisat, with 7th Motor Bde one of several motorised infantry formations operating under 7th Armoured Division.

On 24 July 9th KRRC left 7th Motor Bde. It was not engaged in the Second Battle of El Alamein and afterwards was placed in suspended animation while its personnel were divided as reinforcements between 1st and 2nd Bns KRRC. These battalions fought across North Africa and in Italy with various armoured brigades, ending the war in Austria and North West Europe respectively.

=== 2nd Rangers ===
2nd Rangers left 3rd London Bde on 14 October 1940 and joined 20th Armoured Brigade in 6th Armoured Division. It became 10th Battalion, KRRC (Rangers) (Note: Not to be confused with 19th (Service) Bn, KRRC, of 1914–18.) on 22 March 1941. It remained in the UK throughout the war, absorbing 1st Motor Training Bn, KRRC, in 1941, and ending in 1945 as No 81 Primary Training Wing.

== Postwar ==
In 1947, the battalion became The Rangers, The Rifle Brigade (Prince Consort's Own). In 1960, the Rangers amalgamated with the London Rifle Brigade to form London Rifle Brigade/Rangers.

== Traditions ==
Because of its initial links with Gray's Inn, the regiment claimed descent from the Inns of Court Volunteers of 1780. The Rangers were actually founded to accommodate members of the Inns of Court who did not wish to join the exclusive 23rd (Inns of Court) Middlesex RVC, which had a better claim to descent from The Devil's Own.

The regiment's motto, Excel, was derived from the Roman numerals (XL) of its original numbering as the 40th Middlesex RVC.

== Uniform and insignia ==
On formation, the Rangers adopted the uniform of the Kings Royal Rifle Corps (KRRC), a Rifle green tunic with scarlet facings (except the KRRC's scarlet piping down the front edge of the tunic). A black Shako was worn with a black ball tuft and a silver plated shako plate bearing an eight-pointed star with a bugle, the number XL and the motto Excel, surmounted by a bronzed crown. The waist belt, pouch and bayonet frog were in black leather. Until 1875, dismounted as well as mounted officers wore leather knee boots with the trousers tucked into them. The Pioneers wore a Bearskin of the Guards' pattern.

In 1878–9, a black cloth helmet with bronze fittings was adopted, and by 1885 was in use by all members of the battalion. The helmet and pouch plates were changed to a Maltese cross pattern to resemble the KRRC's. A new Rifle pattern small Busby was adopted in place of the helmet in 1892.

During the 20th Century, the bronze cap badge, like that of the KRRC, was worn on a scarlet backing.

By April 1917 the 1/12th Londons were wearing a curved green cloth shoulder title with the word 'RANGERS' in red at the top of each sleeve. Below this was a square recognition patch in 167th Bde's colour of red, which also appeared on each side of the khaki helmet cover. Officers wore a black Maltese cross on their backs. The 56th Division's formation sign was the short red sword from the coat of arms of the City of London.

The 2/12th Londons wore the same red-on-green shoulder title with a horizontal rectangle beneath in the Rifle green of 175th Bde. 58th Division's formation sign was a white tower for the Tower of London on a hill with a pale blue sky and clouds behind.

== Memorials ==
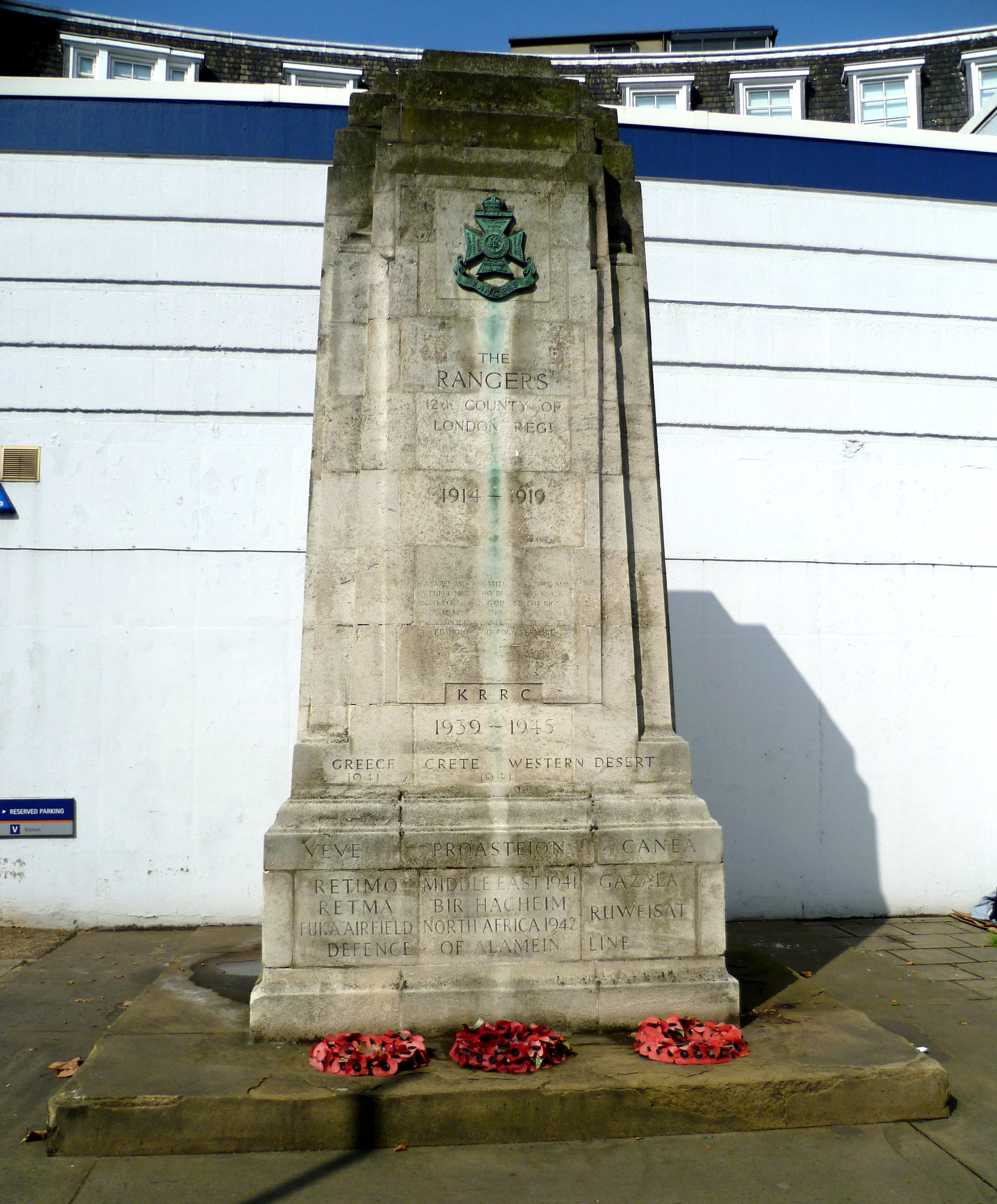
The Rangers' memorial in Chenies Street

The Rangers' First World War memorial was erected in North Crescent, Chenies Street, close to the drill hall. After the Second World War, the battle honours for that war were added to the memorial. The battalion is also named on the listed on the City and County of London Troops Memorial in front of the Royal Exchange, with architectural design by Sir Aston Webb and sculpture by Alfred Drury. The right-hand (southern) bronze figure flanking this memorial depicts an infantryman representative of the various London infantry units. Each unit listed on the memorial was given a bronze plaque; that for the 12th Londons (Rangers) is held at the Army Reserve Centre in West Ham.

== Battle Honours ==
The Rangers were awarded the following Battle honours; those listed in Bold were chosen to be carried on the regimental insignia, because Rifle regiments do not carry Colours:

- **South Africa 1900–02**
- First World War: **Ypres 1915 '17**, Gravenstafel, **St Julien, Frezenberg, Somme 1916 '18, Albert 1916 '18, Ginchy,** Flers-Courcellette, Morval, Le Transloy, Arras 1917, **Scarpe 1917**, Langemarck 1918, Menin Road, Polygon Wood, Passchendales, **Cambrai 1917**, Villers Brettonneux, **Amiens**, Bapaume 1918, Hindenburg Line, **Épehy,** Pursuit to Mons, France and Flanders 1915–18
- Second World War: Gazala, **Retma, Bir Hacheim,** Defence of Alamein Line, Ruweisat, **Fuka Airfield, North Africa 1942, Veve, Proasteion, Greece 1941, Crete, Canea,** **Middle East 1941**

== Honorary Colonels ==
- General the Hon Sir James Yorke Scarlett, appointed 1862.
- William Campbell, 2nd Baron Stratheden and Campbell, appointed 1872.
- Major C.W. Cradock, Royal Fusiliers, former adjutant of the battalion, appointed 1901.
- Col Willam Alt, CB, former CO of the battalion, appointed 1907.
- Sir Corbet Woodall, Governor of the Gas Light and Coke Company, appointed 1909.
- Lieutenant-General Sir Louis Bols, KCB, KCMG, DSO, appointed 1919
- Sir David Milne-Watson, 1st Bt, Managing Director of the Gas Light and Coke Company, appointed 1924
- Field Marshal Harold Alexander, 1st Earl Alexander of Tunis, KG, GCB, GCMG, GCVO, CSI, DSO, MC, appointed 1949
- Colonel Sir W. James Waterlow, 2nd Bt, MBE, TD, appointed 1952

== See also ==
- Connaught Rangers
