= Edmonton Stadium, London =

Former greyhound racing stadium in London, England

Edmonton Stadium
- Interactive map of Edmonton Stadium
- Location: Edmonton, London, London Borough of Enfield
- Coordinates: 51°37′21″N 0°03′03″W

Construction
- Opened: 1930s
- Closed: 1947

Edmonton Stadium was a greyhound racing stadium in Edmonton, London, in the London Borough of Enfield.

== Stadium ==
The stadium was located on the north side of the Tottenham Park Cemetery and Salmons Brook and on the south side of Eastbournia Avenue and St Malo Avenue. The stadium raced as an independent (unaffiliated to a governing body).

It should not be confused with a nearby training track between Tramway Avenue and Tudor Road that served as a straight possibly known as Edmonton Green straight. This training track was also known as Houndsfield after the part of Edmonton it was in and is now a street of housing called Elizabeth Ride.

== Closure ==
Edmonton stadium closed in 1947 and became derelict before being replaced by housing on present day Barrowfield Close.
