= Highgate Vampire =

Supposed supernatural activity at in London in the 1970s

The Highgate Vampire was a media sensation surrounding reports of supposed supernatural activity at Highgate Cemetery in London, England, United Kingdom, in the 1970s. The most thorough account of the story is given by folklorist Bill Ellis in the journal Folklore, published in 1993.

== Initial publicity ==
On 31 October 1968, a group of young people interested in the occult visited Tottenham Park Cemetery, at a time when it was being regularly vandalised by intruders. According to a report in the London Evening News of 2 November 1968:

These persons arranged flowers taken from graves in circular patterns with arrows of blooms pointing to a new grave, which was uncovered. A coffin was opened and the body inside "disturbed". But their most macabre act was driving an iron stake in form a cross through the lid and into the breast of the corpse.

Though the identities and motivations of those responsible were never ascertained, general consensus at the time linked the desecration to events surrounding the Highgate Vampire case.

Then, in a letter to the Hampstead and Highgate Express on 6 February 1970, David Farrant wrote that when passing Highgate Cemetery on 24 December 1969 he had glimpsed "a grey figure", which he considered to be supernatural, and asked if others had seen anything similar. On the 13th, several people replied, describing a variety of ghosts said to haunt the cemetery or the adjoining Swain's Lane. These ghosts were described as a tall man in a hat, a spectral cyclist, a woman in white, a face glaring through the bars of a gate, a figure wading into a pond, a pale gliding form, bells ringing, and voices calling.

Sean Manchester claimed Farrant's "grey figure" was a vampire and the media quickly latched on, embellishing the tale with stories of the vampire being a king of the vampires, or of practising black magic.

== March 1970 mob ==
The ensuing publicity was enhanced by a growing rivalry between Farrant and Manchester, each claiming that he could and would expel or destroy the spectre. Manchester declared he would hold an exorcism on Friday 13 of March 1970. ITV conducted interviews with Manchester, Farrant, and others who claimed to have seen supernatural figures in the cemetery, which were transmitted early on the evening of the 13th; within two hours a mob of 'hunters' from all over London and beyond swarmed over gates and walls into the locked cemetery, despite police efforts to control them.

Some months later, on 1 August 1970, the charred and headless remains of a woman's body were found not far from the catacomb. The police suspected that it had been used in black magic. Farrant was found by police in the churchyard beside the cemetery one night in August, carrying a crucifix and a wooden stake. He was arrested, but when the case came to court it was dismissed.

A few days later Manchester returned to Highgate Cemetery. He claims that this time he and his companions forced open the doors of a family vault (indicated by his psychic helper). He says he lifted the lid off one coffin, believing it to have been mysteriously transferred there from the previous catacomb. He was about to drive a stake through the body it contained when a companion persuaded him to desist. Reluctantly, he shut the coffin, leaving garlic and incense in the vault.

== Aftermath ==
There was more publicity about Farrant and Manchester when rumours spread that they would meet in a "magicians' duel" on Parliament Hill on Friday 13 April 1973, which never occurred. Farrant was jailed for four years and eight months in July 1974 for damaging memorials and interfering with dead remains in Highgate Cemetery—vandalism and desecration which he insisted had been caused by Satanists, not him—as well as other offences.

Farrant and Manchester wrote and spoke repeatedly about the Highgate Vampire, each stressing his own role to the exclusion of the other. Each attempted to control the narrative around the vampire, resulting in ongoing animosity and rivalry between the two. Their feud continued for decades, marked by insults and vindictiveness, until Farrant's death in April 2019.

== In popular culture ==
- According to author Bill Ellis, the Hammer Horror film Dracula AD 1972, starring Christopher Lee and Peter Cushing, was inspired by the Highgate Vampire.
- The Highgate Vampire appears as a villain in the Dark Horse comics series Buffy the Vampire Slayer Season Nine. The Highgate Vampire is revealed to be, not a vampire, but an insectoid demon that feeds off its victims' emotional trauma. Rupert Giles had nearly been killed by the creature in 1972. The Highgate Vampire became a minion of Drusilla when it returned in the 2010s.
- Il vampiro di Highgate (Highgate Vampire) is the title of 45th issue of Italian horror comic book series Dampyr.
- The Highgate Vampire was covered on episode 388 of The Last Podcast On The Left.
- The 2021 song "Graveyard Sun" by Green Lung is based on the mythical Highgate Vampire.
- When planning a witching hour visit to a grave in Highgate West, the threat of the vampire is discussed in Amelia Ellis' 2018 novel The Mirror of Muraro.
- In 2025, Bag of Beard Theatre Company reimagined the events in a fictionalised play, titled 'The Highgate Vampire', at The Glitch Theatre, London. The production transferred to the Omnibus Theatre and subsequently The Cockpit, North London. {https://theatreweekly.com/the-highgate-vampire-announced-as-inaugural-stephen-joseph-transfer-at-the-cockpit/)
