= Henry Spalding (architect) =

Henry Spalding (4 Sept 1838 – 25 Jun 1910) was a British architect.

Spalding was an assistant for William Gilbee Habershon and Edward Habershon from 1857 to 1863. He was in partnership with Samuel Knight (architect) and then went on to establish his own practice with Edward Haberson and later went into partnership with Patrick Auld, Alfred William Stephens Cross and his son Reginald Henry Spalding.

His buildings include Dulwich Public Baths, Camberwell Public Baths and Belle Vue House, Sudbury, Suffolk

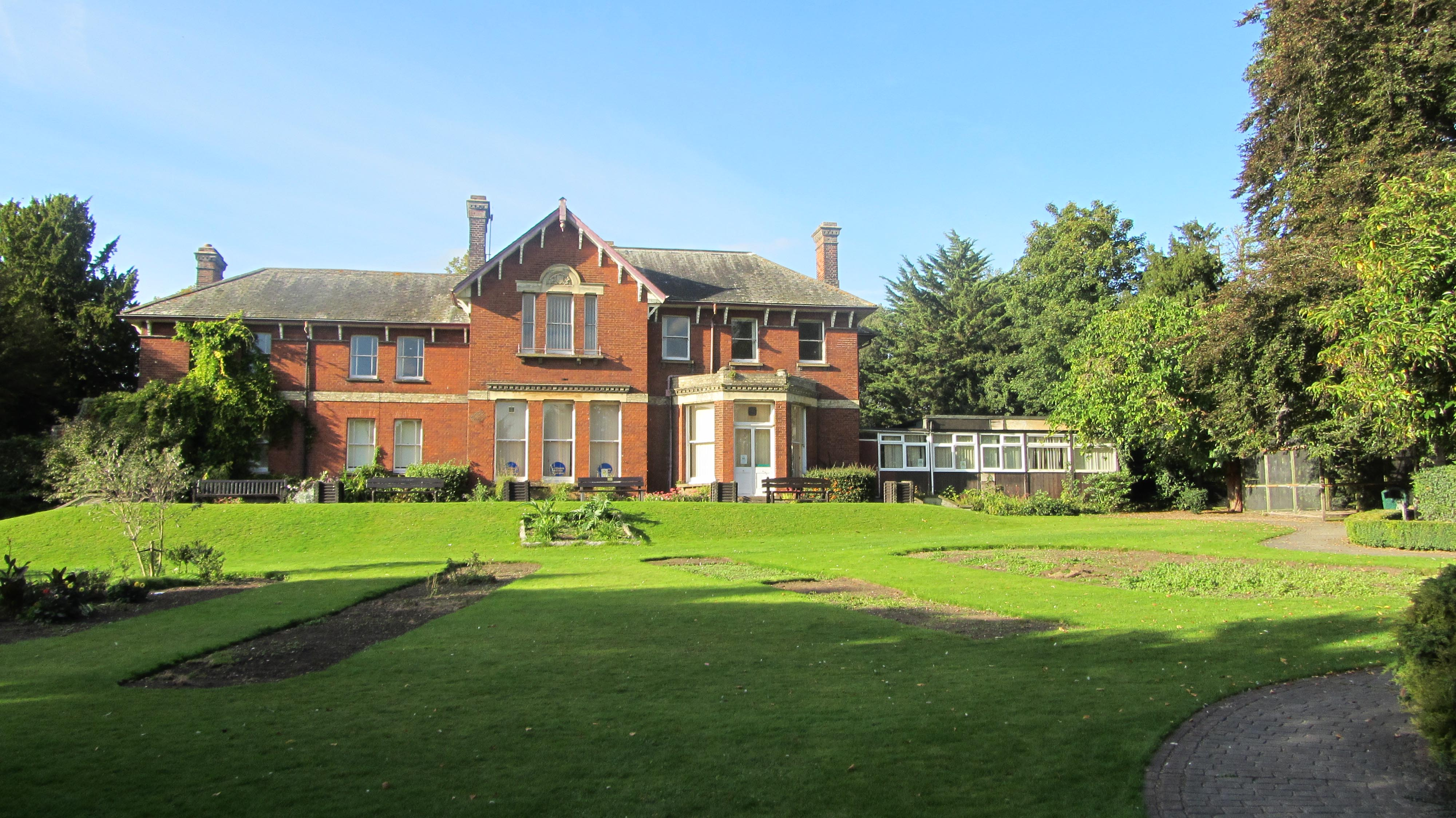
Belle Vue House, Sudbury, Suffolk designed by Spalding & Knight
