= Samuel Knight (architect) =

British architect

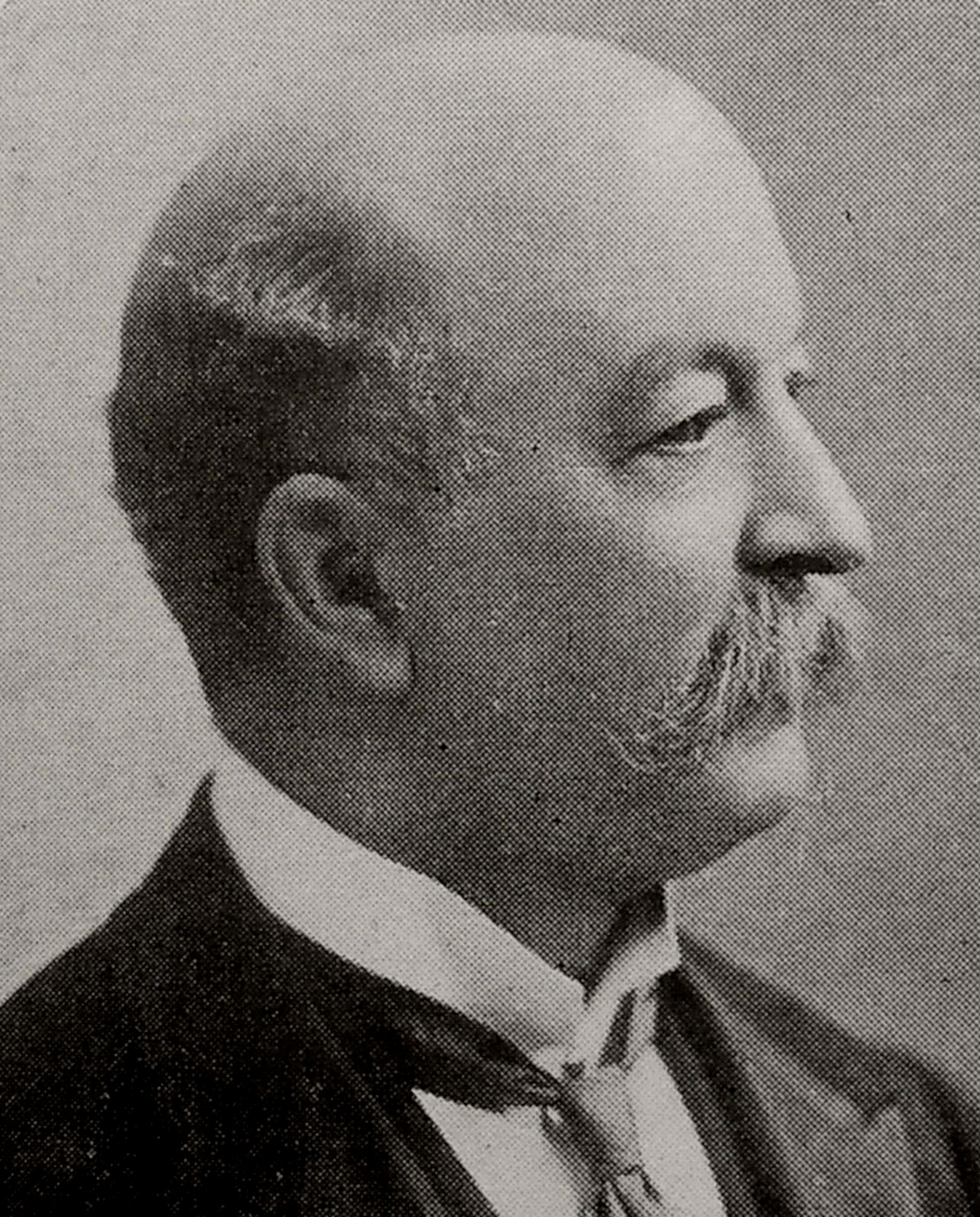
Samuel Knight (1834-1911)

Samuel Knight (1834–1911) was a British architect practising from Cornhill Chambers, 62 Cornhill, London EC and later 175 and 176 Temple Chambers, Tudor Street, London EC.

== Early life ==
Knight was born in Exeter on 3 September 1834 to Samuel Knight and Mary Boalch Anning., living in his early life at Summerland Street, St Sidwell, Exeter. He was educated at Exeter Cathedral School. His father was a master statuary (sculptor) with work on a number of Devon churches. His paternal grandfather (Lewis) was also a stonemason. Samuel's sister, Mary Charlotte Knight, was the mother of the artist Robert Anning Bell (1863-1933), who was articled to Knight for three years.

== Career ==
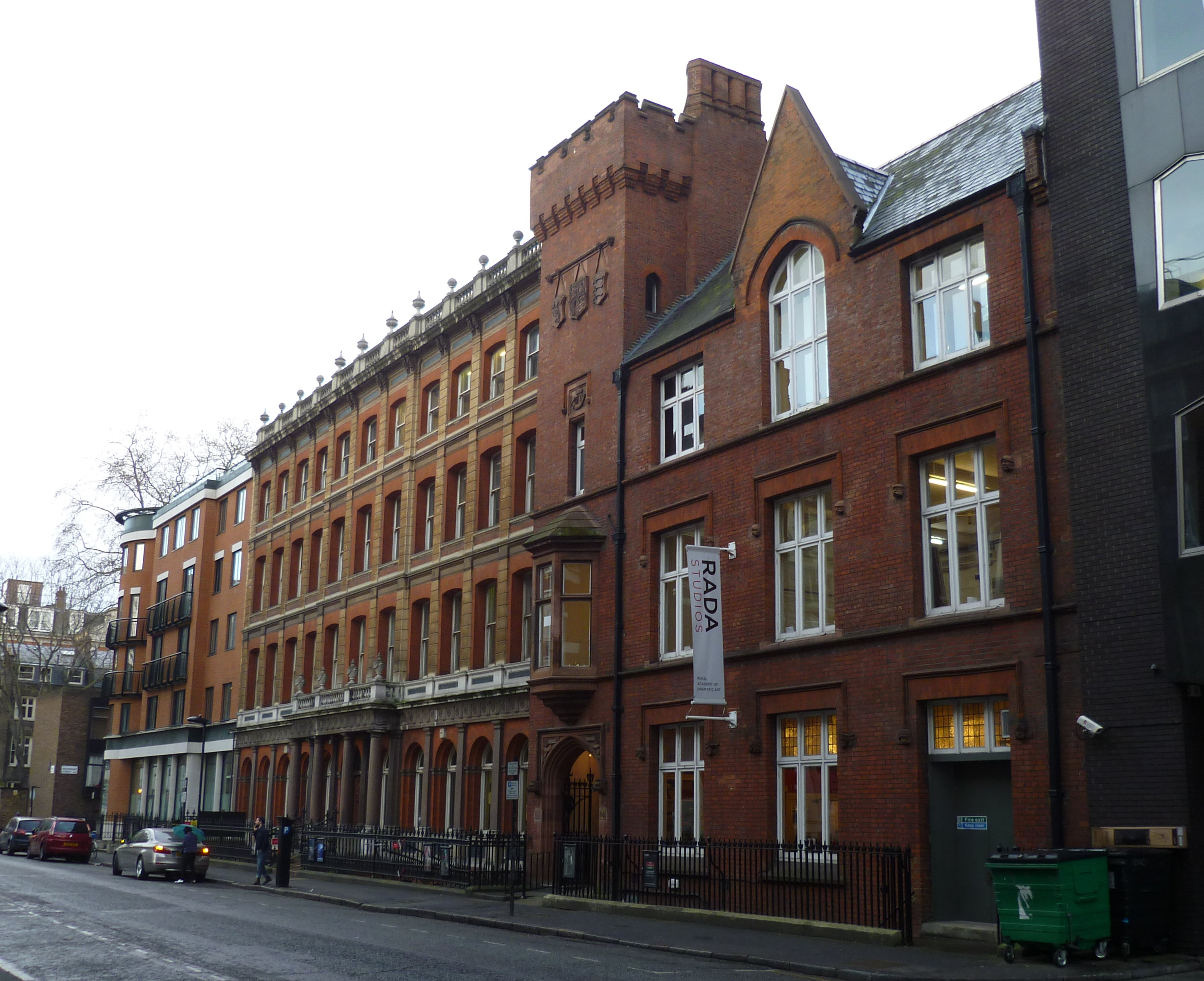
The Drill Hall in Chenies Street (right), now RADA Studios.

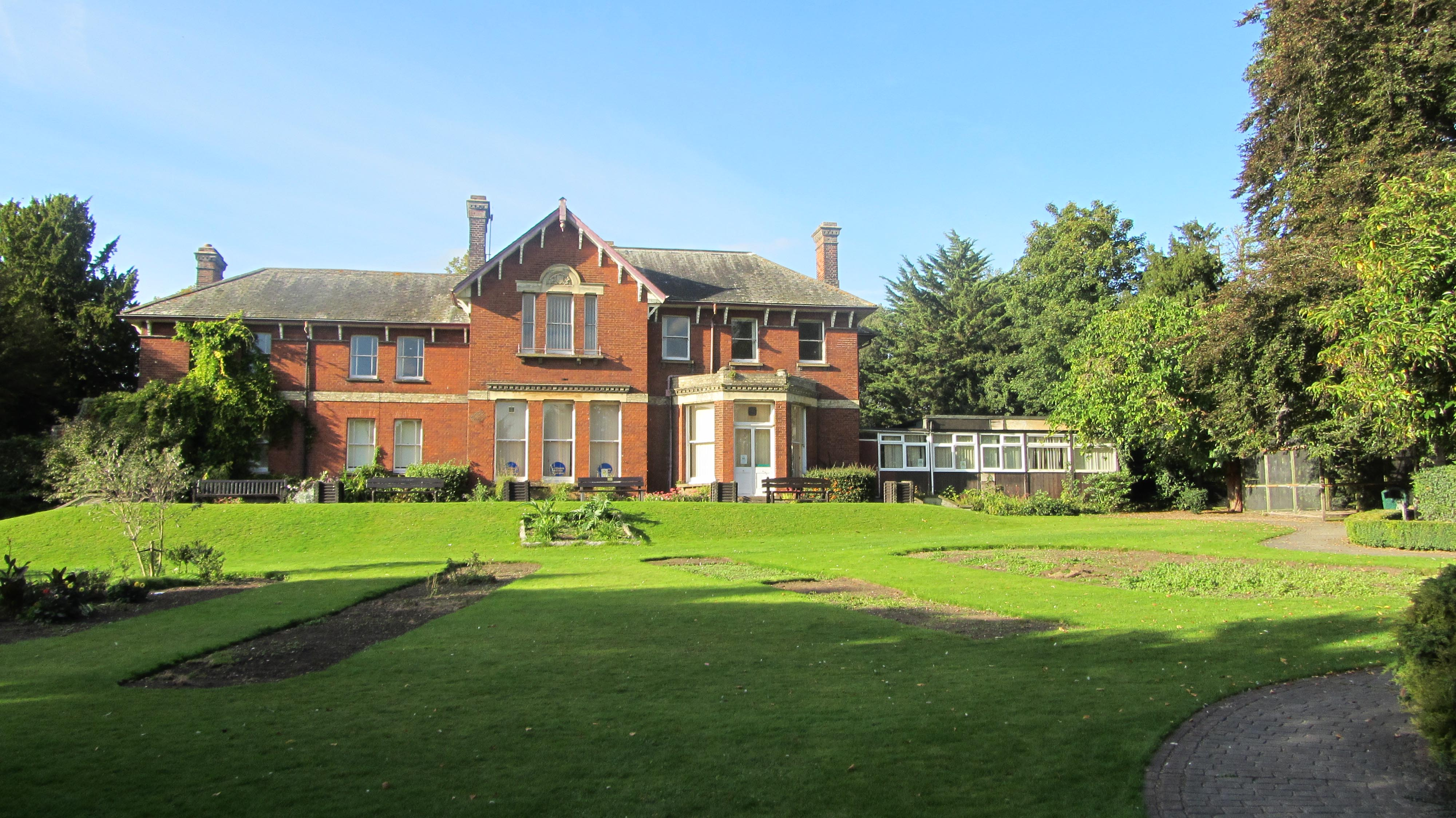
Belle Vue House, Sudbury, Suffolk designed by Spalding & Knight

Knight was articled to William Gilbee Habershon and Edward Habershon (d. 1901) in 1854 and remained for 16 years as Chief Assistant. He became an Associate of the Royal Institute of British Architects on 17 March 1873 (proposed by T H Wyatt, E Habershon and T Roger Smith) and a Fellow of RIBA on 10 Feb 1879 (proposed by T H Wyatt, W Emerson and T Roger Smith). He was in partnership with Henry Spalding (1832-1910) from around 1871 and in independent practice from 1878.

In 1879, Knight won a competition (from amongst 18 entries) to design Devonport Public Hall in Fore Street. Costing some £10,000 and opened in 1881, it provided space for concerts and other public gatherings with the occasional use as a theatre. The hall was converted into the Electric Cinema in 1909 with seating for 700, and then further enlarged in 1931 to seat 2,300. The cinema was destroyed by German bombs on 24 April 1941.

In 1882-83, Knight designed The Drill Hall, in Chenies Street, London, for the Bloomsbury Rifles, a volunteer unit in which Knight was at the time a captain (and later an Honorary Major). The building is now known as RADA Studios and is a grade II listed building with English Heritage. He also designed a number of private dwelling houses and other buildings in North Finchley, including the family home during the 1890s, Netherelms on Woodside Avenue. With Henry Spalding RIBA he also designed a prestigious villa for a solicitor's family (with connections to the Andrews family of Gainsborough's Mr & Mrs Andrews) called Belle Vue House in Sudbury, Suffolk.

Woodside Hall and Assembly Rooms, adjoining Woodside Park station, erected in 1885, at the sole cost of Henry Holden esq. proprietor of the Woodside Park Estate, form a structure of brick with stone dressings, in the Elizabethan style, from designs by Mr. Samuel Knight, architect, of London, and include a hall 70 by 30 feet, available for public meetings, concerts and dramatic performances, with a suite of retiring rooms...

— Kelly's Directory of Middlesex, 1895

Woodside Hall became Woodside Park Synagogue in 1950.

Knight directed the £1600 rebuilding of St Andrew's Church, Hempstead, Essex, in 1887-8; excluding the chancel, Harvey chapel and tower.

He designed a number of country houses, some for friends, and laid out several suburban estates.

He wrote "The influence of business requirements upon street architecture" describing the changes in city buildings that have taken place during the nineteenth century.

== Other activities ==
Knight was a regular correspondent with The Times and other newspapers in the 1890s and had a number of letters published relating to his profession, the activities of the railway companies, and local issues such as the landscape around Richmond Hill.

He was active in a number of other fields including being a liveryman in the Worshipful Company of Shipwrights, Honorary Architect for the Association of Conservative Clubs, Honorary Major in Bloomsbury Rifles, and he kept his Devon roots with membership of the committee of Devonians in London and attendance at their gatherings. His personal papers show a keen interest in astronomy (for example, in the return of Halley's Comet in 1910).

== Family ==
Following the premature death of his first wife Hannah Oliver (née Tutton) in 1867, Knight married Helen Wilden in 1868, with whom he had 9 children, 7 of whom survived infancy, the other two dying of tuberculosis. 1891 census records show they had six daughters and one son at that time. Helen died in 1892. His home address between 1891 and 1901 was 7 Downe Terrace, Richmond Hill. He married his former housekeeper, Amelia Salt, in 1906 and moved to Higham Park. His residential address at the time of his death was 32 Selwyn Avenue, Higham Park.

== Bankruptcy ==
In February 1904, a Receiving Order was made against Knight under the Bankruptcy Acts 1883 and 1890.

== Death ==
Knight died on 8 May 1911 in West Ham Union Infirmary, Leytonstone, leaving some £2360 with probate granted to his son, Arthur Wilden Knight.
