= Alfred Cross =

British architect (1858–1932)

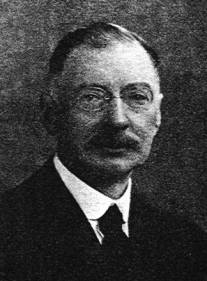
Alfred William Stephens Cross

Alfred William Stephens Cross (1858–1932) was a British architect.

From 1889 to 1899 he was in partnership with Henry Spalding as Spalding and Cross, taking part in many competitions for building design. Cross and his son (Kenneth Mervyn Baskerville Cross, 1890–1968) became specialised in designs for public baths.

== Designs ==
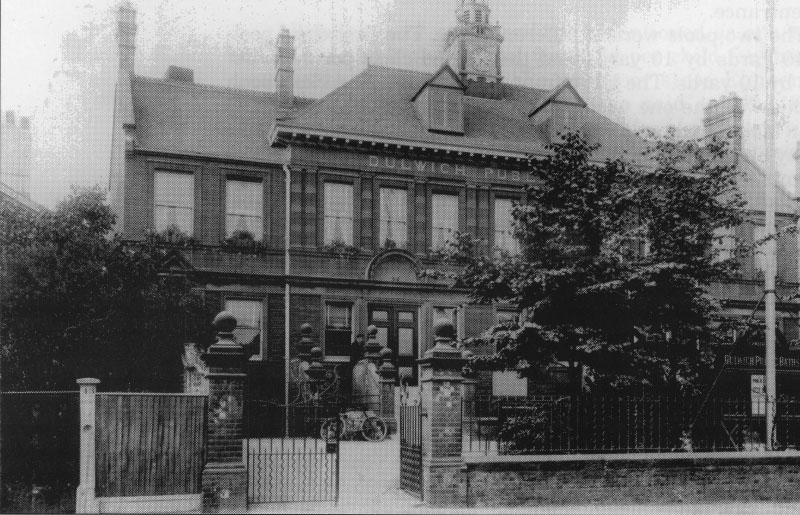
Photo taken in 1896 of Dulwich Public Baths (now Dulwich Leisure Centre).

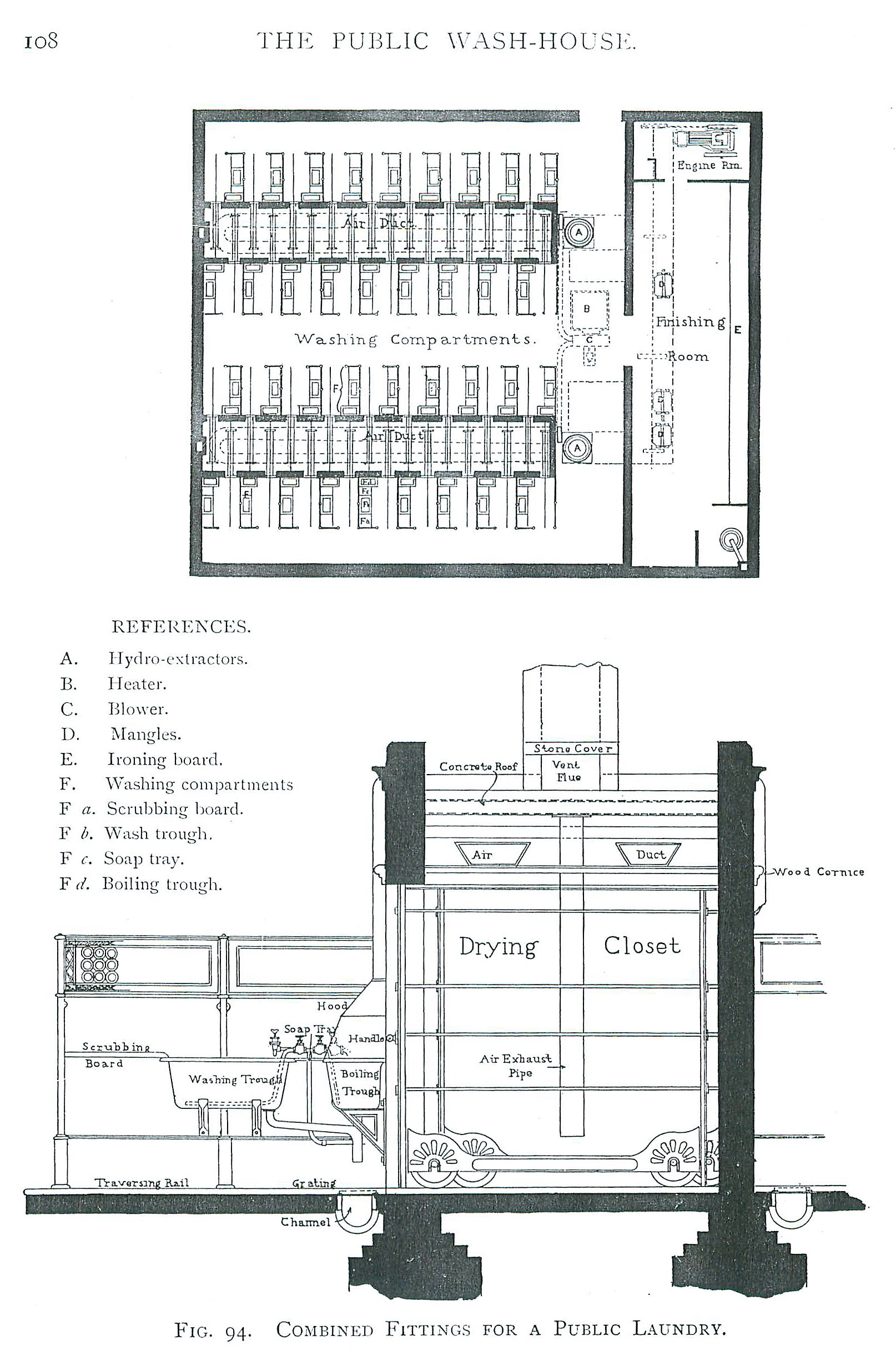
Illustration from Public Baths and Wash Houses (1906) showing the ideal laundry layout in a public wash house.

Public Baths

- Dulwich Baths 1890 (open 1891)
- Hampstead Baths 1891
- Camberwell Baths 1892
- Coventry Baths 1890s-1966 (Note: Coventry Baths were damaged during the blitz of 1940 and demolished in 1966. The only remaining evidence of the building can be found in the car park opposite the current Coventry Central Baths on Fairfax Street (opened in 1966), which has a small brick block which housed the filtration tanks (Gordon & Inglis 2009, p. 240).)
- Haggerston Baths, Hackney 1904
- Marshall Street Baths (or Westminster Baths) 1931
- Public Baths Finsbury 1931
- Public Baths Clyde Street Deptford
- Hoxton Baths
- Seymour Place Baths Marylebone
- Walthamstow Baths
- Wandsworth Baths
- Additions to St John's College Cambridge (Note: Additions included 8 slipper baths, 16 Lassar Baths (showers) with changing cubicles and a boiler house.)

Other works

- Almshouses at Wood Green
- Remodelling of Stanton Drew Church 1881
- Restoration of Market Cross, Cheddar
- The Vicarage Easton-in-Gordano 1885
- Glendale Clevedon 1887
- Two hospitals in the West of England
- Finalist in the London County Hall Competition 1908
- Headquarters 17th Rifle Volunteers Camden Town 1890
- Mission Premises Kentish Town 1891
- Congregational Church and School Hall Finchley Road 1891
- Church West Hampstead
- Church Harlesden
- Artisans’ Dwellings Manchester
- Schools at Cricklewood, Hendon, New Barnet and West Hampstead
- Municipal College of Technology, Manchester
- Gosport Free Library 1900
- Portsmouth Technical Institute 1900
- Municipal Dye House Manchester 1903 ( part of the Municipal Technical School )
- Merchant Venturers’ Technical College Bristol
- Edward Davies Memorial Chemistry Laboratories, Aberystwyth University 1905
- Restoration of Shoreditch Town Hall 1906
- Schools at Finchley, Poplar, Gospel Oak and Kentish Town
- Public Library Deptford

== Publications ==
- Cross, Alfred W S, History of architecture, I.C.S. reference library, London, International Correspondence Schools, OCLC 7067813
- Cross, Alfred William Stephens (1906), Public baths and wash-houses: a treatise on their planning, design, arrangement, and fitting, having special regard to the acts arranging for their provision, with chapters on Turkish, Russian, and other special baths, public laundries, engineering, heating, water supply, etc, Batsford
- Cross, Alfred W S (1910), The crowning quality of architecture, Cooper, Wettern & Co., OCLC 80997438
- Cross, Alfred W S; Cross, Kenneth M B (1930), Modern public baths and wash-houses : [illust.], London, OCLC 220978759

== See also ==
- Oskar Lassar

== Sources ==
- Gordon, Ian; Inglis, Simon (2009), Great Lengths: The historic indoor swimming pools of Britain, English Heritage, ISBN 978-1-905624-52-2
