= Bloomsbury Rifles =

St Giles's and St George's Bloomsbury Volunteers 37th (St Giles's and St George's Bloomsbury) Middlesex RVC 19th (St Giles's and St George's Bloomsbury) Middlesex RVC
- Active: 1803–1814; 1860–1908
- Country: United Kingdom
- Branch: Volunteer Force
- Type: Infantry
- Size: Battalion
- Part of: Rifle Brigade; North London Brigade
- Garrison/HQ: Foundling Hospital (1860–1882); Chenies Street drill hall (1882–1908)
- Colors: None (Rifle regiment)
- Engagements: Second Boer War

The Bloomsbury Rifles, officially the St Giles's and St George's Bloomsbury Rifle Volunteer Corps, was a Volunteer unit of the British Army in London from 1803 to 1814 and from 1860 until 1908.

== Early history ==
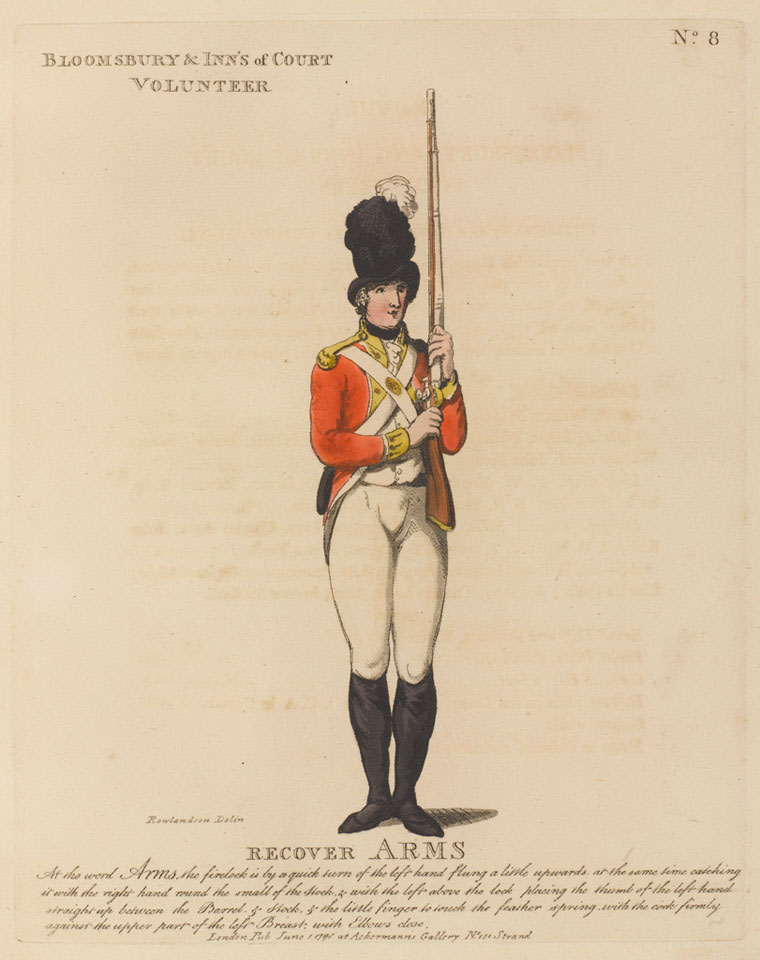
1798 engraving of a Bloomsbury and Inns of Court Volunteers private

The Bloomsbury and Inns of Court Volunteers was a British Volunteer Corps unit raised in June 1797 during the French Revolutionary Wars. It was formed by the residents of the London district of Bloomsbury and the lawyers of the Inns of Court. Its uniform was depicted by Thomas Rowlandson as a red jacket with yellow facings, white breeches and black gaiters, with white cross-belts and a 'round hat' (similar to a Top hat) surmounted by a comb-like black plume.

This unit was disbanded at the Peace of Amiens in 1802, and when it was resuscitated on the renewal of war in 1803, a separate St Giles's and St George's Bloomsbury Volunteers (known as the GGB) was raised in the parishes of St Giles-in-the-Fields and St George's, Bloomsbury. This unit continued until the return of peace in 1814.

== Rifle Volunteers ==
The enthusiasm for the Volunteer movement following an invasion scare in 1859 saw the creation of many Rifle Volunteer Corps (RVCs) composed of part-time soldiers eager to supplement the Regular British Army in time of need. The formation of a new RVC for the parishes of St Giles and St George was agreed at a public meeting held at the Store Street Music Hall on 22 December 1859. The proposal was supported by Sir Samuel Morton Peto, the civil engineer and MP for Finsbury, and by Nevil Story Maskelyne of the British Museum (who later became one of the officers).

The St Giles's and St George's Bloomsbury Rifles was officially formed on 31 March 1860 at the District Board of Works office in Holborn and was numbered as the 37th Middlesex RVC. Unlike in 1797, the lawyers formed their own corps in 1860: the 23rd (Inns of Court) Middlesex RVC at Lincoln's Inn and the 40th (Central London Rifle Rangers) Middlesex RVC at Gray's Inn. After formation, the corps was organised as;

- Corps Headquarters at Local Board of Works, Holborn
- No.1 Company
- No.2 Company
- No.3 Company
- No.4 Company

The new Bloomsbury Rifles consisted of one company, which joined the 4th Administrative Battalion of Middlesex RVCs. It maintained its independence despite suggestions that it should merge with the 28th (St Pancras) Middlesex RVC, and the existence of another corps in Bloomsbury, the 19th, formed at the Working Men's College by Thomas Hughes. The Bloomsbury Rifles had four companies within a year, was made independent of the 4th Admin Bn in 1861, and its strength had risen to eight companies by 1866. The unit adopted a uniform of Rifle green with green facings. The title of St Giles's and St George's Bloomsbury was officially added to its number in 1869, when the 19th (Working Men's College, Bloomsbury) Middlesex RVC was obliged to drop the 'Bloomsbury' from its title.

== Training ==
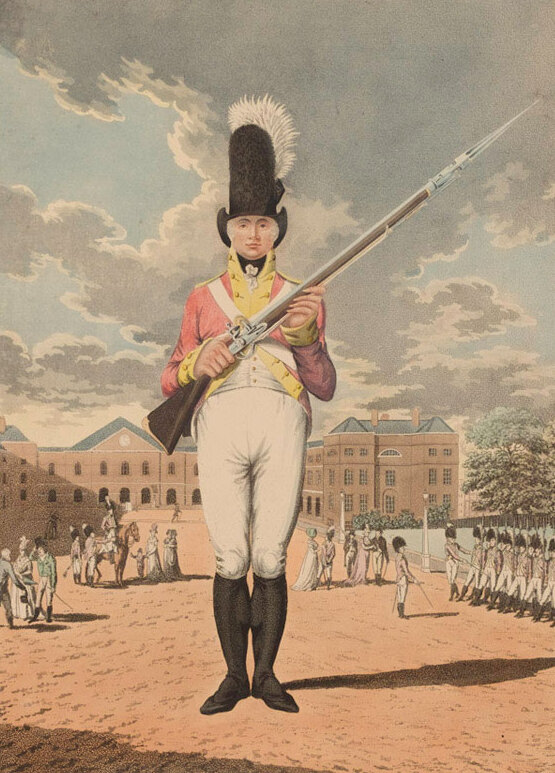
1803 engraving of the Bloomsbury and Inns of Court Volunteers drilling at the Foundling Hospital

From the beginning the Foundling Hospital in Guilford Street gave permission for the Bloomsbury Rifles to use its grounds (Coram's Fields) for drill and soon the headquarters was established at the hospital. Old Russian muskets captured in the Crimean War were at first used for drill. In its early days the corps organised a private camp at Wimbledon Common, on the ranges of the National Rifle Association, and in 1871 it inaugurated the tradition of marching to the annual Volunteer Review at Brighton.

When the Cardwell Reforms introduced 'Localisation of the Forces' in 1873, the 37th Middlesex was brigaded, together with several other London and Middlesex Volunteer and Militia battalions, in Brigade No 53 & 54 under the Regular Rifle Brigade. The Volunteer units of these brigades met once a year for a training camp.

== Drill Hall ==
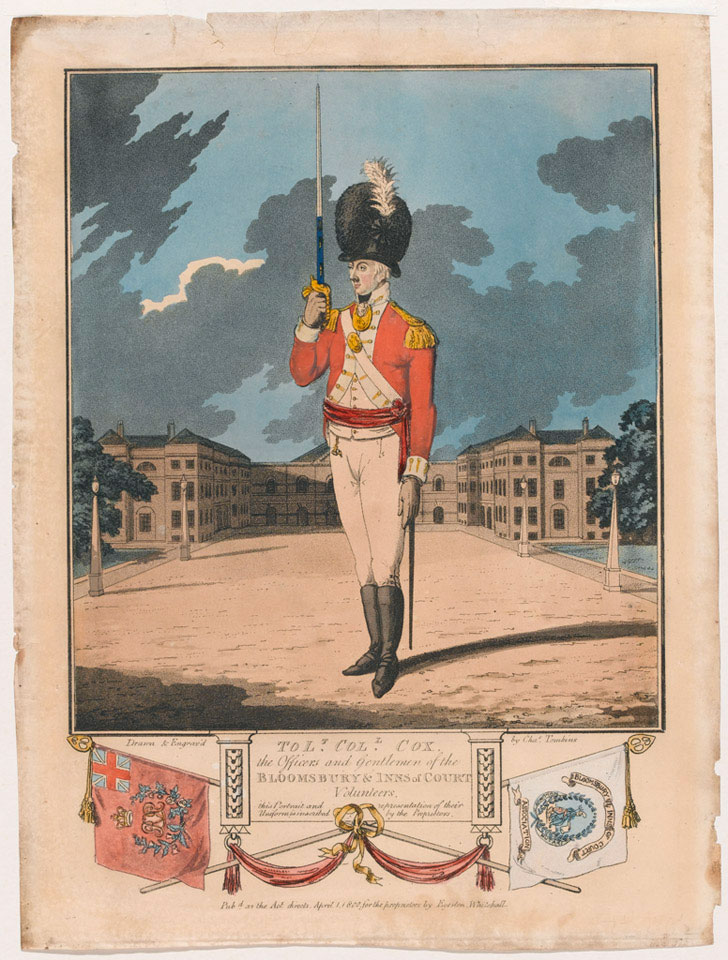
1800 engraving of a Bloomsbury and Inns of Court Volunteers officer

The last former member of the St Giles and St George's (GGB) Volunteers of 1803–14 died in 1877, and a High Court ruling allowed the newer unit to take over its remaining funds (£2000). This sum was put towards building a dedicated drill hall and battalion HQ. Designed by the architect Samuel Knight, an officer in the corps, and costing £11,000, The Drill Hall in Chenies Street was built in 1882–3.

== Reorganisation ==
The Volunteer Force was reorganised in 1880, when the Bloomsbury Rifles were renumbered as the 19th (St Giles and St George's Bloomsbury) Middlesex RVC (causing some confusion with the former 19th (Working Men's College), now renumbered 10th) and the following year it became the 6th Volunteer Battalion of the Rifle Brigade without changing its title.

The Stanhope Memorandum of December 1888 introduced a Mobilisation Scheme for Volunteer units, which would assemble in their own brigades at key points in case of war. In peacetime these brigades provided a structure for collective training. The Bloomsbury Rifles were assigned to the North London Brigade.

The Bloomsbury Rifles Freemason Lodge No 2362 was formed by members of the battalion on 1 May 1890.

== Second Boer War ==
After 'Black Week' in December 1899, the War Office accepted the offer of the Lord Mayor of London, Sir Alfred Newton, to raise a force (the City Imperial Volunteers (CIVs)) from among the London Volunteer units for service in the Second Boer War. The Bloomsbury Rifles provided a detachment of one officer and 39 other ranks, who served in South Africa between February and October 1900. A further 58 members of the battalion served with the Imperial Yeomanry, two with the King's Royal Rifle Corps, and 29 with the Royal Army Medical Corps. For providing these contingents the Bloomsbury Rifles was awarded the Battle honour South Africa 1900–02.

== Territorial Force ==
When the Volunteers were subsumed into the new Territorial Force under the Haldane Reforms of 1908, the Middlesex RVCs were transferred to the new all-Territorial London Regiment. The 19th (GGB) Middlesex RVC was merged into the 1st (Queen Victoria's Rifles) Middlesex RVC to form the 9th Bn London Regiment (QVR), which continued to use the QVRs' HQ at Davies Street. The 12th Bn London Regiment (The Rangers) (formerly the 22nd Middlesex RVC (Central London Rangers)) took over the Bloomsbury Rifles' Drill Hall in Chenies Street on 25 June 1908, and it remained in use until 1960.

== Commanding officers ==
The following officers commanded the corps during its existence:

- Lt-Col John Jeakes, 1860–63
- Lt-Col Malcolm Corrie, 1863–66
- Lt-Col Robert Stedall, 1866–80
- Lt-Col Samuel Richards, 1880–98
- Lt-Col B.W. Hardcastle, 1898–1904
- Lt-Col A.S. Bargam, 1904–08
