= RADA Studios =

Theatre in Bloomsbury, London

- Chenies Street, London
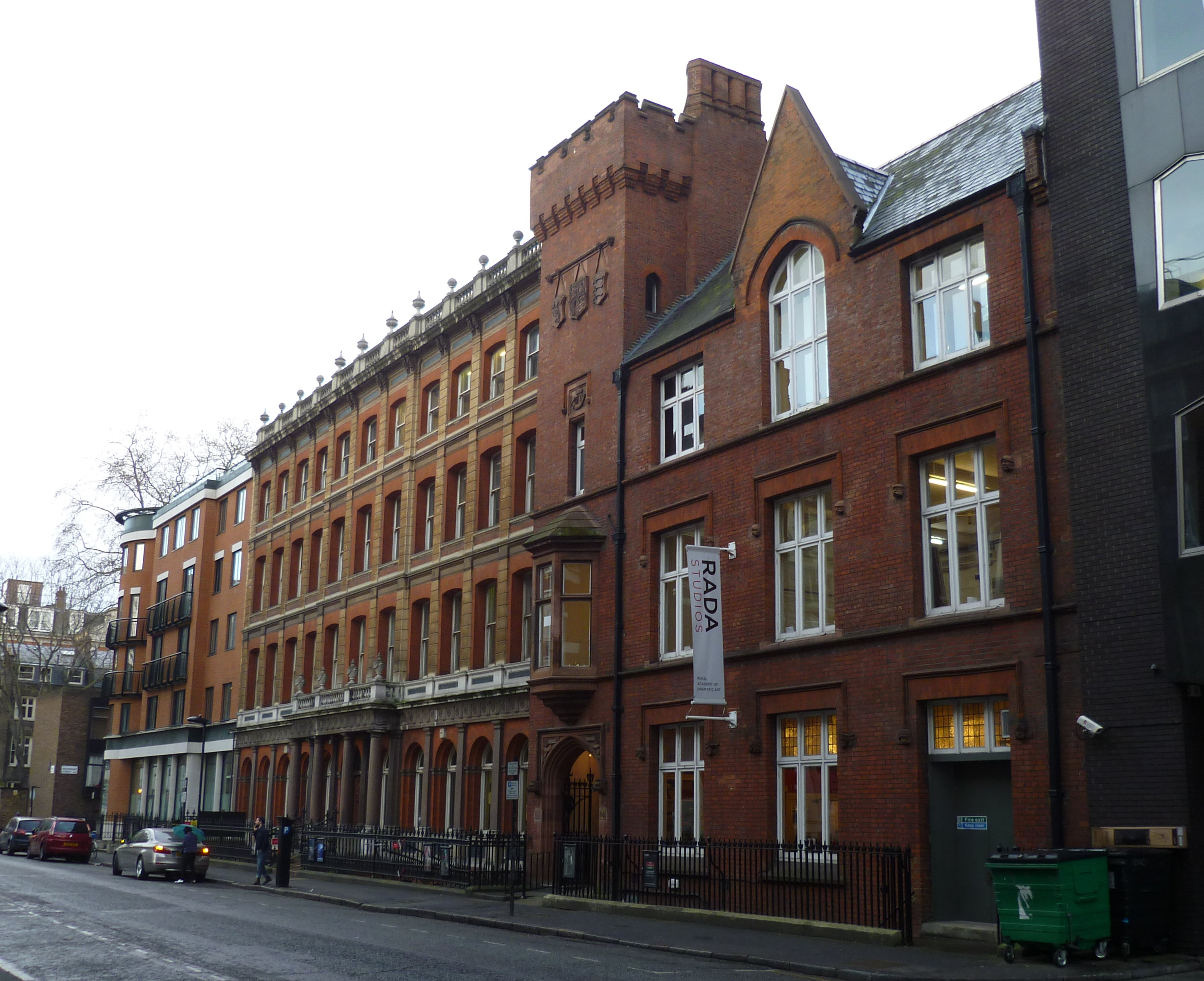
- RADA Studios

Site information
- Type: Drill Hall

Location
- Location within London
- Coordinates: 51.520556°N 0.1325°W

Site history
- Built: 1882; 144 years ago
- Built for: War Office
- Architect: Samuel Knight
- In use: 1882–present

RADA Studios (formerly The Drill Hall) is a theatrical venue in Chenies Street in Bloomsbury, just to the east of Tottenham Court Road in the West End of London. Owned by the Royal Academy of Dramatic Art (RADA), the building contains rehearsal rooms, meeting rooms, and the 200-seat Studio Theatre.

== History ==
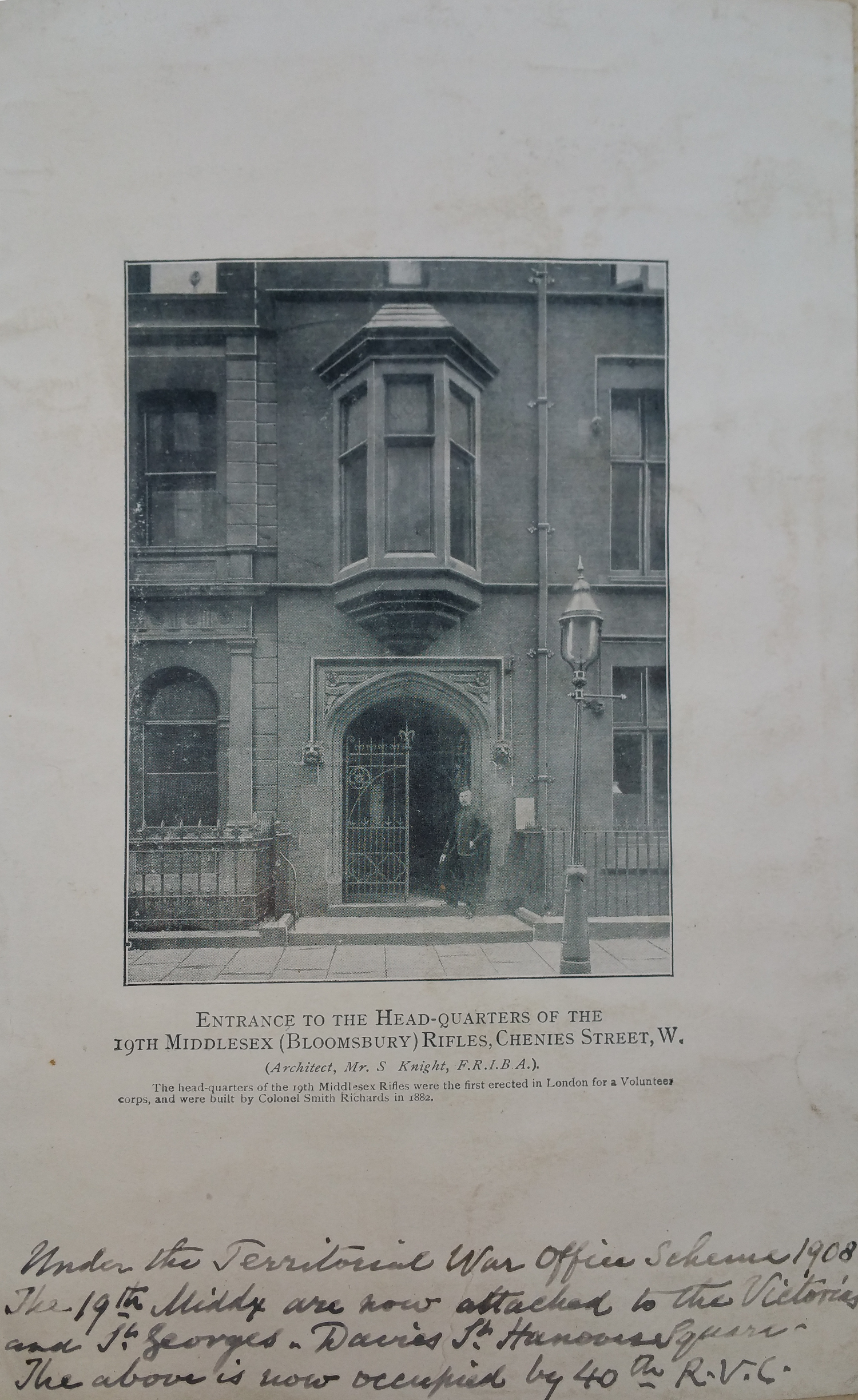
The Drill Hall shortly after completion

The building was designed by Samuel Knight as the headquarters of the St Giles's and St George's Bloomsbury Rifles and completed in 1882. It has a notable artistic history: in the 1900s, Sergei Diaghilev and the Ballets Russes rehearsed there. The Bloomsbury Rifles amalgamated with the 1st Middlesex (Victoria and St George’s) Volunteer Rifle Corps and moved out to the Davies Street drill hall in 1908. In their place the 12th (County of London) Battalion, London Regiment (The Rangers) took over the Drill Hall in Chenies Street on 25 June 1908. The battalion was mobilised at the Drill Hall in August 1914 before being deployed to the Western Front.

When the London Regiment was broken up and the battalions reallocated to other units in August 1937, the hall became the home of The Rangers, The King’s Royal Rifle Corps. During the Second World War the hall was used for Ralph Reader's Gang Shows.

In 1947, following another re-organisation, the unit based at the drill hall was renamed The Rangers, The Rifle Brigade (Prince Consort’s Own). However, in 1960, after the Rangers amalgamated with the London Rifle Brigade the hall fell vacant.

In the 1960s the building was used as an art gallery for the Tate Gallery’s exhibition of the McAlpine Collection. It started to be used as an arts centre for Bloomsbury and Fitzrovia in 1977, and became a theatre, the Drill Hall, in the 1980s after many years of being used as a rehearsal hall. From 1984, the Drill Hall particularly supported production of theatrical and artistic works with gay and lesbian themes. In 2007, the Drill Hall, with an annual turnover of £1.25 million, was supported with £250,000 of Arts Council funding, but late in 2007, the Arts Council announced it was withdrawing this funding to concentrate its funding on other ventures. (Similar fates befell 194 other arts organisations.)

The Drill Hall was home to The Musical Theatre Academy from 2009 to 2011. The triple threat theatre college is now located at Bernie Grant Arts Centre.

In January 2012, RADA acquired the lease of the venue from Central London Arts Ltd, who had run The Drill Hall for 30 years. RADA's objectives in acquiring the lease included the possibility of hiring out the central London rehearsal and studio space as a "further opportunity for income generation and sustaining the charity as it continues into its second century of operation." Central London Arts then began trading as Outhouse London, with the intention of continuing to produce large-scale theatre and community-theatre events across London and the UK.

The entire venue is available for hire from RADA. The 200-seat Studio Theatre has been utilised by the BBC as a studio for recording radio shows, such as Cabin Pressure, in front of a live audience.
