= Camberwell Public Baths =

Leisure centre in the London Borough of Southwark, England

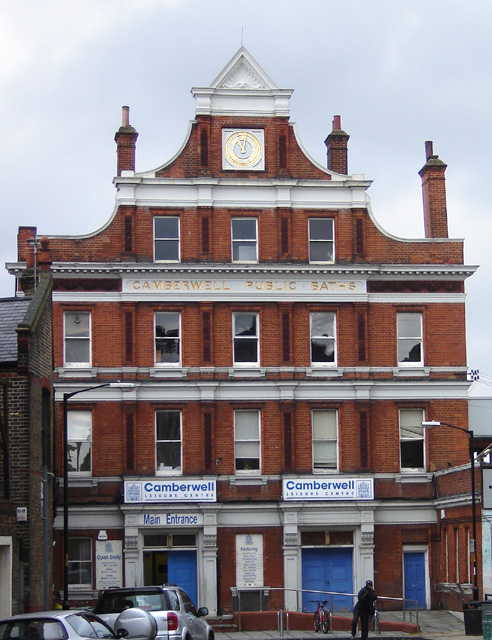
- The Baths in 2005
- Interactive map of Camberwell Public Baths
- Location: Camberwell Leisure Centre, Artichoke Place, off Camberwell Church Street, SE5 8TS
- Coordinates: 51.47435°N 0.09056°W
- Operator: Everyone Active
- Facilities: Exercise studio, swimming pool, gym

Construction
- Opened: 1 October 1892
- Architect: Spalding & Cross

Website
- Official website

Camberwell Public Baths (also Camberwell Baths and recently Camberwell Leisure Centre) opened in 1892 and has been in continuous operation as publicly funded community baths and more recently as a public leisure centre.

== Description ==
Originally the Camberwell Public Baths, the building is now known as the Camberwell Leisure Centre. The facilities include a gym and swimming pool. The baths are managed by Everyone Active in partnership with Southwark Council. As well as swimming sessions, the centre offers swimming classes, badminton, personal training in the gym and caters for children's parties.

One of the original two pools is boarded over and is now used as a sports hall. The remaining pool has been converted into two pools, the main pool which is 25 metres long and a shallow pool which is 10 metres wide and is used mainly for teaching lessons. The pool has male and female changing rooms as well as a dedicated family changing room.

The baths have undergone extensive refurbishment and reopened in early 2011. The Flemish Renaissance style facades are Grade II listed.

Currently the leisure centre is open between 06:30 and 22:00 on weekdays, 07:00 and 18:00 on Saturdays and 07:00 and 22:00 on Sundays. The swimming pool and gym is free to use for residents of Southwark Council all day on Fridays and after 14:00 on weekends as part of their free gym and swim initiative across the borough.

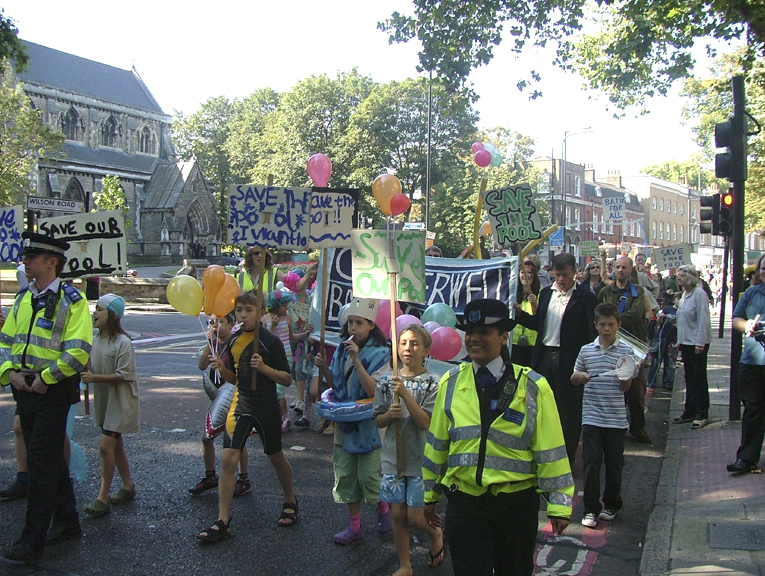
2007 Friends of Camberwell Baths campaign march through Camberwell.

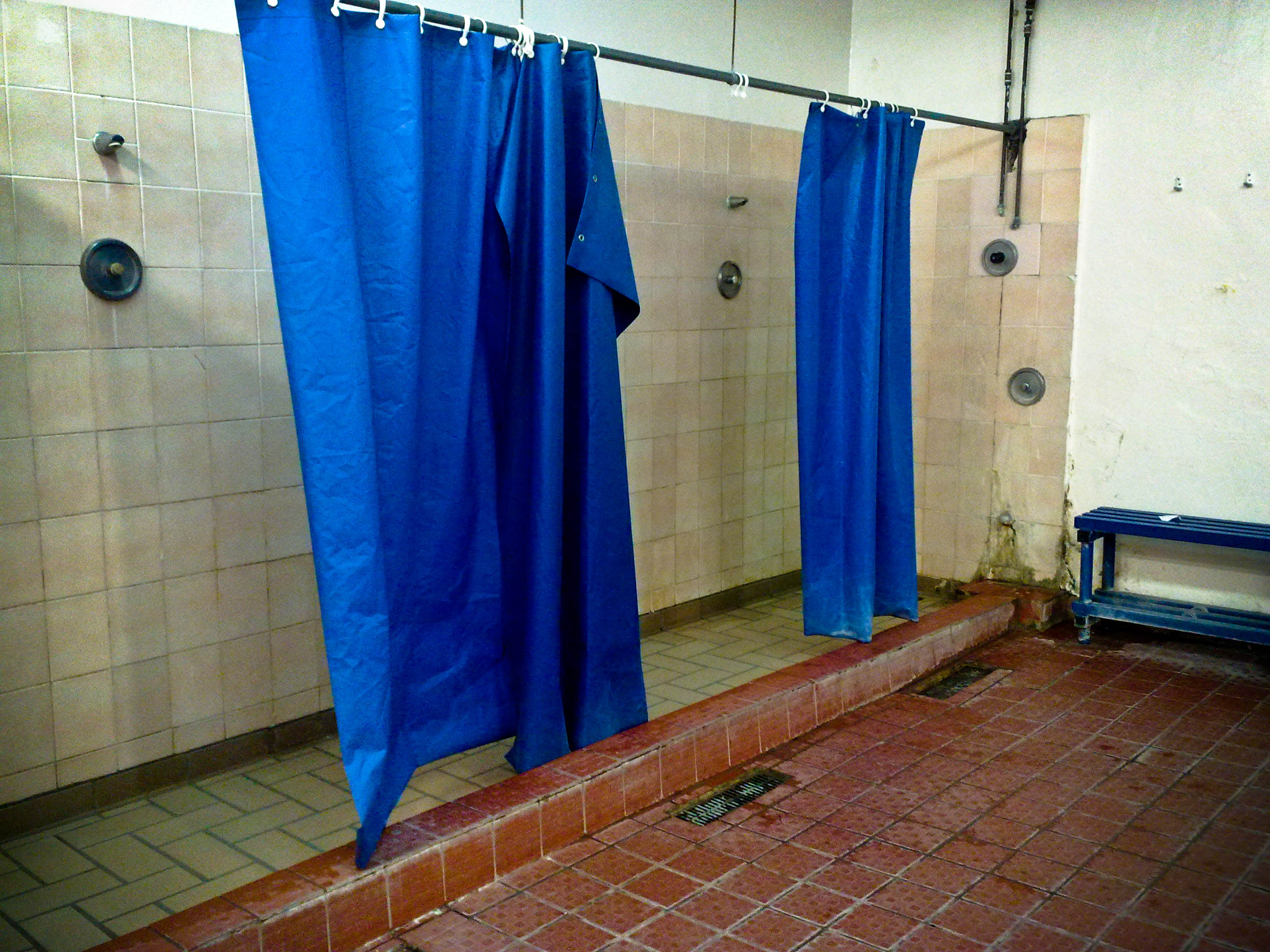
The dilapidated showers before refurbishment in 2009

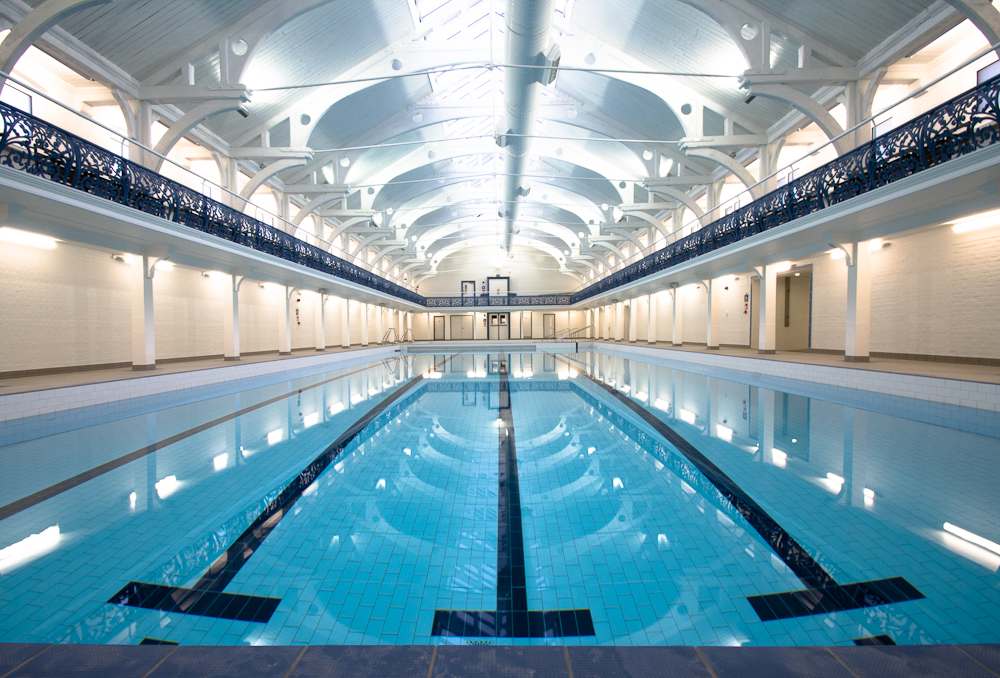
The swimming pool shortly before public re-opening in February 2011

== Campaign ==
Friends of Camberwell Baths was formed in 1998 to defend against closure. From May 2006 until October the Council planned that the Baths would receive £5m to £6m for full refurbishment. In January 2007 the council had decided to "provide up to £1.5 million capital funding to ensure that the Centre stays open with its current facilities."

== Modern renovation ==
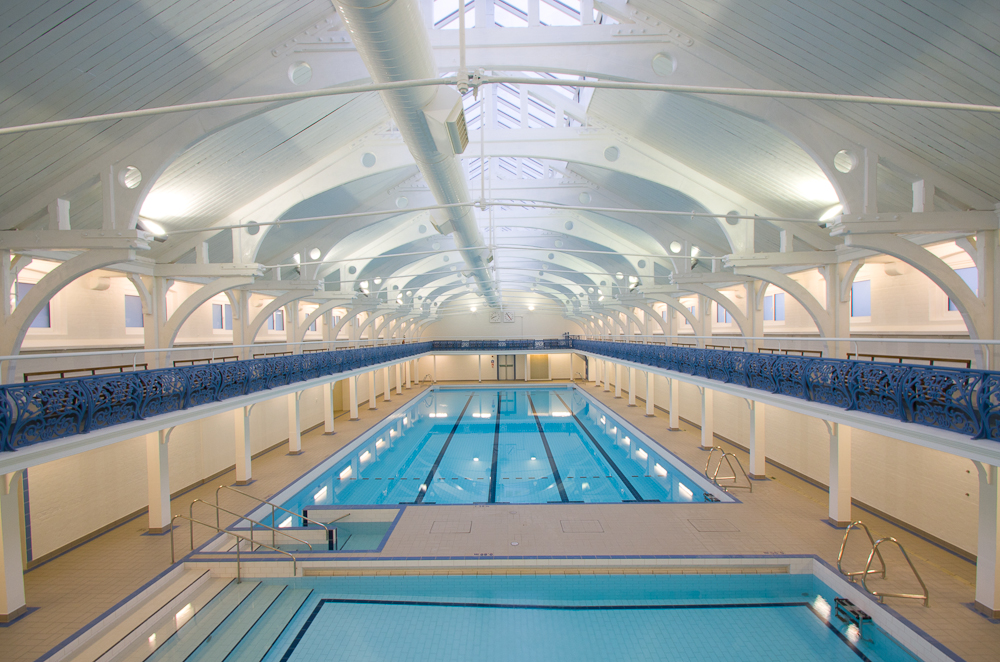
View from the balcony of the swimming pool after refurbishment completed in February 2011

Funding of £1.45 million was confirmed on 31 March 2009 for improving the centre with the total refurbishment budget from all sources amounting to £4.7 million. Additional funds came from the Southwark Investing in Leisure programme of more than £2 million and the Youth Capital Fund allocated £576,000 in May 2009 for a council managed youth programme within the site. The building was closed from Wednesday 25 November 2009.

The pool and learner pool reopened on 28 February 2011 with an opening event in Artichoke Place on Saturday 12 March 2011. The entrance, reception and café area have been renovated and include wheelchair access.

Renovations include:

- Compliance with disability guidelines includes a hearing induction loop and visual impairment support.
- The pools are separated by a new boom and a pool hoist is available for disabled access. A family changing area and two disabled changing rooms have been added.
- Energy efficiency upgrades include the pool hall, corridor, windows and roof being refurbished, installation of a new electricity supply and energy-saving lighting and there are new air handling and heat recovery units. An ultraviolet filter reduces the need for chlorine and improves water conditions.
- The changing rooms now meet Sport England guidelines.

The gym underwent refurbishment and was due to reopen as a larger capacity gym in 2016.

== History ==
A Camberwell Baths existed in Addington Square next to the Grand Surrey Canal. It was one of south London’s first swimming baths, which opened in 1820. Another outdoor pool opened a few years later, on the canal bank, behind the houses on the east side of the square0.

Seven Commissioners were charged in 1887 by the Vestry of Camberwell with the task of establishing three Public Baths and Wash-houses in the Parish of Camberwell, one in each of the parliamentary divisions of North Camberwell, Peckham and Dulwich. Dulwich Public Baths had been opened on Saturday 25 June 1891. In 1903, Warm Baths would open on Wells Street, closely followed in 1905 by the Old Kent Road Swimming and Warm Baths and Wash-houses, with its own Victorian-style Turkish baths, the first to be provided by a London borough.

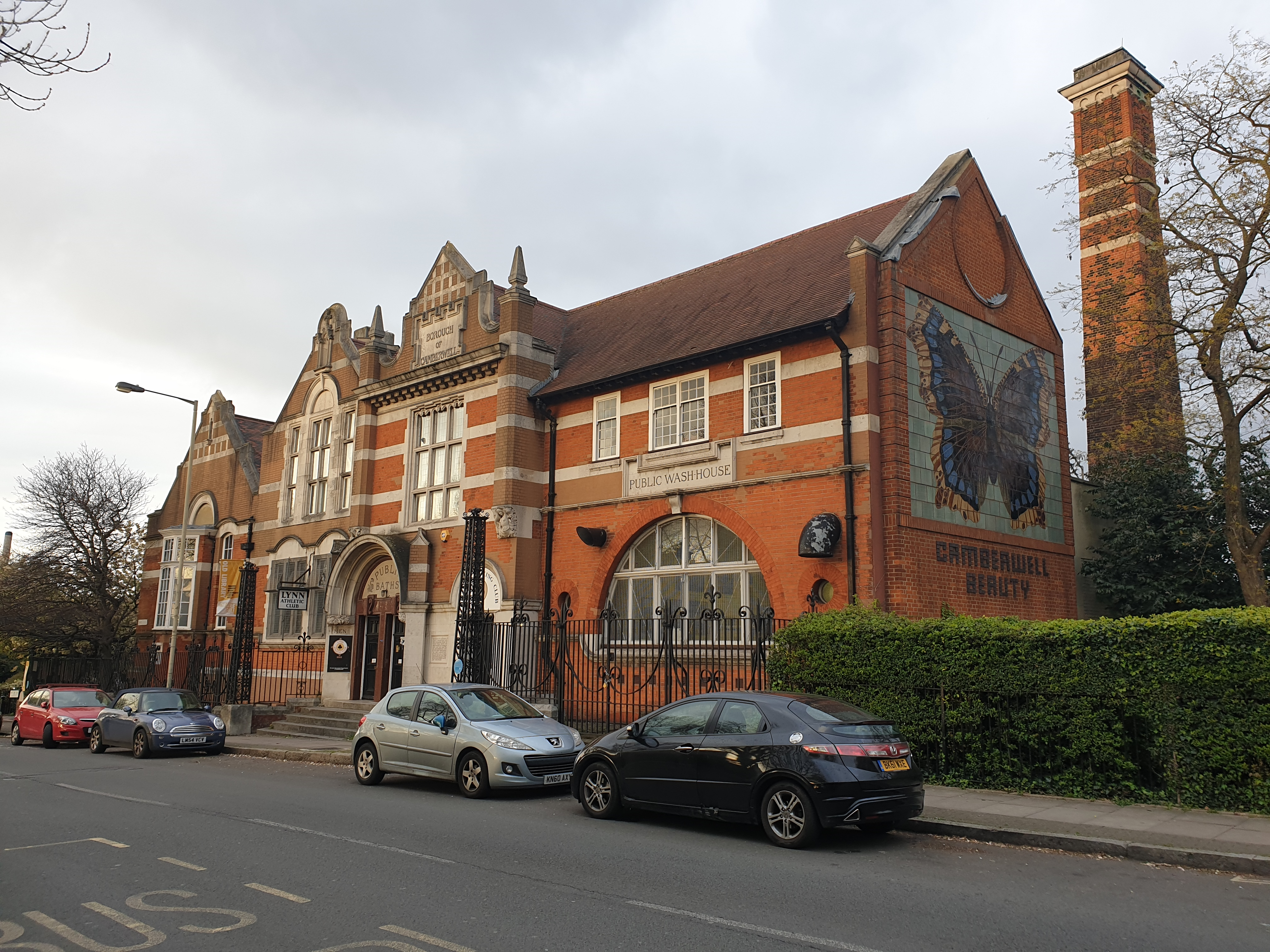
Old Camberwell Baths on Wells Way

Camberwell Public Baths officially opened on 1 October 1892. The baths were built, at a cost of £28,575, with two large swimming pool halls, one behind the other.

The original facilities at the baths in 1892 were:

- Men's First Class: 24 private baths, one public swimming bath 120 feet (37 m) by 35 feet (11 m) with 81 dressing boxes at the side
- Men's Second Class: 40 private baths, one public swimming bath, 120 feet (37 m) by 35 feet (11 m) with 65 dressing boxes
- Ladies First Class; 12 private baths
- Ladies Second Class: 20 private baths
- Public Laundry: 78 compartments
- Establishment Laundry

The original pay box remains in the building entrance. Camberwell was one of the first baths with electric lighting, powered with its own generator. There was an apartment at the rear of the building for an engineer who also served Dulwich Baths.

By 1903 the baths were officially reported as failing to achieve their goal of being self-sufficient, being in deficit by £7,000.

By 1913 the site of the old Camberwell Baths in Addington Square had become a Council depot. In 2001 there was national press interest when lifeguards at the baths refused to support nude swimming sessions of the Gay London Swimming group. The group agreed to provide their own lifeguards.

=== Opening ceremony ===
On 1 October 1892, the Commissioners marked the opening of Camberwell Baths by inviting the Lord Mayor of London, accompanied by City Aldermen, the Chief Magistrate and a display of "brazen instruments, the prancing of sleek City horses, gorgeous equipage, ornately attired footmen, flags and banners". A guard of honour was provided by the First Surrey Rifles as the visiting dignitaries entered Artichoke Row. Music was played by the 'P' Division band, including pieces such as "The Queen's Westminster Volunteers". Guests included MPs for the Borough, Members of the London County Council, the architects, Spalding and Cross as well as the builders, Balaam Brothers.

The chairman of the Commissioners, James Tresidder Sears, said that he "sincerely trusted that better health, brighter homes and happier lives would be the outcome of the continued use of these establishments." After a speech by the Lord Mayor, the pool was opened with a first plunge taken by boys from twelve neighbouring Board schools. Miss Nellie Easton and her pupils were to give a "most interesting and pretty" display of swimming and floating. The crowd was further entertained with exhibition swims by W. Dale, 100 yards Amateur Champion of South London, and W. J. Stratton, 150 yards Champion of London. Finally, a water polo match was held between two teams from the Surrey County Water Polo Association.

=== Civic events and meetings ===
The swimming baths were shut during the winter months, and floors were laid over them to convert them for use for other sports and entertainments. Camberwell used the space for indoor cricket and tennis, as well as dances, concerts and other civic events and celebrations.

By 1941, during the second world war, the only swims available in Southwark were in the First Class Swimming Baths at Camberwell and Dulwich. The swimming baths had been kept full of water to provide a static water supply for the Auxiliary Fire Service. The dances resumed after the war, and new sprung floors were ordered during the 1950s as the Council initiated its own municipal dances on Christmas Eve, New Year's Eve and St Patrick's Day.

The baths were a location for public meetings. Events included:

- 17 January 1906, the Liberal election victory for North Camberwell was announced by Thomas Macnamara from an upper floor window at the baths to a public crowd of an estimated 20,000.
- 11 December 1908, an exhibition of protest banners by the National Society for Women's Suffrage.
- 8 March 1934, an LCC election meeting including the support of Lord Beaverbrook was interrupted by several spontaneous fights and one steward was carried out due to his injuries.

== See also ==
- Alfred Cross, Henry Spalding
- Dulwich Public Baths
