= Edward Habershon =

British architect (1826–1900)

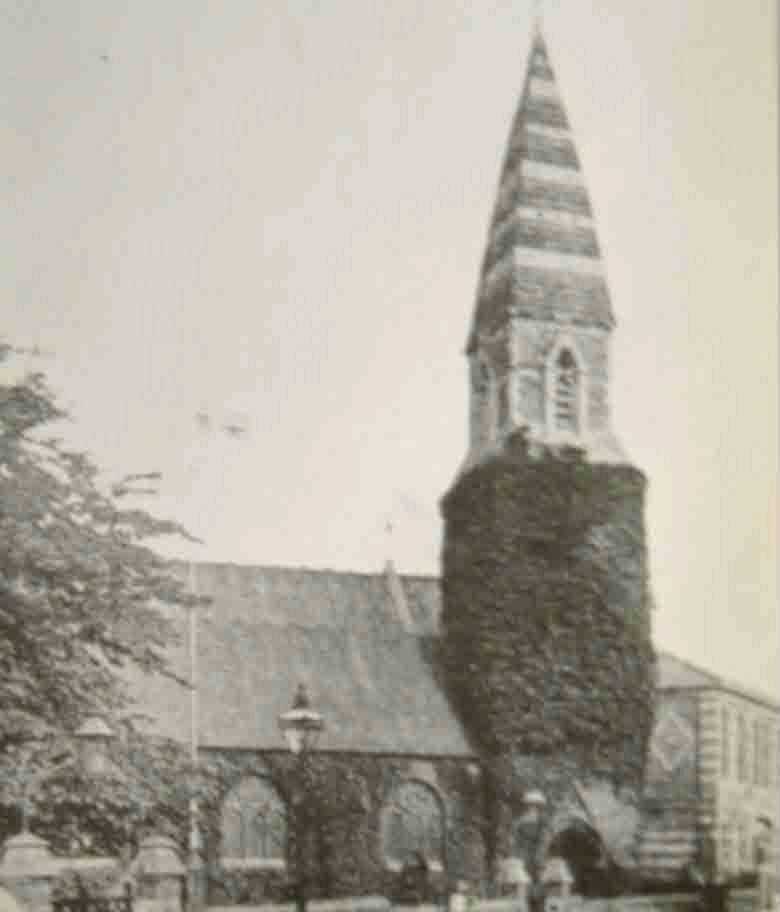
- St Andrew's Church, Queen Street, Hastings, built 1869
- Born: Matthew Edward Habershon; 18 July 1826; Hampstead, England
- Died: 18 August 1900 (aged 74); Leatherhead, England
- Education: Apprenticed to his father Matthew Habershon
- Occupation: Architect
- Practice: (1) E & W.G. Habershon 1852–1863; (2) Habershon & Spalding 1863–1865; (3) Habershon, Spalding & Brock 1865–1879.
- Buildings: St John the Baptist's Church, Hove; St Leonards-on-Sea Congregational Church; Holy Trinity Church, Ebernoe; St Andrew's Church, Hastings; St Mark's Church, Horsham; St John the Evangelist Church, Copthorne
- Projects: involved in relocation of London's burial grounds, 1862

Matthew Edward Habershon (18 July 1826 – 18 August 1900), known as Edward Habershon, was an architect practising in London and south-east England. He specialised in neo-gothic buildings, especially churches and chapels. With his brother W.G. Habershon he designed St John the Baptist's Church, Hove, now a Grade II building. With E.P.L. Brock he designed a number of churches including St Leonards-on-Sea Congregational Church, also listed at Grade II. He designed St Andrew's Church in Hastings, where Robert Tressell's large mural (now in Hastings Museum) was created. In 1862 he was involved in the relocation of London's burial grounds, moving more than one thousand hundredweight of human remains.

== Biography ==
=== Family ===
Matthew Edward Habershon – generally known as Edward – was the son of the architect Matthew Habershon (born 1789, Rotherham; died 5 July 1852, Bethnal Green). and his wife Sarah Gilbee (1796–1851). Matthew practised in London and apprenticed his sons. The elder son was William Gillbee Habershon (24 February 1819 – 24 August 1892). and the younger was Edward (born Hampstead 18 July 1826; died Leatherhead 18 August 1900)

Edward married the widow Frances Elizabeth Williams née Heathcote (1822–1901) in Kensington in 1857. They had two children: Edward Neston Williams Habershon (1859–1933), and Alice Maud Habershon (born 1863). Around 1863 Edward and his family moved to Speldhurst and Lee in Kent; by 1881 they had moved permanently to Charlwood Park, Surrey; being self-supporting he could call himself a gentleman. In the 1901 Census for Reigate Mrs Frances Elizabeth Habershon, in the last year of her life, is living with two companions who are "in charge", and she is described as "eccentric".

=== Career ===
When their father Matthew Habershon died on 5 July 1852, Edward and his brother William Gilbert Habershon inherited a large office in London, and a partnership which trained many architects, including Henry Spalding (ca.1838–1910) and E.P.L. Brock (1833–1895) who were articled to the brothers in 1857.

On 9 February 1852, Edward was made ARIBA and on 5 November 1860 he was made FRIBA.

In 1862 Edward Habershon was involved in the relocation of London's burial grounds, notably at Cure's College.

I did it wholesale and had 220 very large cases made each containing 26 human bodies besides children and these weighed 4 3/4 cwt. There were 1,035 cwt of human remains sent in these cases alone. They were conveyed in the night and the Cemetery Company made arrangements for them. Each body has cost us less than three shillings. It was fortunate that such reasonable terms could be made at Woking Cemetery.

A more horrible business you can scarcely imagine; the men could only continue their work by the constant sprinkling of disinfectant powder. Mine was no easy task for the Bishop, the Warden, the parishioners and particularly the relatives have watched the steps taken, and the interviews with people and the correspondence has been great but all are more satisfied than could be expected.

— Architect Edward Habershon on the relocation of Cure's College burial ground, October 1862.

In 1863 the London practice was dissolved and Edward Habershon went into partnership with Henry Spalding. In 1865 they joined in partnership with Edgar Philip Loftus Brock. In 1873 Spalding left the practice. Edward retired in 1879 and Brock carried on the practice, being admitted to FRIBA on 20 March 1882, one of his proposers being Edward Habershon.

== Works in partnership with W.G. Habershon ==
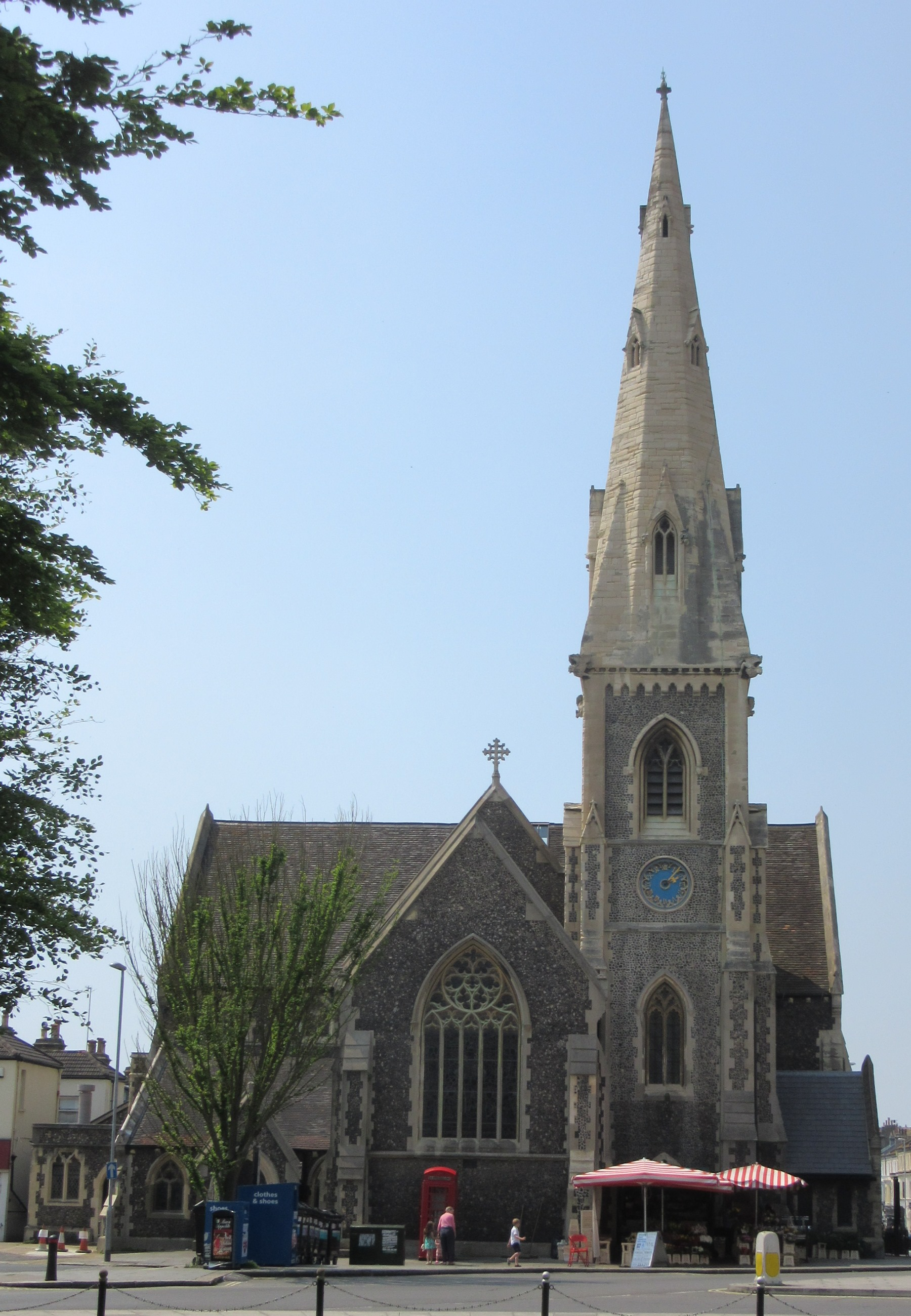
St John the Baptist, Hove, 1852–1854

This practice operated at 38 Bloomsbury Square, London WC from 1852 to 1863.

=== Designed ===
==== Llanarth Court, Monmouthshire ====
A large reconstruction of an ancient house, undertaken in 1849-1851. The result was described by the architectural historian John Newman as a "Neo-classical monster".

==== Holy Trinity Church, Blendworth ====
This church was built in 1851–52 to serve the Hampshire villages of Blendworth and Horndean. It is Decorated Gothic Revival in style with a tall spire.

==== St John the Baptist's Church, Hove ====
This church was built between 1852 and 1854. It has a three-stage tower (with ashlar spire that was added later) and is dressed with knapped flint and stone. The interior has carved corbels In the 1850s Robert William Edis was apprenticed to the brothers.

==== All Saints' Church, Belvedere ====
The Habershons built this church as a proprietary chapel for Sir Culling Eardley, 3rd Baronet. Work took place between 1853 and 1861. It is now a Church of England parish church and has Grade II listed status.

==== Belvedere railway station (demolished) ====
The original Belvedere railway station was built at the same time as All Saints' Church. It was demolished and replaced in 1968 and again in 2000.

==== Duncrub House and chapel ====
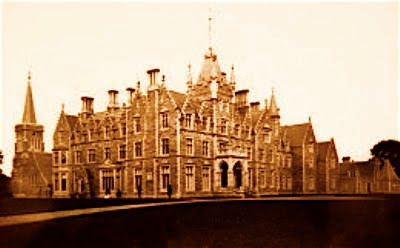
Duncrub House

The foundation stone for this house in Dunning, Perthshire, was laid in 1861, and construction took place 1861–1863. It was designed as a gothic mansion and offices for the 10th Lord Rollo (1835–1916). In 1950 it was demolished, leaving part of a corridor link with the chapel, and the laundry building containing some masonry of 1773 and 1800. The 1858 chapel is a B-listed building. and is described thus: "Early pointed, bull-faced coursed rubble with ashlar dressings. East apse, south aisle, north-west tower with slated spike spire. Modern doorway in west gable." It has been a shed and sports hall, and as of 2013 was a holiday home.

==== 76 to 90 Kensington Park Road (even numbers on east side) ====
These London properties were constructed by Philip Rainey in 1859.

==== 78 to 94 Ladbroke Grove (even numbers on east side) ====
These London properties were built in 1861 and thought to have been designed by Edward Habershon.

== Works in partnership with Henry Spalding and E.P.L. Brock ==
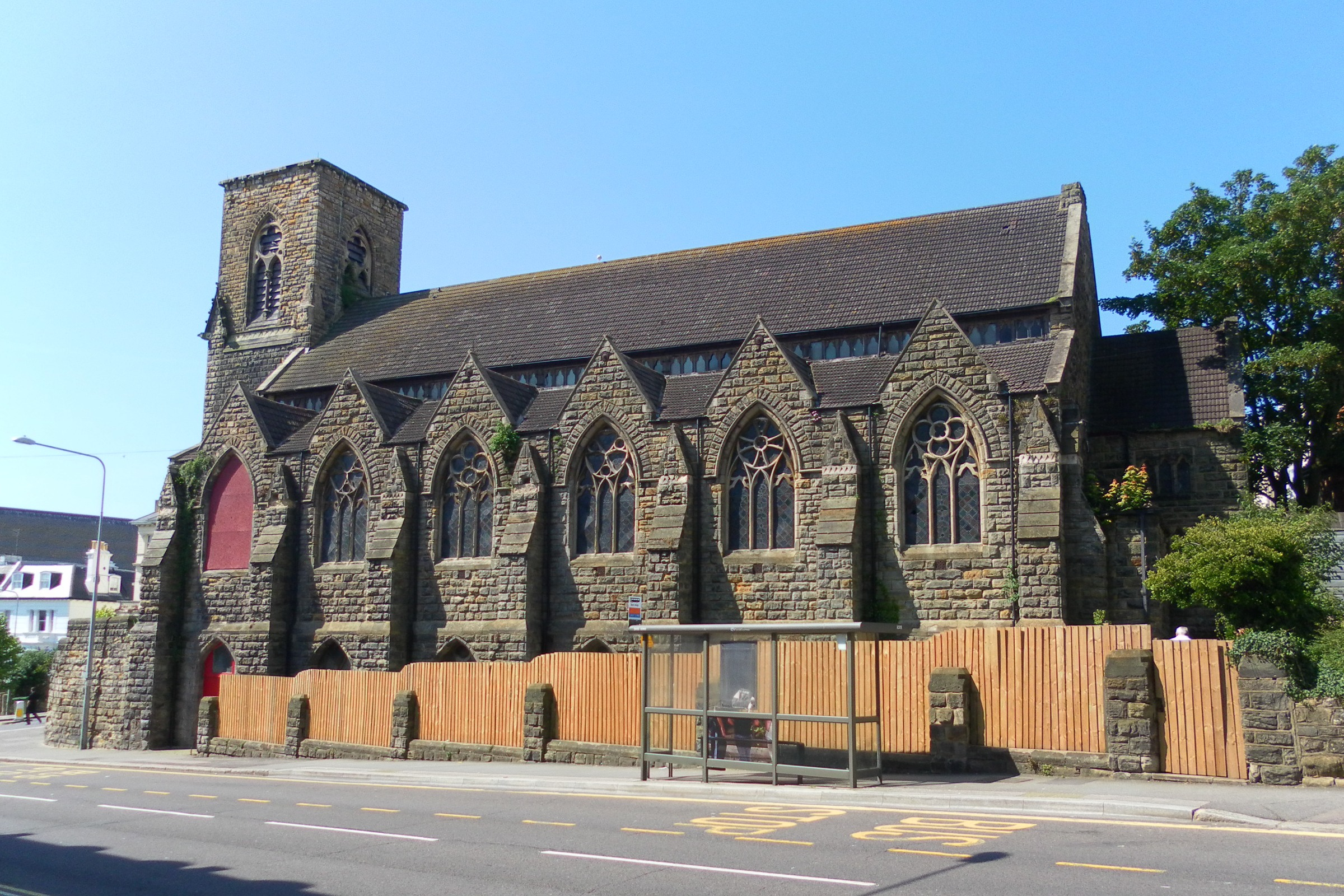
St Leonards-on-Sea with spire missing

These works were carried out under the names of two practices: Habershon & Spalding 1863–1865; and Habershon, Spalding & Brock 1865–1879.

=== Designed ===
==== St Leonards-on-Sea Congregational Church ====
St Leonards-on-Sea Congregational Church was built between February and October 1864. It is built of coursed ore sandstone with Bath Stone ashlar dressings, and had a copper-clad spire which was demolished after the Great Storm of 1987. As a Grade II listed building it is mistakenly credited to Edward's brother William; but it was Edward who was employed in the Habershon-Brock partnership.

==== Holy Trinity, Ebernoe ====
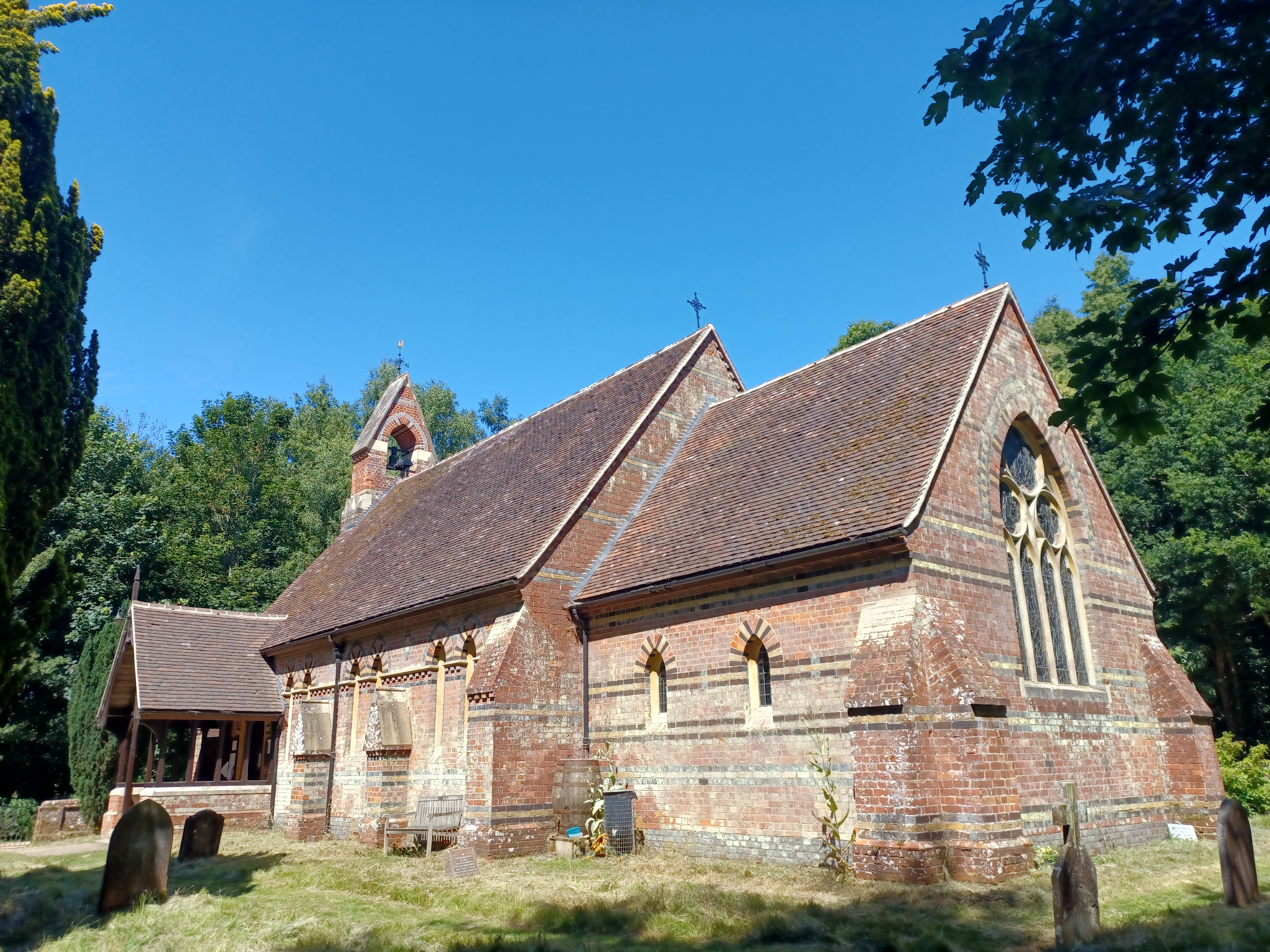
Holy Trinity, Ebernoe

Holy Trinity, the Church of England parish church at Ebernoe, West Sussex, was built at a cost of £1200 of polychrome local brick with an open belfry and steep boarded roof between 1865 and 1867. W.R. Peachey, lord of the manor, laid the foundations stone at the east end. There are no aisles. There are lancet windows in the nave and chancel, the lancets at the west end being trefoiled. The east and west windows have tracery, and there are foliage corbels on the chancel arch. It had a plain interior which was later whitened.

==== Temperance Hotel, now Eskdale Hotel ====
Constructed for Major Malcolm of Burnfoot between 1865 and 1867, this is a B-listed building in High Street, Langholm.

==== St Andrew's, Hastings ====
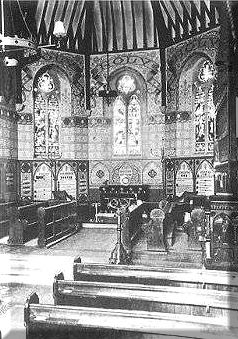
St Andrew's, Hastings, 1869

The foundation stone of St Andrew's Church, Queens Road, Hastings, was laid in November 1869. It was constructed by John Howell, whose fee was £3,235. It held a congregation of 2,000, and was consecrated on 30 November 1870 by Richard Durnford (1802–1895), Bishop of Chichester. It was decorated with a mural by Robert Tressell in 1905. The building survived until 1970 when it was declared unsafe and demolished between August and September of that year. One panel of Tressell's mural was saved, and is now in Hastings Museum. The mural is the Islamic-style decorative work covering the walls around the windows at the east end (see image, right).

==== St Mark, Horsham ====
St Mark at Horsham was a complete rebuild in stages of a previous church which had been designed in 1840 by W. Moseley. The tower and south aisle were built first in 1870; the nave was completed in 1872, and the spire in 1878. The nave had pink granite piers, narrow roofbeams and a pulpit "with figures on the side standing in trefoiled niches" as designed by Habershon and Brock. The surviving spire is square with an octagonal spire, lucarnes and short pinnacles. The exterior of the 1870 building was rough-hewn stone, and the windows had complex tracery. The chancel was added later in 1888 by another architect. Between 1936 and 1949 the church became defunct and was temporarily closed. Services resumed briefly, then it closed again by 1982, to be partially demolished in 1988 to make way for a road and offices. The tower remains.

==== St John the Evangelist, Copthorne ====
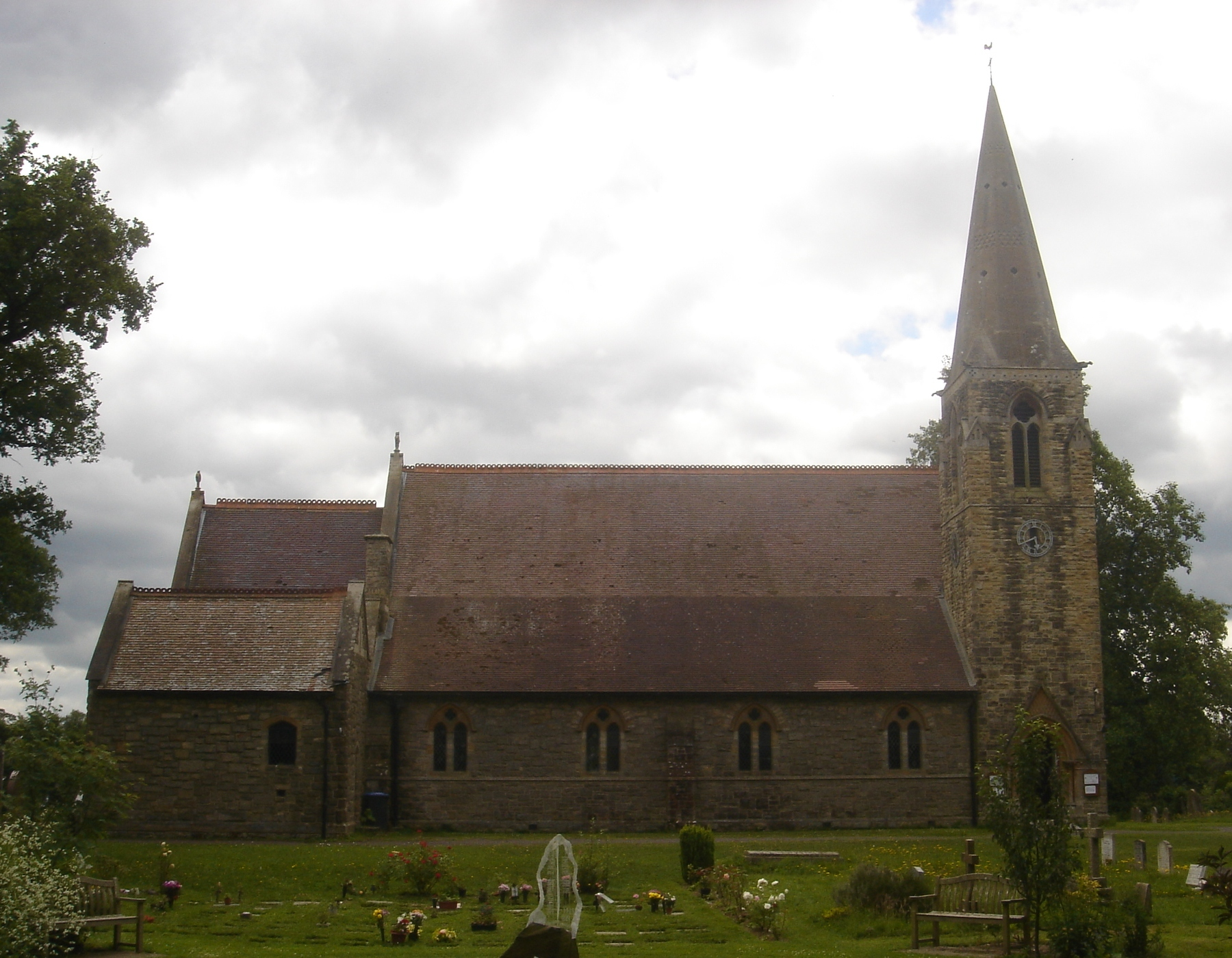
St John, Copthorne

St John at Copthorne, West Sussex was begun in 1877 and consecrated in 1880. It was built in imitation of the late thirteenth-century style. It has a short, north-west tower and a stone broach spire made of smooth ashlar. The main building is faced with roughly dressed stone, and has lancet windows with simple tracery. The entrance is through the base of the tower. The interior is of polychrome brick, with arcades and chancel arch built of stone, and a braced nave roof. The east windows by A. Gibbs are original, being dated 1877; they depict St John, St Peter and the Good Shepherd. There has been some recent adaptation of the interior for liturgical purposes.

=== Restored or altered ===
==== St Mary, Broadwater ====
Restoration work by Habershon and Brock on St Mary, Broadwater is undated. They may have supervised work on the building after the dispute between builder C. Hyde and the church authorities started in 1866.

==== St Giles, Dallington ====
The replacement of the nave of St Giles at Dallington, East Sussex was completed in 1864; it replaces a nave built around the 15th century, and adjoins a 16th-century tower. The 1864 nave has "varnished roof timbers with cusping and rounded ties". There is 15th-century-style tracery, and an arcade with large, crocketed capitals in imitation of an earlier style. The interior is low and without a clerestory, like the previous 15th-century nave that it replaced. The two metal plates bearing the Ten Commandments on the west wall are original to the 1864 rebuild.

==== St Clement, Halton ====
The work on St Clement at Halton, Hastings was completed in 1869 but the building was demolished in 1970. There appears to be no record of the nature of the works by Habershon and Brock.

==== St Leonard, St Leonards-on-Sea ====
St Leonard was completed in 1864, but was bombed in World War II.

== See also ==
- Henry Spalding (architect)

== Bibliography ==
- "Obit of W G Habershon" in The Builder vol.61; p335
- Binney, Marcus; Pearce, David, eds. (1979). Railway Architecture. London: Orbis Publishing Ltd. ISBN 0-906223-62-8.
- Brown, David; Jackson, Alan A. (1990). Network SouthEast Handbook. Harrow Weald: Capital Transport Publishing. ISBN 1-85414-129-5.
- Bullen, Michael; Crook, John; Hubbuck, Rodney; Pevsner, Nikolaus (2010). Hampshire: Winchester and the North. The Buildings of England. London: Yale University Press. ISBN 978-0-300-12084-4.
- Clarke, John M. (2006). The Brookwood Necropolis Railway. Locomotion Papers. Vol. 143 (4th ed.). Usk, Monmouthshire: The Oakwood Press. ISBN 978-0-85361-655-9.
- Elleray, D. Robert (1979). Hastings: a Pictorial History. Chichester: Phillimore & Co. ISBN 0-85033-324-5.
- Elleray, D. Robert (1981). The Victorian Churches of Sussex. Chichester: Phillimore & Co. Ltd. ISBN 0-85033-378-4.
- Elleray, D. Robert (2004). Sussex Places of Worship. Worthing: Optimus Books. ISBN 0-9533132-7-1.
- Newman, John (2000). Gwent/Monmouthshire. The Buildings of Wales. Penguin. ISBN 0-14-071053-1.
