= Tottenham Park Cemetery =

Burial ground in the London Borough of Enfield

Coordinates: 51.6216°N 0.0509°W

Tottenham Park Cemetery is a small (2.4 hectares) burial ground in Edmonton, in the London Borough of Enfield. It was opened in 1912 by the Tottenham Park Cemetery Company, and originally used as a paupers' cemetery. It is owned by Tottenham Park Cemetery Ltd and is used as a mixed faith burial ground.

== Architecture ==
A small brick chapel (disused and derelict) is situated on a central drive lined with lime trees. It is similar in style to chapels of Surbiton Cemetery, Streatham Park Cemetery (also known as the South London Crematorium and Streatham Vale Cemetery) all designed by architect John Bannen.

== Closure ==
After safety concerns were raised by members of the community with Enfield Council, the owners took the decision to close the cemetery on 16 February 2018 to protect the public. Tottenham Park Cemetery is in contact with the local authority to discuss proposals to completing remedial works and opening the site as soon as possible.

== Controversy ==
In September 2018, the police opened an investigation following reports that the cemetery had been unearthing remains without permission and refusing the space for new graves. In the United Kingdom, it is against the Burial Act 1857 to remove buried human remains without a licence from the Secretary of State responsible, or permission from the Church of England if it is consecrated ground.

== Sources ==
- Webb C, revised ed. of Wolfston, P, Greater London Cemeteries and Crematoria, Society of Genealogists, 3rd ed. 1994;
- Hugh Meller & Brian Parsons, 'London Cemeteries, An Illustrated Guide and Gazetteer', 4th edition (The History Press, 2008);
- The Paul Drury Partnership for LB Enfield, 'Montagu Road Cemeteries Conservation Area Character Appraisal', 2006
