= Wapping (disambiguation) =

Wapping is an area in East London, England.

There are various articles associated with Wapping, London:

- St John's Church, Wapping
- Wapping Autonomy Centre, a short-lived social centre
- Wapping dispute, a strike by print workers
- Wapping Hockey Club, in East London
- Wapping Hydraulic Power Station
- Wapping Old Stairs, a comic opera
- The Wapping Project, an arts organisation
- Wapping railway station
- Wapping Wall, a street in Wapping

== Other places ==
- Wapping, a former working class district near Hobart's first wharf
- Wapping Dock, a dock on the River Mersey in Liverpool, England
- Wapping Dock railway station, on the former Liverpool Overhead Railway in Liverpool, England
- Wapping River, a river in the state of Victoria, Australia
- Wapping Tunnel, an old railway tunnel leading to Wapping Dock in Liverpool, England
- Wapping Wharf, a wharf on the floating harbour in Bristol, England

== See also ==
- Battle of Wapping Heights, a battle in Warren County, Virginia, during the American Civil War
- Wappinger, a Native American people from what is now southern New York and western Connecticut
