= Poplar and Stepney Rifles =

17th (County of London) Battalion, London Regiment (Poplar and Stepney Rifles) Tower Hamlets Rifles, The Rifle Brigade 656th Light Anti-Aircraft Regiment, Royal Artillery (Tower Hamlets) TA
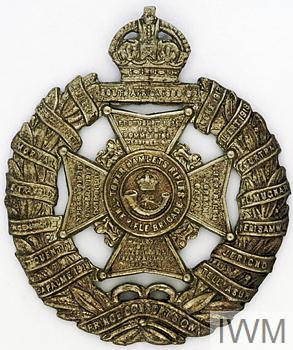
- Cap badge of the Tower Hamlets Rifles, The Rifle Brigade, 1926-1947
- Active: 1860–1967
- Country: United Kingdom
- Branch: Volunteer Force/Territorial Army
- Type: Infantry Battalion; Anti-Aircraft Regiment
- Role: Infantry, Air Defence
- Garrison/HQ: Tredegar Road, Tower Hamlets, London
- Engagements: World War I: Western Front; Salonika; Palestine; World War II: Western Desert; Tunisia; Italy

The 17th (County of London) Battalion, The London Regiment (Poplar and Stepney Rifles), was a unit of Britain's Territorial Force formed in 1908 from Volunteer corps dating back to 1859. It saw considerable service on the Western Front, at Salonika and in Palestine during the First World War. It served as a motorised infantry regiment during the Second World War before conversion to an artillery unit in 1947 and subsequent amalgamation in 1967.

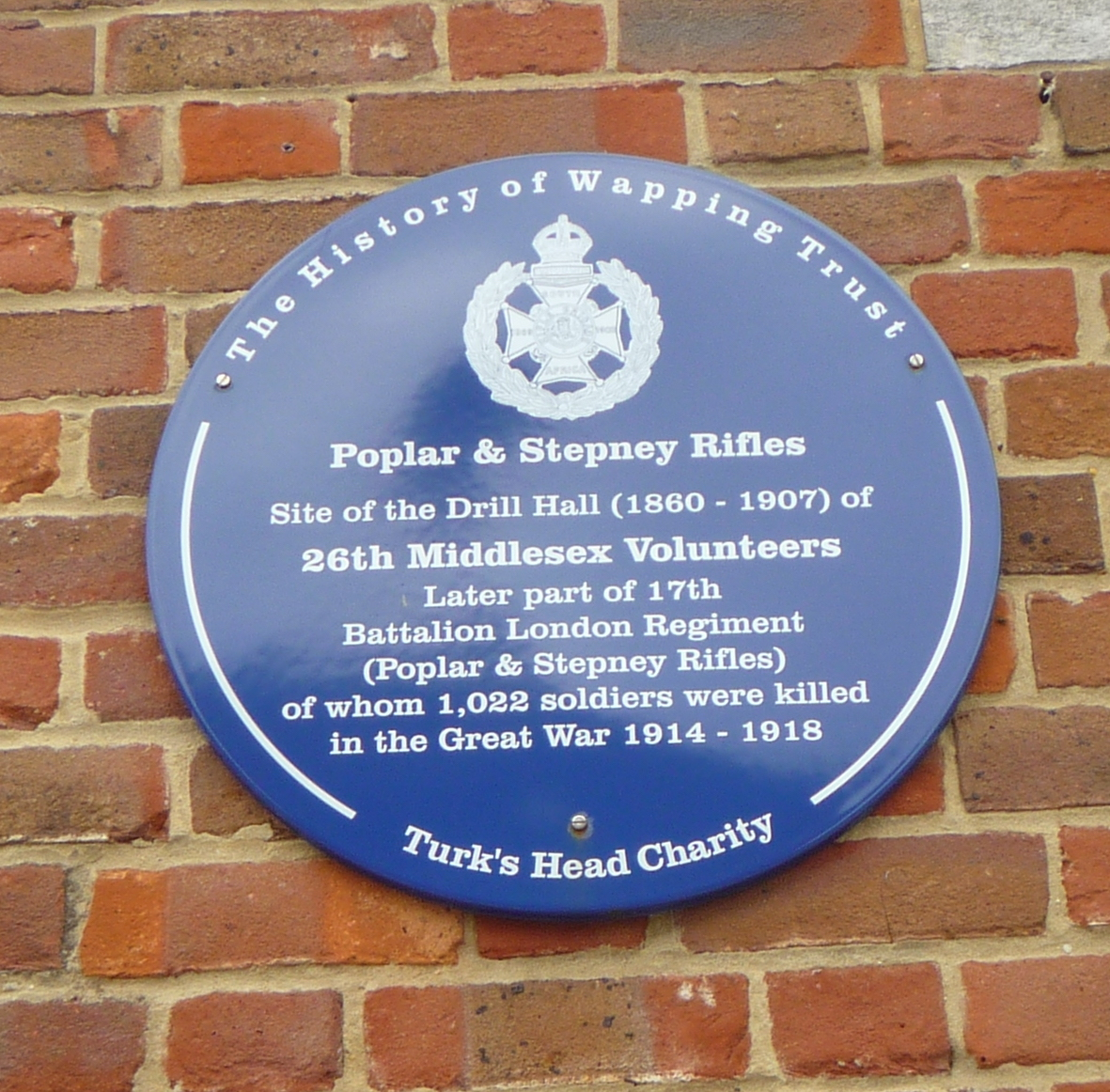
Poplar & Stepney Rifles' memorial plaque on a building in Wapping Wall, next to Shadwell Basin Bridge

== Rifle Volunteers 1859-1908 ==
=== 15th Middlesex (The Customs and Docks) Rifle Volunteer Corps ===
An invasion scare in 1859 led to the creation of the Volunteer Force and huge enthusiasm for joining local Rifle Volunteer Corps (RVCs). The 26th (Customs & Excise) Middlesex RVC of four companies raised on 9 February 1860 was recruited from customs officers in the London docks. Under the command of Major (Lieutenant-Colonel from 1861) Ralph William Grey, former MP and Commissioner of Customs, its early officers included the Principal of Police at the West India Docks, the Inspector-General of Customs, and the Assistant Comptroller-General of Customs. The unit joined the 5th Administrative Battalion of Middlesex RVCs when that was formed in August 1860. The 5th AB also included the 42nd (St Katharine Docks) Middlesex RVC formed on 19 June 1860. The 5th AB and 26th RVC shared a headquarters (HQ) at the Custom House, City of London. The 26th RVC amalgamated with the 9th Tower Hamlets RVC at London Dock House (see below) in 1864, becoming the 26th (The Customs and the Docks) Middlesex RVC, and absorbed the 42nd Middlesex RVC in 1866, doing away with the need for the admin battalion. The 2nd Middlesex Artillery Volunteers, which was recruited in the docks from 1862, was initially attached to the 26th RVC. Edmund Hegan Kennard, MP, a former captain in the 8th Hussars, became Lt-Col Commandant on 3 February 1870.

Under the 'Localisation of the Forces' scheme introduced by the Cardwell Reforms of 1872, RVCs were brigaded into sub-districts with their local Regular and Militia regiments – Brigade Nos 53 and 54 (Rifle Brigade) for the 26th Middlesex RVC and 1st Tower Hamlets AB, alongside the Rifle Brigade (The Prince Consort's Own), the Tower Hamlets Militia, and several other London RVCs.

When the RVCs were consolidated into larger battalions in 1880, the 26th Middlesex RVC (by then with 13 companies) was renumbered 15th (The Customs and Docks) Middlesex RVC on 3 September. The Childers Reforms of 1881 took Cardwell's reforms further, and the Volunteers were formally affiliated to their Regular regiment, the 15th Middlesex RVC becoming the 3rd Volunteer Battalion of the Rifle Brigade on 1 July 1881, but keeping its 15th Middlesex title (it became the 2nd VB, again without change of title, in 1892).

While the sub-districts were often referred to as 'brigades', they were purely administrative organisations and the Volunteers were excluded from the 'mobilisation' part of the Cardwell system. The Stanhope Memorandum of December 1888 proposed a more comprehensive Mobilisation Scheme for Volunteer units, which would assemble in their own brigades at key points in case of war. In peacetime, these brigades provided a structure for collective training. Under this scheme the 15th Middlesex and 2nd Tower Hamlets both joined the East London Brigade, which was administered by the Regimental HQ of the Grenadier Guards. The brigade's assembly point was at Caterham Barracks, the Guards' depot conveniently situated for the London Defence Positions along the North Downs.

Edmund Kennard became the battalion's Honorary Colonel in 1885 and was succeeded in command by Lt-Col Arthur W. Chambers; they continued in these positions until the end of the Volunteer Force in 1908.

==== Second Boer War ====
After Black Week in December 1899, the Volunteers were invited to send active service units to assist the Regulars in the Second Boer War. The War Office decided that one company 116 strong could be recruited from the volunteer battalions of any infantry regiment that had a regular battalion serving in South Africa. The 15th Middlesex RVC contributed volunteers to those raised by the Rifle Brigade's VBs, who earned the battalion its first Battle honour: South Africa 1900–01.

=== 2nd Tower Hamlets Rifle Volunteer Corps ===
RVCs were also raised in the Tower Hamlets, the villages of London's East End that constituted the Tower division of the County of Middlesex owing military obligations to the Constable of the Tower of London rather than to the Lord Lieutenant of Middlesex. The 1st Administrative Battalion, Tower Hamlets RVCs was formed in May 1861 to administer the following units:

- 3rd (Truman, Hanbury, Buxton) Tower Hamlets RVC, formed on 4 May 1860 at Truman, Hanley & Buxton's Black Eagle Brewery in Spitalfields under the command of the owner, Capt Sir Fowell Buxton, 3rd Baronet, with his uncle and business partner Charles Buxton, MP, as lieutenant. The corps had three companies by June 1861 and four by 1863.
- 7th (Mile End) Tower Hamlets RVC, formed on 13 September 1860, HQ at 11 Floreston Street, Mile End Road.
- 9th (London Docks) Tower Hamlets RVC, formed at London Dock House on 23 November 1860; amalgamated with 26th (Customs & Excise) Middlesex RVC (see above) in 1864.
- 10th (Finsbury) Tower Hamlets RVC, formed as two companies at Goodman's Fields on 13 December 1860, HQ at Mile End Gate, then 11 Great Garden St from 1865
- 11th (East Metropolitan) Tower Hamlets RVC: a meeting at Zetland Hall, Goodmans Fields, on 4 December 1860 agreed to form an RVC from London's Jewish population. Two companies were quickly formed and the officers were commissioned on 21 February 1861. However, interest waned and there was little financial support form the Jewish community. The unit was disbanded in 1864 amid stories of ill-discipline and general dissatisfaction from all ranks.
- 12th (Stoke Newington) Tower Hamlets RVC, formed as two companies on 24 April 1861; joined the 1st AB in 1863 but absorbed into the 1st London RVC in 1870.

Charles Buxton was promoted to major and then to Lt-Col of the 1st AB on 1 June 1861, when Sir Fowell took the title of Captain-Commandant of the 3rd RVC. followed by Sir Fowell promoted to major on 24 July 1863 and as second Lt-Col on 23 January 1864. Sir Fowell's younger brother, Edward North Buxton, another partner in the brewery, was commissioned as an ensign in the 7th Tower Hamlets RVC on 19 August 1862. Charles Buxton left the 1st AB in the later 1860s, and was appointed Hon Colonel of the 1st (Poplar) Tower Hamlets Artillery Volunteer Corps in August 1870.

Unlike the 15th Middlesex, which retained its HQ at Custom House throughout its existence, the 1st Tower Hamlets AB and its constituent RVCs moved around the East End frequently. By 1866, the HQ of the 1st AB, 3rd and 10th RVCs had moved to 11 Great Garden Street, Whitechapel. In 1870, the 1st AB and 3rd RVC moved to 1 Granby Street, Bethnal Green, while the 7th RVC was at 2 Purim Place, Cambridge Road, Mile End, and the 10th RVC at 5 Paradise Row, Cambridge Road, Bethnal Green. The 1st AB later moved to Commercial Street and then to Quaker Street, Stepney.

In the 1880 consolidation of RVCs, the 1st AB became the 3rd Tower Hamlets RVC on 25 May, but changed to 2nd Tower Hamlets RVC on 3 September. It had the following organisation:

- Battalion HQ at 237 Whitechapel Road
- A, B, C and D Companies (ex 3rd RVC) at Stepney
- E, F, G and H Companies (ex 7th RVC) at Mile End
- I, K and L Companies (ex 10th RVC) at Finsbury

Like the 15th Middlesex, the battalion had been attached to the Rifle Brigade since 1872, and it too became a volunteer battalion of that regiment on 1 July 1881. Although it ranked as the 10th VB (9th from 1892) it retained its 2nd Tower Hamlets title.

The East End was grossly overcrowded and it was difficult to find space to hold drills. Many people resented the volunteers using London's public parks, and in June 1881 crowds disrupted a joint inspection of the 2nd Tower Hamlets and 10th Middlesex RVCs being held in Regent's Park.

Sir Fowell Buxton retired from the command in 1883 and became the battalion's Hon Colonel in 1884. W.N. Bryan became Lt-Col from 12 October 1889. The battalion served alongside the 15th Middlesex in the East London Brigade from 1889, and it moved to its final HQ at 66 Tredegar Road, Bow, in 1894.

Like the 15th Middlesex, the 2nd Tower Hamlets RVC sent volunteers to the Boer War, earning the battalion the battle honour South Africa 1900–02.

==== 1st (Duke of Norfolk's Own) Cadet Battalion, Rifle Brigade ====
A cadet battalion of four companies was formed for East End boys in the Tower Hamlets on 28 May 1904, with HQ at Mile End. It was disbanded in 1906.

== Territorial Force ==
When the Volunteers were subsumed into the new Territorial Force (TF) under the Haldane Reforms of 1908, the various volunteer infantry units in the County of London were formed into a new all-TF London Regiment that had no regular or militia components. The 15th Middlesex and 2nd Tower Hamlets were combined to form a new 17th (County of London) Battalion, London Regiment (Poplar & Stepney) of eight companies with HQ at Tredegar Road. The new title indicated the two London metropolitan boroughs (Poplar and Stepney) from which the battalion recruited

The battalion left the East London Brigade and joined the 5th London Brigade in the TF's 2nd London Division.

== World War I ==
=== Mobilisation ===
The infantry battalions of the 2nd London Division had just reached Perham Down on Salisbury Plain for their annual training when war broke out on 4 August 1914. They immediately returned to their London HQs. 17th Londons mobilised at Tredegar Road under the command of Lt-Col J. Godding, CO since 19 March 1913. This process was completed by mid-August, and the London battalions marched to their war stations around St Albans in Hertfordshire, with 5th London Bde grouped round Hatfield. Here the division formed part of Third Army in Central Force for home defence, and carried out its war training.

The TF was intended to be a home defence force for service during wartime and members could not be compelled to serve outside the country. However, on 10 August 1914, TF units were invited to volunteer for overseas service and the majority did so. On 15 August, the War Office issued instructions to separate those men who had signed up for Home Service only, and form these into reserve units. On 31 August, the formation of a reserve or 2nd Line unit was authorised for each 1st Line unit where 60 per cent or more of the men had volunteered for Overseas Service. The titles of these 2nd Line units would be the same as the original, but distinguished by a '2/' prefix. In this way, duplicate battalions, brigades and divisions were created, mirroring those TF formations being sent overseas. Later the 2nd Line was prepared for overseas service and 3rd Line units were formed to train reinforcements.

=== 1/17th Londons ===
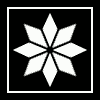
Formation sign of the 47th (2nd London) Division.

In October 1914, the 2nd London Division was selected to be sent to reinforce the British Expeditionary Force (BEF) on the Western Front, and it pushed on with organisation and training. On 2 March 1915 it was ordered to France and on 9–10 March 5th London Brigade embarked and landed at Le Havre. It was sent to a concentration area at Nord preparatory to joining Second Army in the Ypres Salient, but orders were changed and the rest of the division was diverted to Béthune to reinforce First Army after its losses in the Battle of Neuve Chapelle. 5th London Bde was brought down from Cassel in London motor buses. Parties from each unit were attached to Regular units in the line, then whole battalions were attached to brigades of 2nd Division at Givenchy for familiarisation in Trench warfare. On 25 April, the division took over its own section of the line, with 5th London Bde in the Festubert sector. There was heavy fighting in the adjacent sector on 9 and 15–18 May (the Battle of Aubers Ridge), but although some London units were used in support of the fighting formations, 1/17th Londons was not engaged.

On arrival in France, the 2nd London Division was generally referred to simply as 'The London Division' to distinguish it from the Regular 2nd Division, but on 15 May the division and its brigades were numbered, becoming 47th (2nd London) Division and 141st (5th London) Brigade respectively.

The division's first attack was in the Battle of Festubert from 24 to 27 May, but again 141st Bde was in support and not closely engaged. In early June, the division took over the Vermelles sector, south of the La Bassée Canal and opposite the mining town of Loos.

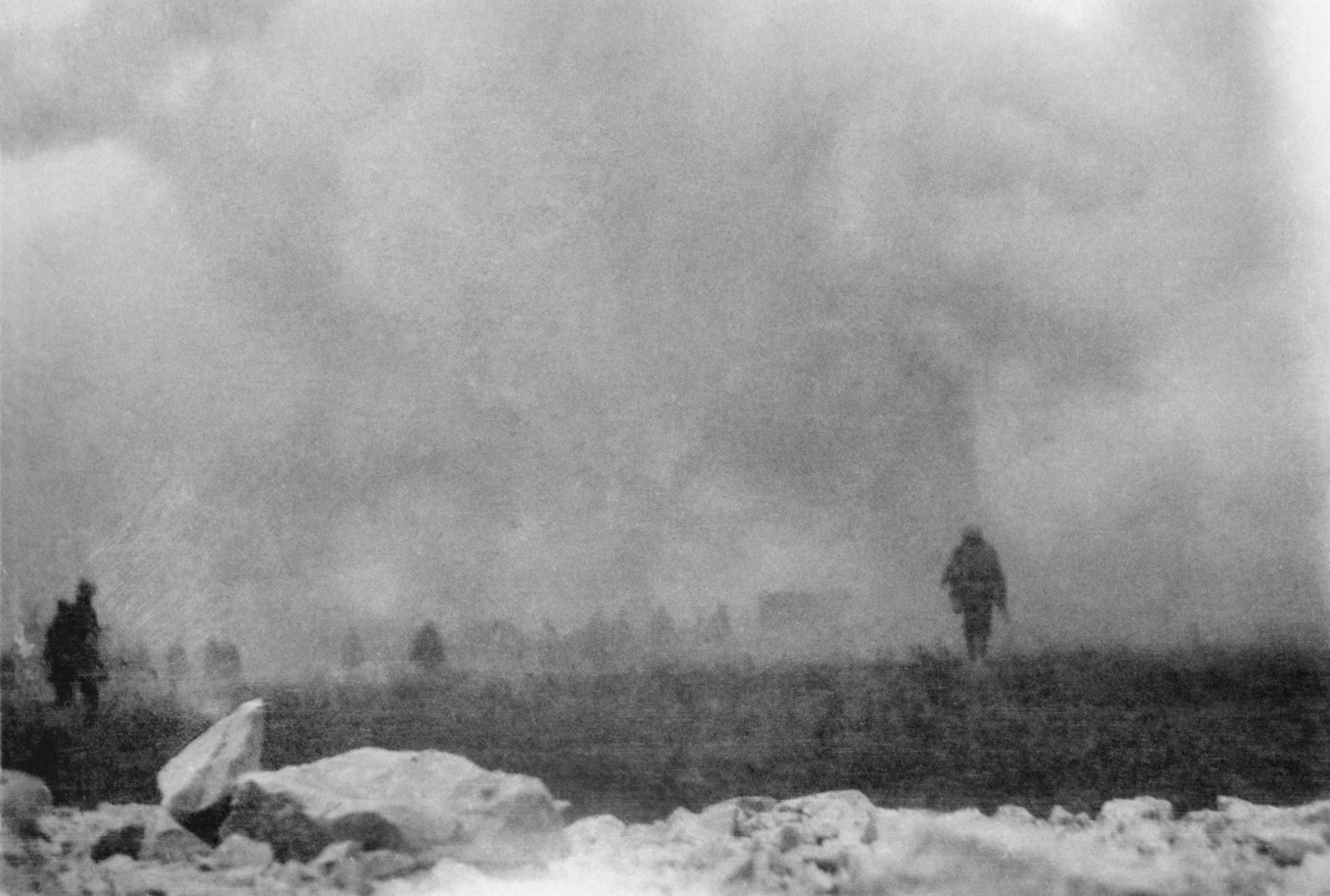
Troops of 47th (2nd L) Division advance through the gas and smoke cloud at Loos.

==== Loos ====
Loos had been selected for the BEF's Autumn offensive (the Battle of Loos) and the summer was spent in preparation, including a 1,500 yards (1,400 m) long trench that 141st Bde began digging in No man's land on 27 August. This was to be the jumping-off line for the attack, and was equipped with recesses for gas cylinders (the BEF was to use chemical weapons for the first time); a second assembly trench was also dug 50 yards (46 m) behind. The battalions then underwent rehearsals for the roles they were to play in the attack. For the opening assault on 25 September, 1/17th Londons under Lt-Col Godding was in brigade reserve and was left in the original British front line while rest of the brigade advanced at 06.30 behind the gas cloud and smoke screen towards Loos. By 09.30, one company of 1/17th Bn had been sent up to reinforce 1/20th Bn in its attack on the Chalk Pit. At the end of the day, the brigade had reached the mining spoilheap known as the Loos Crassier, but it was held by only two companies (one from 1/17th) and a platoon, and was unable to provide much flank protection for the neighbouring division which suffered heavy casualties. Two days later 141st Bde captured further German strongpoints, with 1/17th Bn supplying the 'bombers' who led the attack into the German trenches. After holding its positions, 141st Bde was relieved by 142nd Bde on the night of 28/29 September, but the following night 1/17th Bn went back into the line with 142nd Bde to relieve the 3rd Guards Bde on Hill 70. They were finally relieved by French troops and went into reserve. 141st Brigade was not called upon during the German counter-attacks on 8 October or the British attack on the Hohenzollern Redoubt on 13 October.

47th (2nd L) Division spent the next month holding and repairing the battered trenches at the head of the salient created by the Battle of Loos. It went into corps reserve on 15 November, but returned a month later, suffering a steady trickle of casualties to small arms, shellfire and mining. The division took over the Souchez sector on Vimy Ridge on 16 March 1916. This sector had been quiet, but both sides commenced mining. On 26 April, a German mine broke 141st Bde's front line, but rifle fire from 1/17th Londons helped to prevent the German attack and the defenders seized the crater and consolidated the far lip. Over the following weeks, 141st Bde had to provide large working parties for the Royal Engineers' counter-mining. The Germans launched an attack on 21 May, isolating the division's forward trenches and crater positions with a Box barrage and capturing most of them in the confusion; the division suffered additional casualties in counter-attacks trying to regain the lost positions. Afterwards, the division was relieved in the line.

==== Somme ====
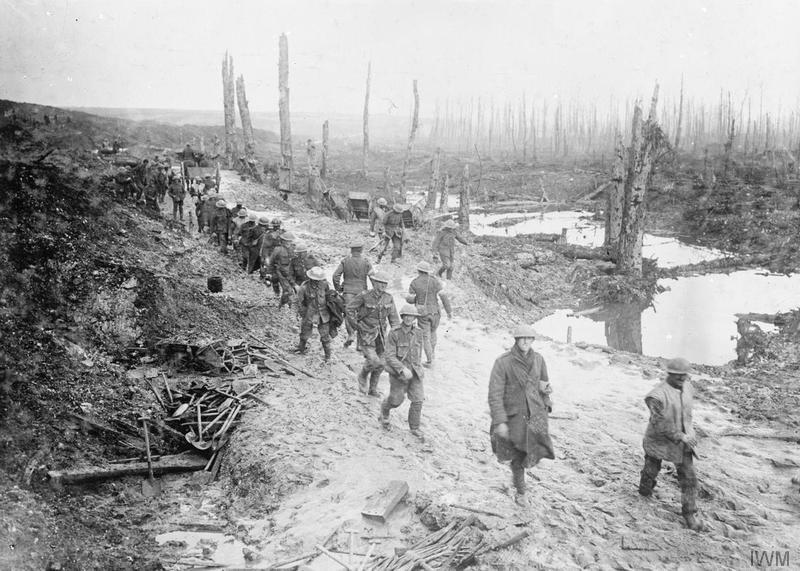
Men of the 17th (County of London) Battalion, London Regiment (Poplar and Stepney Rifles), 47th (2nd London) Division, crossing a muddy area in the Ancre valley, October 1916. (IWM Q1561)

The BEF was now preparing for its summer 'Big Push' (the Battle of the Somme). 47th (2nd L) Division was posted back to the Angres sector, which was quiet, but where it carried out numerous raids to distract German attention from the Somme. The division's units were brought up to strength with drafts of reinforcements, and on 1 August it began marching south to join in the offensive. First it carried out intensive training, then from 1 September 141st Bde began rehearsing across a flagged course representing the ground to be attacked. Between 10 and 12 September it moved into position in High Wood. 47th (2nd L) Division's objective was to capture the remainder of the wood in conjunction with the tank attack at Flers–Courcelette. At 06.30 on 15 September 1/17th Londons attacked as the right hand battalion of 141st Bde. The four tanks allotted to the division could make no headway through the broken tree stumps, and 1/17th had a desperate fight for every inch of their advance. When the second wave advanced later in the morning five battalions were engaged in the wood. At 11.00 a second artillery bombardment of the wood was arranged and this in conjunction with the divisional trench mortars succeeded in demoralising the German defenders, who began to surrender. High Wood was reported clear of the enemy by 13.00, and operations on either flank had gone well, but 141st Bde was so disorganised from heavy casualties, particularly among officers, that in the afternoon it was temporarily formed into a composite battalion under Lt-Col Norman of the 1/17th. The night was spent in consolidating the captured ground, which the division held until it was relieved on 19 September.

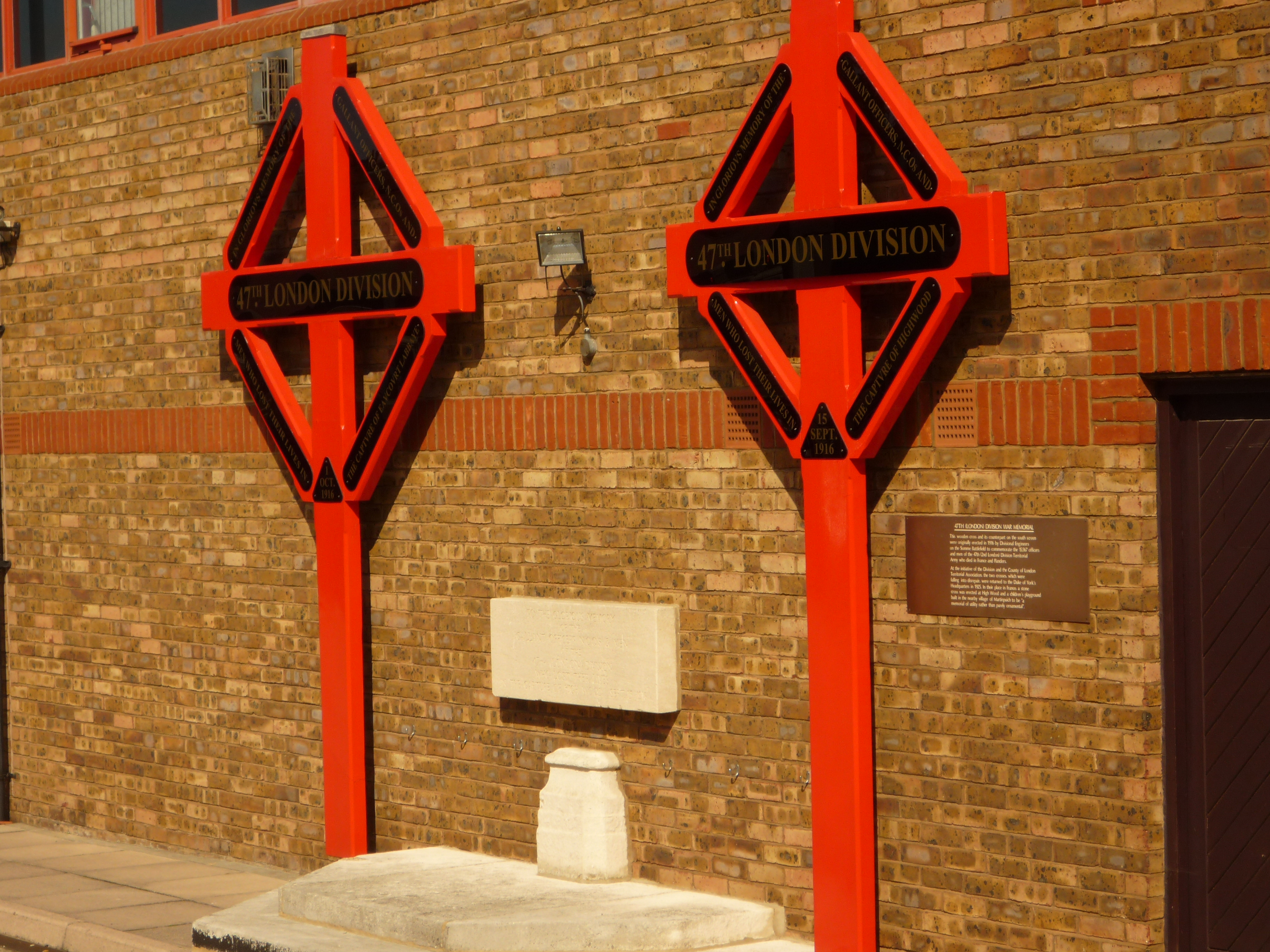
The two wooden memorial crosses that were originally erected at High Wood and Eaucourt l'Abbaye by 47th Divisional Engineers in 1916.

The next phase of the offensive was the Battle of the Transloy Ridges. 141st Brigade went back into the line before dawn on 29 September, and attacked towards Eaucourt L'Abbaye on 1 October, with 1/17th Londons on the left. The battalion ran into uncut barbed wire; a few men got through into the German line but were bombed out again. The brigade completed the Capture of Eaucourt l'Abbaye on 3 October, and was relieved next day, while the rest of the division carried out Attacks on the Butte de Warlencourt on 7–8 October. It then left the Somme sector for rest and reorganisation.

==== Messines ====
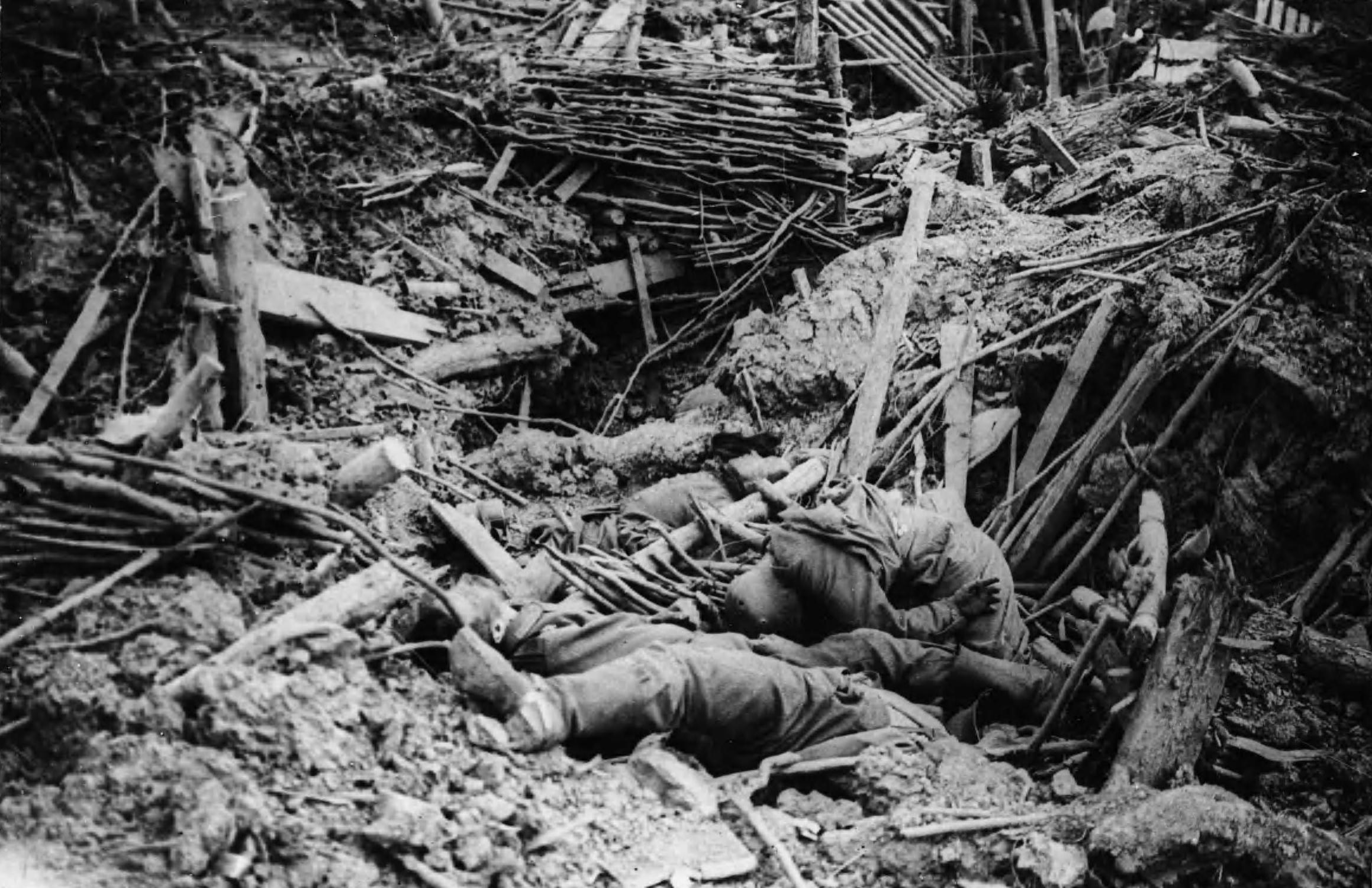
A German trench smashed by the Messines mines on 7 June 1917.

47th (2nd L) Division moved into the Hill 60 sector of the Ypres Salient in October 1916 and took part in regular raids and crater fighting for a number of months. By early May 1917 preparations were in hand for the forthcoming Battle of Messines. In the weeks leading up to the battle, 141st Bde held the divisional front and carried out preparations for the attacks, including digging new trenches and establishing ration and ammunition dumps. For the attack on 7 June, 1/17th Londons were attached to 140th Bde, and rehearsed the attack behind the lines at Steenvoorde. The attack was heralded at Zero hour (03.10) on 7 June by the explosion of 19 huge mines, including a pair under Hill 60 and the 'Caterpillar'. The 300 yards (270 m) wide German front trench system at Hill 60 was so smashed up by the explosions that 140th Bde was able to cross it in 15 minutes, close behind the creeping barrage, and the demoralised defenders surrendered readily. There was harder fighting at the second objective, the 'White Chateau', and it took three attacks to gain a lodgement in the ruins. The survivors of the garrison surrendered at 07.50 after being shelled by trench mortars. 141st Brigade took over holding the new line two days later, until the division was relieved n 13 June. 141st Brigade returned to hold the same line from 3/4 to 25 July.

47th (2nd L) Division was not directly involved in the Third Ypres Offensive that followed, being in reserve during the Battle of Pilckem Ridge (31 July–2 August) but spending two periods holding the line (18 August–2 September and 8–17 September), described as 'among the most unpleasant in its experience'. It then took over the line in the quiet Gavrelle–Oppy sector, which was defended by a series of defended localities rather than continuous trench lines.

==== Bourlon Wood ====
In November, the division carried out a long roundabout march to the Cambrai sector where the BEF's Third Army had recently carried out as successful attack with tanks (the Battle of Cambrai). On 28/29 November, 47th (2nd L) Division was put in to defend the recently captured Bourlon Wood but the Germans launched a counterattack on 30 November. 1/17th Londons was the support battalion to 141st Bde in the wood itself and the brigade had suffered badly from gas shelling during the previous 24 hours. The attack followed a heavy bombardment with high explosive and Mustard gas on the brigade's inadequate trenches. 1/17th Londons were called upon about 11.30 to check one enemy advance, 'which it did by good shooting'. The attacks on Bourlon Wood were driven back, but the Germans broke through a neighbouring formation, threatening the whole Bourlon salient. During the night of 4/5 December, the division withdrew to the old Hindenburg Line defences that had been captured on the first day of the battle.

47th (2nd L) Division spent the winter in rest and reorganisation, 141st Bde billeted round Bouzincourt. By early 1918, the BEF was suffering a manpower crisis, and infantry brigades were reduced from four to three battalions each. As part of this reorganisation in 47th (2nd L) Division, 1/17th Londons moved from 141st to 140th (4th London) Brigade alongside the 15th (Civil Service Rifles) and 21st (First Surrey Rifles) Bns.

==== Spring Offensive ====
When the German Spring Offensive opened on 21 March, 47th (2nd L) Division had just relieved another formation in the line and was holding the right flank of Third Army. The main blow fell on Fifth Army to the south, but the Londoners were heavily bombarded, particularly with mustard gas, and later in the day the Germans attacked behind a smoke screen with little success. However, Fifth Army was collapsing and 47th (2nd L) Division, with its flank open, was obliged to fall back on successive lines of half-dug trenches. The retirement, with rearguards contesting the German advance throughout, went on for six days and casualties were heavy.

The Germans attempted to renew the offensive on 5 April. By now, 47th (2nd L) Division had reorganised. Although 140th Bde was holding the front line, 1/17th Londons were with 141st Bde in divisional reserve at Senlis, which came under heavy bombardment. Fighting went on all day, with reserves fed in progressively until the whole division was in the line. The Germans made some gains, and renewed the attack next day, but the line held. 47th Division was relieved on the night of 6/7 April.

==== Hundred Days Offensive ====
47th (2nd L) Division now had three quiet months, resting and then holding a quiet sector of the line, which gave the battalions time to absorb the hundreds of 18-year-old recruits they were sent to fill up their ranks. Many of the men were also incapacitated for some by the Spanish flu epidemic. The Allied Hundred Days Offensive was launched on 8 August at the Battle of Amiens, and 47th (2nd L) Division joined this on 22 August. 140th Brigade was in reserve, ready to exploit any advance, but the attacking brigades were held up short of the 'Green Line' objective. Leading a follow-up night attack on 23/24 August, 1/17th Londons had little difficulty in securing the Green Line, and in fact went beyond it in the confusion of trenches. Although tired, 140th Bde now passed to the temporary command of 58th (2/1st London) Division in a further 2,000 yards (1,800 m) dawn advance on 25 August in which it captured many prisoners.

On 30 August, 47th (2nd L) Division passed through 12th (Eastern) Division to continue the pursuit of the retreating enemy. On 2 September, 1/17th Londons were in the leading wave advancing towards St Pierre Vaast Wood. It came under artillery and machine gun fire, but, although it had no covering barrage, the battalion reached and occupied a German trench overlooking Moislains. Here, it found not only that the enemy held the village, but also parts of the same trench and even positions in the rear. Although their fire stopped enemy movement across the open, there was a shortage of grenades and the German bombing attacks up the trench were only halted with difficulty and caused serious losses until 141st Bde's reserve battalion mopped up the German parties. 140th Brigade, now down to about 700 men (less than the full strength of a battalion) was withdrawn to rest near Maurepas, later going back by motor bus to Heilly.

After a period of rest, 47th (2nd L) Division was preparing for a move to the Italian Front when it was instead ordered to take part in the final operations on the Western Front. On 1 October, elements of the division hurried forward to keep in touch with the retreating Germans until, on 4 October, it reached a firm German defence line on the Armentières–Wavrin railway embankment covering the approaches to Lille. The advance was resumed on 16 October, and on 28 October the division accompanied Third Army's commander, Sir William Birdwood on his ceremonial entry into Lille. 140th Brigade resumed its place in the line on 31 October and took up positions along the River Schelde. One night, a party of Germans attacked a post held by 1/17th Londons, but the following night they were driven out of the house they occupied. 1/17th Londons suffered the division's last casualties on 8 November. Hearing that Tournai on the other side of the river was unoccupied, the Divisional Engineers threw footbridges across on 9 November; 1/17th made its way across them and after wading though marshes set up a bridgehead. The Armistice with Germany on 11 November found the battalion helping to administer the liberated city.

Over the following days, the division was engaged in repairing the Tournai–Ath railway, then marched back to the Cysoing area. At the end of November, it moved back to winter quarters at Béthune to await demobilisation. The first parties left for home at the beginning of January 1919 and by 28 March all the units had been reduced to cadre strength. The cadres began moving back to the UK in May to be demobilised, the infantry cadres going to Felixstowe, where the 1/17th Londons completed its demobilisation on 30 June 1919.

==== Commanding officers ====
The following officers commanded 1/17th Londons during the war:

- Lt-Col J. Godding to October 1915
- Lt-Col E.H. Norman, DSO, to February 1917
- Maj F.R. Grimwood, DSO, to May 1917
- Lt-Col W.H. Hughes, MC, to February 1918
- Lt-Col F.W. Parish, DSO, MC, to July 1918
- Lt-Col H.S. Kaye, DSO, MC, to demobilisation

=== 2/17th Londons ===
'The Bee' formation sign chosen for 66th (2/2nd London) Division by its commander, Maj-Gen Edward Bulfin.

The 2nd Line battalion was formed on 31 August 1914. At first the recruits lived at home and trained at Tredegar Road in civilian dress, later in a mixture of available clothing. In January 1915, it joined 2/5th London Brigade in 2/2nd London Division at Reigate in Surrey (these formations were numbered 180th Bde and 60th Division respectively in August) and some old .256-in Japanese Ariska rifles arrived for training, which was carried out on Epsom Downs.

In March, the division's units supplied large drafts of reinforcements to their 1st Line units before the latter went to France, and a vigorous recruiting campaign was held to replenish the ranks. 2/2nd London Division then moved to the St Albans area, replacing the 1st Line. In May, the 2/17th Londons moved to Bishop's Stortford. The division continued to send drafts to the battalions serving with the 47th (2nd L) Division. In August, the men who had volunteered for home service only, or were unfit for overseas service, were sent to 107th Provisional Battalion (see below) and replaced by drafts from the 3rd Line battalions, which later took over the role of finding drafts for the 1st Line. In mid-November, the Japanese rifles were handed in and the men received .303-inch Lee-Enfield service rifles. In January 1916, the division became part of the Emergency Reserve and moved to Sutton Veny to complete its battle training on Salisbury Plain.

==== Vimy ====
On 24 April, 60th (2/2nd L) Division was ordered to prepare for a move to France, and 180th Bde landed at Le Havre on 23–24 June. After concentrating, the division moved to Vimy Ridge, where first small parties, then companies and finally whole battalions went into the line for familiarisation alongside the experienced 51st (Highland) Division. 60th (2/2nd L) Division took over the line from 51st (H) Division on the night of 13 July.

Over succeeding weeks, the 2/17th alternated in the L1 sector of the line, in support and in reserve with the 2/19th Londons.The 60th Division adopted coloured flashes painted on each side of the steel helmet to aid recognition: 180th Bde used a triangle, which was black in the case of the 2/17th Bn. During the summer, the brigade was engaged in occasional crater-fighting and trench-raiding. 2/17th Londons carried out a raid on the night of 12/13 August, bombing four dugouts and killing numerous Germans, but were unable to secure a prisoner.

==== Salonika ====
After five months in the line, 60th (2/2nd L) Division had expected to be joining the Somme Offensive; however, on 1 November, it was ordered to prepare to move to the Macedonian front. The units were brought up to strength by drafts from England and went by train to Marseille where they embarked for Salonika. The division assembled in camps there in the first half of December, then the brigades were sent up to the line independently. 180th Brigade was sent in two columns starting on 17 and 18 December to the area round Lake Ardzan for employment on the XII Corps defence line between the rivers Vardar and Spanc. The battalions and companies were spread along the line, with the 2/17th near Snevce by February 1917, constructing and repairing entrenchments, drainage works and roadmaking. The Bulgarians were quiet in this sector, apart from regular air attacks on the brigade and battalion HQs.

During March, 60th (2/2nd L) Division moved into the line west of Lake Doiran in preparation for the forthcoming Allied offensive in this sector (the Battle of Doiran 24–5 April and 8–9 May). 180th Brigade was engaged, but 2/17th Londons were mainly in support. The brigade was withdrawn between 26 and 28 May and concentrated to take over a new sector, but on 1 June its orders were changed as the 60th (2/2nd L) Division moved down to Salonika and embarked for Egypt.

Disembarking at Alexandria, the division completed its concentration at Moascar on 4 July. It was then sent up to the front line in Palestine to join the Egyptian Expeditionary Force (EEF) preparing for the forthcoming Third Battle of Gaza. When the brigades were not in the line during the summer months, they carried out thorough training.

==== Gaza ====
On 31 October, the battalion was with 180th Bde in divisional reserve for the opening Battle of Beersheba, but the initial attack was so successful that the brigade never came into action. It then followed up through the night with 2/17th Londons in the lead. 180th Brigade led 60th (2/2nd L) Division on towards El Muweileh, where it concentrated on the night of 5/6 November for an attack on the Kauwukah trench system (the Battle of Hareira and Sheria). When the assault went in, 2/17th Londons were in brigade reserve. The attack was a success and 180th Bde then pushed on to take the viaduct over the Wadi es Sheria and the water supplies that night. This was delayed because ammunition dumps in the town were exploding and the fires silhouetted the attackers. Lieutenant-Col Dear of the 2/17th agreed with his fellow commanding officers to make the attack when the explosions ended; it went in at 05.30 next morning, the 2/17th charging in silence across the wadi, then rushing four machine guns posted on a mound beyond. The Turks put up a determined resistance, but the position was quickly taken and 180th Bde pushed its line forwards and drove off a counter-attack at 09.30.

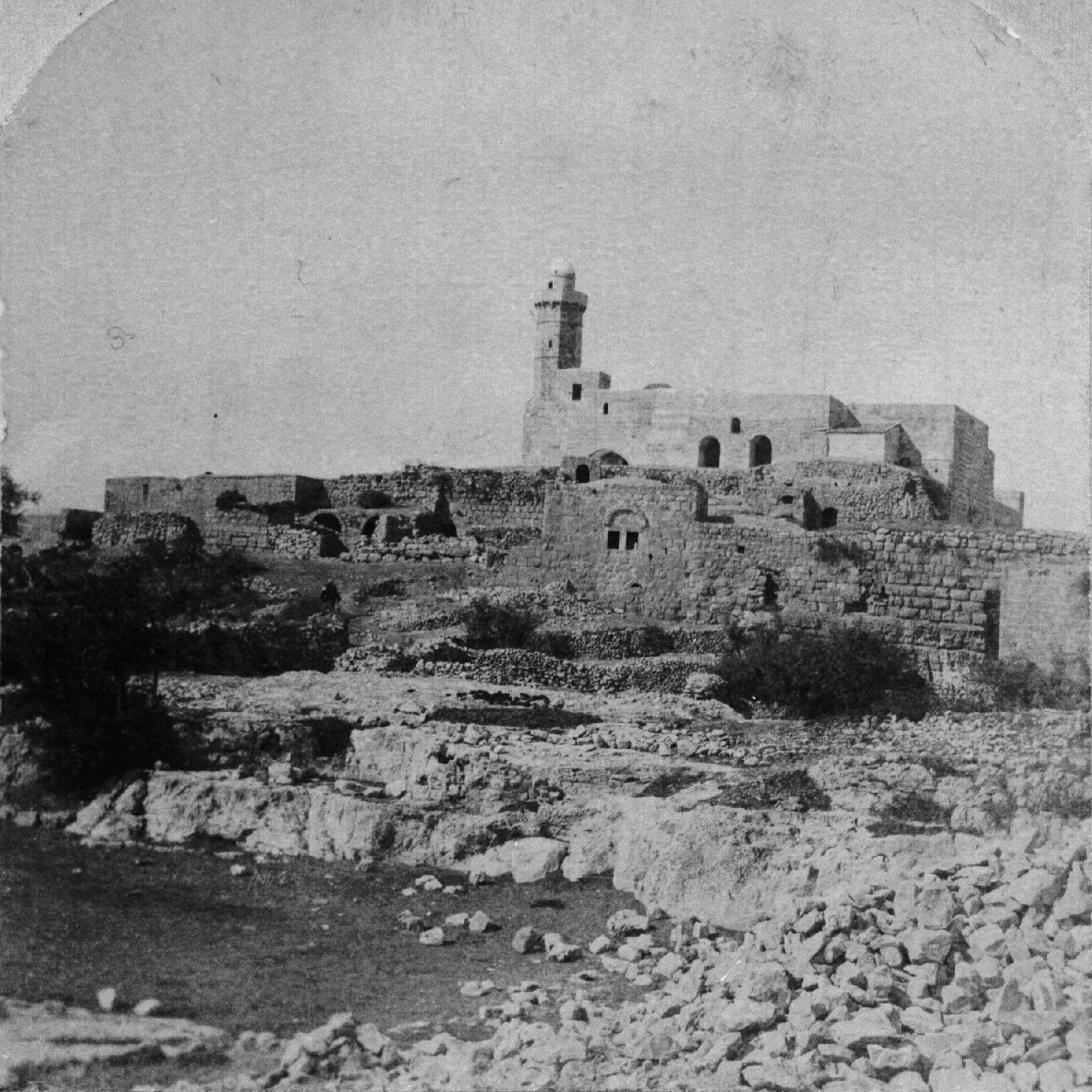
Nebi Samwil mosque before the battle

The pursuit through the Judaean Hills saw the 60th (2/2nd L) Division advancing by separate brigade groups in support of the Desert Mounted Corps, 180th Bde moving with the main body through Zuheilikah. It had a short rest at Huj, then followed the advance of the EEF towards Jerusalem, going into the line at Nebi Samwil on 25 November. This position had been captured after heavy fighting by British and Indian troops. 2/17th Londons were posted in Nebi Samwil itself. On 27 November, the Turks opened a heavy bombardment on the mosque that crowned the hill, which was held by 2/19th Londons. This was followed by wave after wave of attacks, but the garrison, supported by the rest of the brigade, drove them all back. Turkish bombardment of the position continued for several days.

==== Jerusalem ====
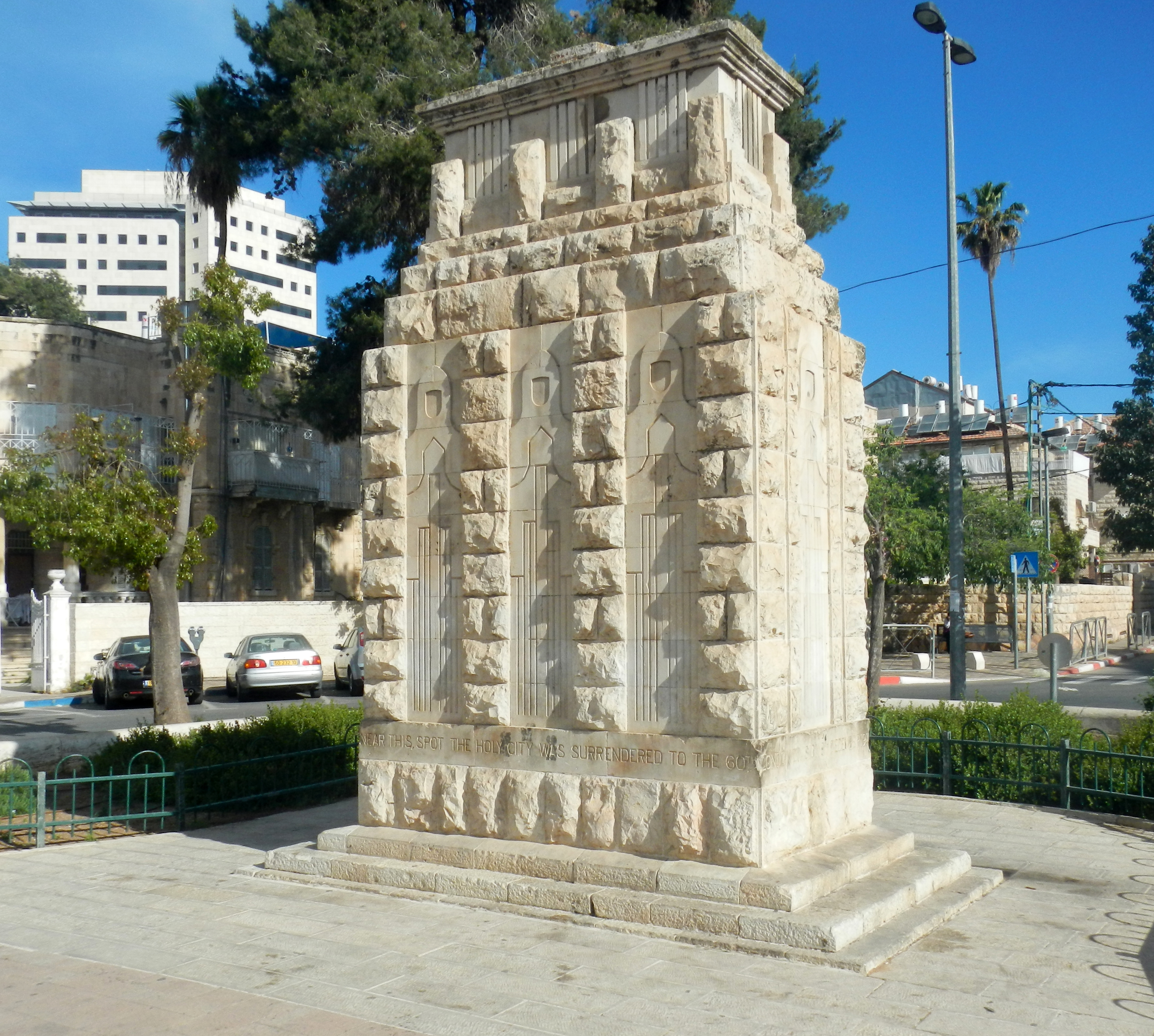
Monument to the surrender of Jerusalem to the 60th London Division.

During the night of 7/8 December, the 60th (2/2nd L) Division concentrated for the attack on Jerusalem. After a difficult approach march, 180th Bde was in position on the Kustal ridge ready to make its assault at 05.15. Advancing in the centre of the brigade through the mist, 2/17th Londons surprised a Turkish outpost and took its first objective by 06.30. The neighbouring 2/19th had been held up, resulting in 2/17th being counter-attacked in flank, but this was beaten off. The battalion's enfilade fire then assisted 2/19th onto its objective. Further advance was held up by machine gun fire from a hill south of Lifta. The Brigadier came forward to confer with Lt-Col Dear and arranged a brigade attack with howitzer support for 15.45, in which two companies of the 2/17th took part. They worked round the left of the Turkish position, which was then carried at the point of the bayonet. The Turks retired hastily into Jerusalem. The division consolidated its position while the artillery struggled up behind. Next morning, it resumed its advance. Approaching Shafat, 180th Bde came under machine gun fire from the flank of 2/17th Londons; the brigade worked round the flank then a company of the 2/17th charged frontally with the bayonet and cleared the position. The following morning, the Turks had retreated. A patrol of 2/19th Londons found Jerusalem abandoned and were offered the keys of the city. On 11 December, General Allenby made a ceremonial entry into Jerusalem, where 180th Bde went into billets.

The Turkish counter-attack down the Nablus road against Jerusalem began on 27 December. This had been expected and 2/17th Londons in Jerusalem were at 10 minutes' notice to march out. When 180th Bde came up from the city to relieve the 179th (2/4th London) Brigade, which had beaten off the initial attacks, it went straight over to the offensive. It had to descend a bare slope and then scale the precipitous hill of Shabb Sala, south of Bire. Having completed this it advanced through the night across rough country. With Jerusalem safe, the EEF ended operations on 30 December.

==== Jordan Valley ====
Apart from constructing defences, the 60th (2/2nd L) Division carried out aggressive patrolling in the early weeks of 1918, with a company of 2/17th Londons carrying out a dawn raid on the village of Mukhmas on 13 January. In February the EEF began preparations for the Capture of Jericho. On 19 February, 60th (2/2nd L) Division was tasked with descending down the Jericho road in brigade columns, with 180th Bde in the centre, 2/17th Londons in brigade reserve. The brigade quickly took the summit of Arak Ibraim, but it took three assaults to capture the next ridge. Meanwhile, 2/17th pushed patrols down the road to secure a line to begin the attack on Talat-ed-Dumm. This was captured next day, and on the morning 21 February the division advanced on its objectives without opposition, the Turks having evacuated Jericho.

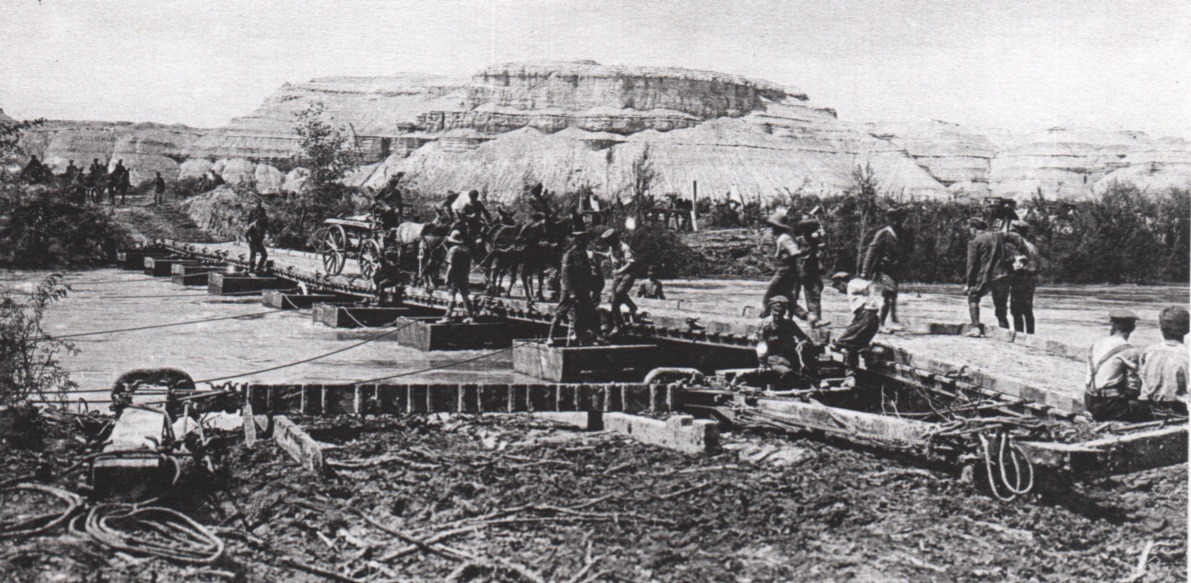
The pontoon bridge across the Jordan

180th Brigade spent early March on the heights above the Jordan Valley. 60th (2/2nd L) Division now formed the infantry portion of "Shea's Group' for the First Trans-Jordan Raid. 2/17th and 2/19th Londons were to make assault crossing at midnight on 21/22 March 1918 (the Battle of Hijla). However, 2/17th's attack at Ghoraniyeh using punts and then swimmers failed, and the only bridgehead was made by 2/19th Bn at Hijla, where they were hauled across on rafts. The Turks opened fire on the rafts at daybreak, but the engineers completed the first pontoon bridge by 08.00. Shea's Force then began its advance towards Amman during the afternoon. At midnight on 22/23 March, 180th Bde, with 2/17th Londons in reserve, attacked the foothills in front and expanded the bridgehead. On 24 March the brigade became the reserve in the bridgehead, covering the pontoon bridge at Ghoraniyeh, while the rest of the division joined the attack on Amman. This began on 28 March but was held up, so 2/17th Londons were ordered up in support. A last attack was made on the Citadel on 30 March, with one company of the 2/17th (the last reserve) sent in to help the 2/18th Londons. This also failed, and with Turkish forces threatening the flanks Shea's Force began withdrawing on 31 March, the infantry covered by 2/17th Londons. This withdrawal was completed by 2 April, leaving the defended bridgehead in place on the east bank of the Jordan.

A Second Trans-Jordan Raid began on the night of 29/30 April. 180th Brigade had concentrated under cover of the riverside jungle the night before, and launched their attack out of the bridgehead at 02.00, a company of 2/17th acting as right flank guard. The attackers reached the foothills by dawn, but ran into serious resistance and were held up. 2/17th Londons attempted to filter reinforcements across the open ground, but few were able to get across. The advanced companies remained pinned down all day until they were relieved by the rest of 2/17th after dark. A second attack was launched on 2 May, with one-and-a-half companies of 2/17th operating on each flank of the brigade. The northern half of the brigade captured the sangars at the top of the ridge, but was then driven off. The southern half was held up before reaching the crest and a number of men were captured when the Turks worked round its flank. The raid was called off next day. By 4 May, the whole of 60th (2/2nd L) Division had been withdrawn west of the Jordan. It then went into Corps Reserve near Jerusalem.

==== Western Front ====
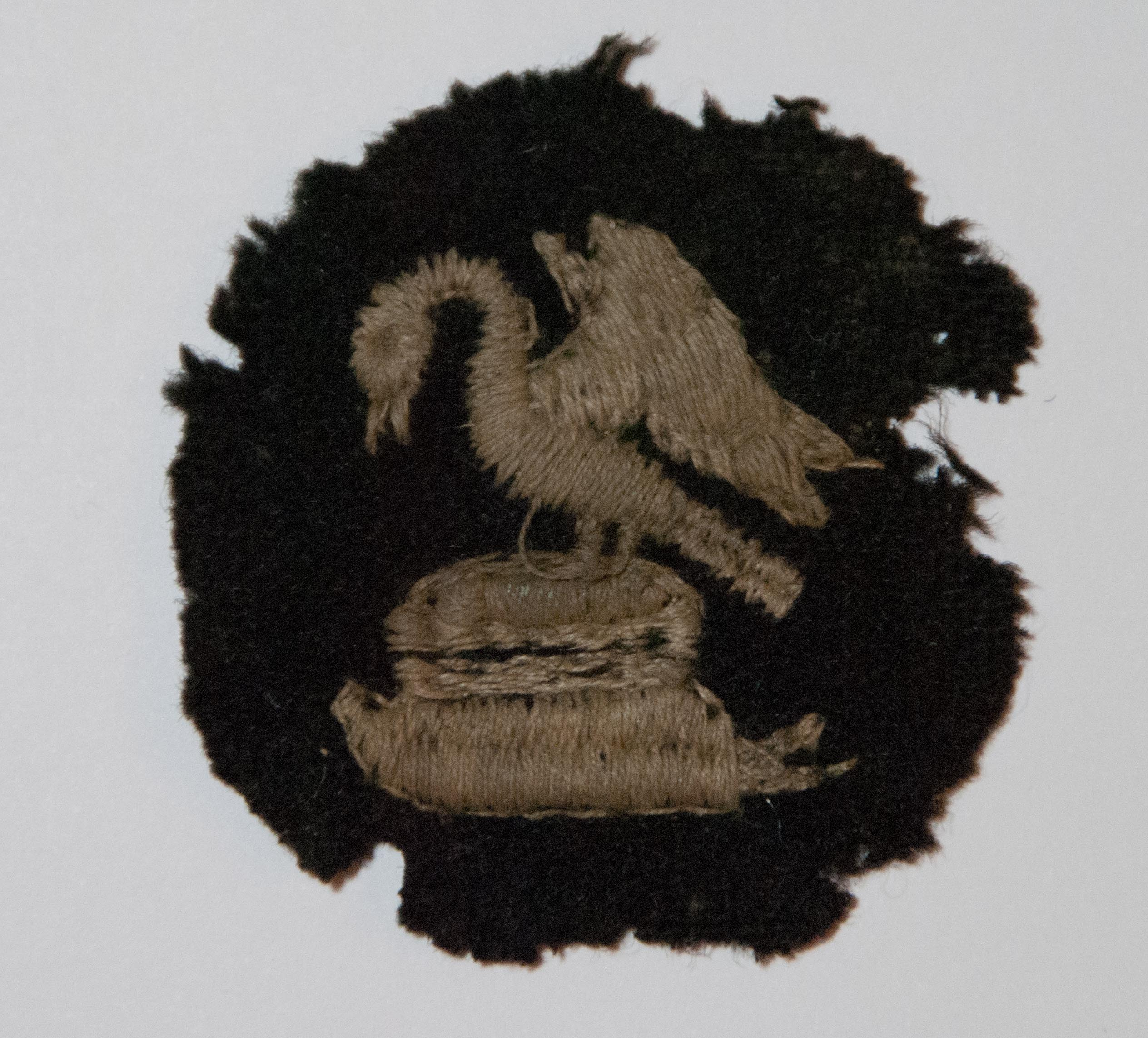
The Earl of Derby's crest, worn as a formation sign by 30th Division.

Following the BEF's losses during the German Spring Offensive of March 1918, the EEF was obliged to send reinforcements to the Western Front. Most of 60th (2/2nd L) Division's infantry battalions were sent, the 2/17th Londons travelling via Taranto in Italy on 22 June. On 30 June, at Ouest Mont, near Éperlecques, it joined 89th Brigade in 30th Division, which was being reformed mainly with units from Palestine.

30th Division was assigned to Second Army on the Flanders front. By the time the reformed division was ready for action the Final Allied Advance had begun, and Second Army was cautiously following a deliberate German retirement. On 1 September 89th Bde carried out a small operation by itself to capture Neuve Eglise. Second Army began a major offensive (the Fifth Battle of Ypres) on 28 September. 30th Division was ordered to watch for opportunities, and it sent patrols forward. At 16.40, it was ordered to advance and complete the capture of that day's third objective. The brigades attacked at 18.30 and gained a little ground, slowed up more by broken terrain and oncoming darkness than by enemy opposition. Starting early next morning, 89th Bde cleared the Messines–Wytschaete Ridge, and made rapid progress towards the Comines Canal, which it reached easily.

89th Brigade was in reserve when 30th Division attacked again at the Battle of Courtrai on 14 October. The division pushed patrols forward to the River Lys on 15 October and crossed next day. It continued its advance over the following days, using small advance guards with 89th Bde further back in support. On 21 October, patrols from the brigade took over the lead as the division approached the River Schelde and occupied its west bank.

Second Army prepared an assault crossing of the Schelde timed for 11 November, but the enemy began withdrawing on 8 November and next day 89th Bde forced a crossing of the river at Avelgem. It advanced rapidly through Ansercoeuil to reach Renaix that night. The line was pushed forwards next day, and the division occupied Ellezelles, confronting the German rearguards at Flobecq, east of Renaix. On the morning of 11 November, the 7th Dragoon Guards passed through the infantry, and advanced rapidly with the leading infantry of 89th Bde to reach a line from Ghoy to La Livarde, north west of Lessines when the Armistice came into force at 11.00.

Afterwards, 30th Division moved back to the west and by 4 December was billeted in Renescure until the end of the month when its units moved to the base ports of Dunkirk, Calais, Boulogne and Étaples for duties there. In February, demobilisation began.

The 2/17th Londons were disbanded in France on 20 October 1919.

=== 3/17th Londons ===
The 3rd line battalion was formed on 10 March 1915 and camped at Richmond Park for training. It went into billets for the winter;n in January 1916, it moved with the other London training battalions to Winchester, where it was redesignated 17th (Reserve) Bn on 8 April. It joined the 2nd London Reserve Brigade on 1 September (Note: Some sources suggest that the battalion was disbanded at Camberwell on 1 September 1916, but others have it continuing until the Armistice.) but in December 1917 it moved to Wimbledon to join a new 3rd London Reserve Brigade. At the time of the Armistice, the 17th (Res) Bn was at Orpington in Kent.

=== 31st Londons ===
The remaining Home Service men of the TF were separated when the 3rd Line battalions were raised in May 1915, and were formed into Provisional Battalions for home defence. The men of the 17th Londons joined with those from the 18th (London Irish) and 21st (First Surrey Rifles) Battalions of the London Regiment to form 107th Provisional Battalion (Territorial Force) at Frinton-on-Sea in Essex. It joined 7th Provisional Brigade in the defences of East Anglia.

The Military Service Act 1916 swept away the Home/Foreign service distinction, and all TF soldiers became liable for overseas service, if medically fit. The Provisional Brigades thus became anomalous, and their units became numbered battalions of their parent units. On 1 January 1917, 107th Provisional Bn absorbed 105th Provisional Bn (the former home service men of the 11th (Finsbury Rifles), 13th (Kensington), 15th (London Scottish) and 16th (Queen's Westminsters) Bns, London Regiment) to become 31st (County of London) Battalion, London Regiment, in 226th Mixed Bde, attached to 71st Division from 13 April 1917. By May 1917, the battalion was at St Osyth in Essex. Part of the role of the former provisional units was physical conditioning to render men fit for drafting overseas, and as men were drafted the 31st Londons was run down, and it was disbanded on 7 September 1917.

== Interwar period ==
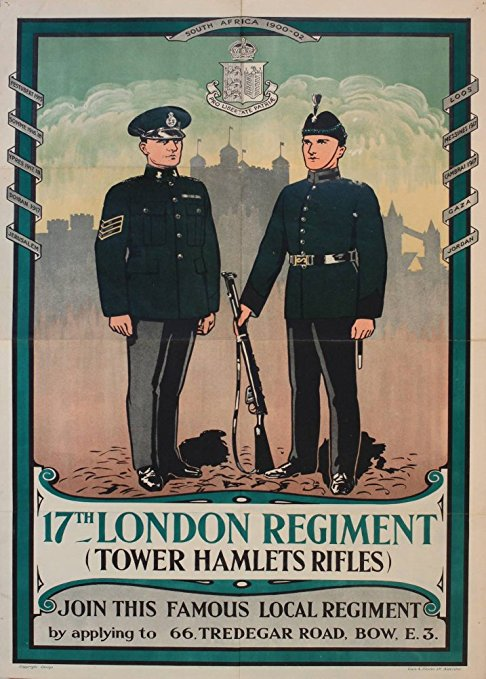
Recruitment poster ca 1930.

The TF was reconstituted on 7 February 1920, and was reorganised as the Territorial Army (TA) the following year. The London Regiment having been abolished on 7 July 1916, its battalions transferred back to their pre-1908 affiliations – the Rifle Brigade in the case of the 17th. In 1922, it was redesignated the 17th London Regiment (Poplar and Stepney Rifles); on 31 December 1926, this was changed to 17th London Regiment (Tower Hamlets Rifles). Once again the battalion was in 141st (5th London) Bde in 47th (2nd London) Division.

However, in view of the increasing threat of air attack in the event of another European war and the need to increase anti-aircraft (AA) defences, 47th Divisional HQ was converted into 1st Anti-Aircraft Division HQ on 15 December 1935, and many of its infantry battalions were converted to AA roles. However, 17th Londons remained as infantry, and on 10 August 1937 was redesignated as the Tower Hamlets Rifles, The Rifle Brigade (Prince Consort's Own).

After the Munich Crisis, the TA was doubled in size in early 1939, most units forming duplicates of themselves. The Tower Hamlets Rifles (THR) was formally designated as the 1st Battalion on 31 March 1939, and the first officers were commissioned into the 2nd Bn on 3 July 1939.

== World War II ==
=== Mobilisation ===
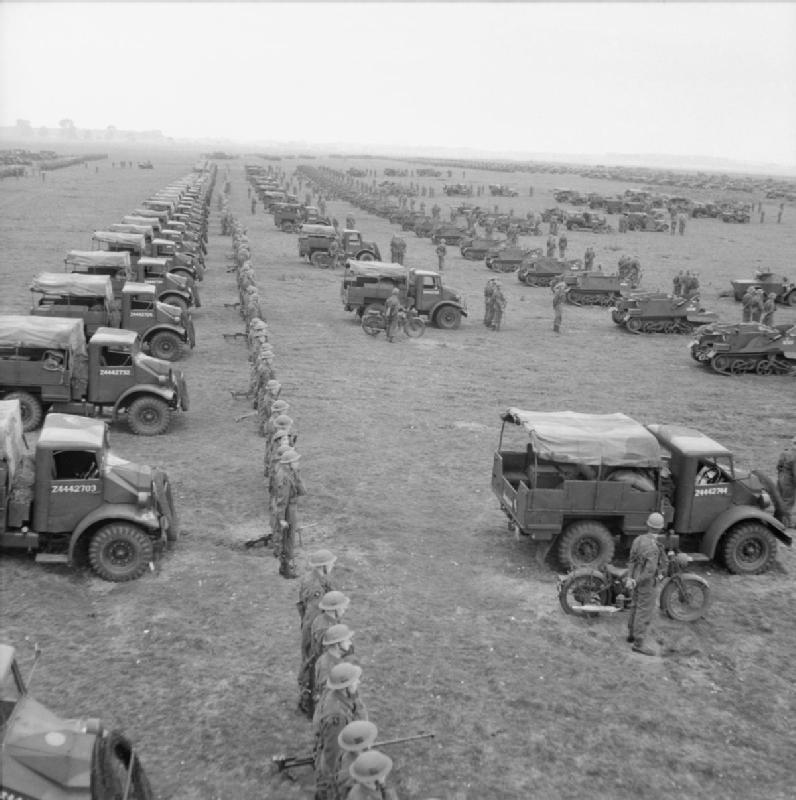
A motor battalion of 6th Armoured Division on parade with Universal carriers and Morris CS8 15-hundredweight trucks in the UK, 12 September 1941.

The TA was mobilised on 1 September 1939 and war was declared on 3 September. Both THR battalions mobilised in 3rd London Infantry Brigade, which was temporarily in 1st London Division until the new duplicate 2nd London Division was formed in October.

During World War II, the 'Greenjackets' (the King's Royal Rifle Corps (KRRC) and the Rifle Brigade, including their affiliated TA battalions) specialised in providing motorised infantry battalions to armoured brigades and armoured division support groups. Both of the THR battalions were converted into motor battalions in 1940.

The 3rd Bn, London Rifle Brigade (LRB), another TA regiment affiliated to the Rifle Brigade, was formed on 4 July 1940, but a week later it was redesignated 3rd Bn, Tower Hamlets Rifles.

=== 1st Tower Hamlets Rifles ===
On 1 March 1940, 1st Bn THR was assigned to 2nd Support Group forming in 2nd Armoured Division. The division served in home defence until after the German defeat in the Battle of Britain, when it became possible to send reinforcements to Middle East Forces for operations against the Italian Army. It arrived in Egypt on 31 December 1940.

On 15 January 1941, the 1st and 2nd THR were redesignated the 9th and 10th Battalions, Rifle Brigade (Tower Hamlets Rifles) (9th and 10th RB). (Note: Not to be confused with the 9th and 10th (Service) Bns, Rifle Brigade, formed in 'Kitchener's Army' in World War I.)

After desert training, 9th RB was attached to 3rd Armoured Brigade and sent up to Mersa Brega. The battalion's first motorised patrol identified the Afrika Korps opposite, and when the German offensive (Operation Sonnenblume) began on 31 March, 9th RB was heavily engaged. Afterwards, the part of the battalion that still had transport joined a mobile column, while the dismounted part served in the garrison of Tobruk during the early part of the Siege. The battalion was then reunited in the Nile Delta to refit.

When the British Eighth Army began its winter offensive (Operation Crusader) in November 1941, 9th RB was with 22nd Guards Bde in reserve, guarding supply dumps. As the fighting seemed to be going well, 9th RB was sent with a field artillery battery to engage the enemy on the edge of the main battle. It was in action against scattered enemy forces on 22 November when the Germans broke through and began moving rapidly towards the frontier and Eighth Army's rear areas. 9th Rifle Brigade raced back parallel to the German columns, and took part with 22nd Guards Bde in the counter-attack at Bir el Gubi.

By early December, Eighth Army had regained the initiative. 9th Rifle Brigade was attached to 4th Armoured Bde, then on 28 December it joined 22nd Armoured Bde for an attack near Haseiat, during which one of its companies was overrun. It then served in mobile columns patrolling the desert until it was relieved. However, on 21 January, the Axis forces broke through again and 9th RB's rest camp was back in the front line. The battalion was divided among three columns formed in the camp, which fought their way back to the Gazala Line defences.

When the fighting resumed in May (the Battle of Gazala), 9th RB was drawn into the Battle of the Cauldron. During the subsequent retreat, 9th RB took part in several rearguard actions before reaching the El Alamein position. Over the following weeks, the battalion was in constant motion, being used to plug gaps in the line during the First Battle of El Alamein. By early August, 9th RB was refitting in the Delta area when a decision was made to break it up to provide reinforcements for the other RB battalions in the theatre. The battalion was reduced to a cadre, and on 22 December 1942 was deemed to have passed into 'suspended animation'.

9th Rifle Brigade was reformed on 20 February 1944 by amalgamating the cadre with 2nd Motor Training Bn, Rifle Brigade. This was converted into 86 Primary Training Wing on 20 March 1944 and passed into suspended animation once more when the personnel were transferred to 27th Greenjackets Holding Bn on 29 November 1945.

=== 2nd Tower Hamlets Rifles ===
The 2nd Bn THR was assigned to 26th Armoured Bde when that was formed on 16 October 1940. It became 10th Bn Rifle Brigade (Tower Hamlets Rifles) (10th RB) on 15 January 1941.

26th Armoured Bde with 10th Rifle Brigade commanded by Lt-Col Adrian Gore landed in North Africa as part of Operation Torch in November 1942 and fought through the Tunisian campaign with 6th Armoured Division. The division was held back from the Italian campaign until March 1944, but after the Fourth Battle of Monte Cassino in May the division was reorganised and 10th RB left 26th Armoured Bde to join 61st Infantry Bde. This comprised 2nd, 7th (LRB) and 10th (THR) Bns of the Rifle Brigade, all motor battalions, under Brig Adrian Gore. It fought in the battles of the Gothic Line and the winter actions in the Apennines.

However, by Spring 1945, the Allied forces in Italy were suffering a manpower crisis and a number of units were broken up to provide reinforcements for others. 10th Rifle Brigade passed into suspended animation on 20 March 1945, when the remaining personnel were transferred to the 2nd and 7th RB.

=== 3rd Tower Hamlets Rifles ===
3rd Battalion THR was assigned to 5th Infantry Division on 15 January 1941. On 22 January 1942, it was converted into the divisional reconnaissance unit as 5th Bn, Reconnaissance Corps, later 5th Reconnaissance Regiment, Royal Armoured Corps. It sailed with the division to India in March 1942 and then served in Persia and Iraq Command before travelling via Syria and Palestine to Egypt. It took part in the Allied invasion of Sicily and the Italian Campaign. The division rested for a few months back in Egypt and Palestine before returning to Italy. At the beginning of 1945, it was sent to North West Europe for the final months of the war in Germany.

== Postwar ==
When the TA was reconstituted on 1 January 1947, the 9th and 10th Bns were reformed at Tredegar Road and combined as 656 (Tower Hamlets) Light Anti-Aircraft Regiment, Royal Artillery The regiment formed part of 97 Army Group Royal Artillery (Anti-Aircraft), which was disbanded on 5 December 1950.

When Anti-Aircraft Command was abolished on 10 March 1955, there were wholesale mergers amongst AA units, and 656 LAA Rgt was merged with 512 (Finsbury Rifles) LAA and 568 (St Pancras) (Mixed) LAA/Searchlight Rgts to form 512 LAA Rgt, to which 656 LAA Rgt contributed R (Tower Hamlets) Battery.

There were further reductions in the TA in 1961, and on 1 May 512 LAA Rgt merged with 459 (Essex Regiment) Heavy AA and part of 517 (Essex) LAA Rgts to form 300 LAA Rgt, which included R (Tower Hamlets) Bty. On 1 January 1965, the regiment was redesignated 300 (Tower Hamlets) Light Air Defence Rgt. The new unit was based at 405 Mile End Road, London E3, the Tredegar Road drill hall being demolished during the 1960s.

When the TA was reduced into the Territorial and Army Volunteer Reserve (TAVR) in 1967, the regiment provided RHQ and R Bty, in the Greater London Regiment, RA (T), which had the following organisation.

- RHQ, London E3– from 300 (TH) LAD Rgt
- C Bty, Honourable Artillery Company (Royal Horse Artillery) – from 1 Field Rgt, HAC, RHA
- HAC Infantry Company – from HAC Infantry Bn
- R (Tower Hamlets) Bty – from 300 (TH) LAD Rgt
- S (City of London) Bty – from 254 (CoL) Field Rgt

The regiment was broken up again on 1 January 1969. C Battery and the HAC Infantry Company (known in the HAC as the Light Company) were absorbed back into the HAC. Some men from R (TH) Bty were absorbed into 39 (Skinners) Signal Rgt, 151 Rgt Royal Corps of Transport, and 217 General Hospital, Royal Army Medical Corps. The rest of the regiment was reduced to a cadre, which was expanded on 1 April 1971 to become B (Greater London Royal Artillery) Bty in 6th (Volunteer) Bn, Queen's Regiment, and the Tower Hamlets lineage was ended.

== Heritage & ceremonial ==
=== Uniforms & insignia ===
The uniform of the 26th Middlesex RVC was Rifle green with scarlet facings (similar to the 60th Rifles), that of the 2nd Tower Hamlets RVC was 'Volunteer' grey with scarlet facings. Both units retained these uniforms after they became VBs of the Rifle Brigade. The Rifle Brigade's Rifle green uniform with black facings was only adopted after the battalions merged to form the 17th Londons. As a rifle regiment it wore black buttons on its khaki service dress.

=== Honorary Colonels ===
The following served as Honorary Colonel of the battalion and its predecessors:

- George Phipps, 2nd Marquess of Normanby, appointed to 1st Tower Hamlets Admin Bn 23 December 1863
- Field Marshal Sir Hugh Rose (later Lord Strathnairn) appointed to 26th Middlesex RVC 3 July 1865, died 16 October 1885
- Col Sir Fowell Buxton, 3rd Baronet, VD, founding CO, appointed to 2nd Tower Hamlets RVC, 9 February 1884 until 1903
- Col Edmund Hegan Kennard, former CO, appointed to 15th Middlesex RVC, 16 December 1885
- Col W.B. Bryan, VD, former CO, appointed to 2nd Tower Hamlets 27 June 1903; continued with 17th Londons
- Col A.W. Changers, VD, former CO, appointed 25 March 1915
- J. Golding, OBE, TD, appointed 22 September 1921
- Col Evan Morgan, 2nd Viscount Tredegar, appointed 7 June 1930
- Maj-Gen Arthur Edwin Tremlett, CB, appointed 27 June 1947
- Col A.J. Page, CB, TD

=== Battle Honours ===
The battalion was awarded the following battle honours (those in bold were emblazoned on the colours):

- Second Boer War:

South Africa, 1900–02

- First World War:

Aubers, Festubert, 1915, Loos, Somme 1916, '18, Flers–Courcelette, Morval, Le Transloy, Messines 1917, Ypres, 1917, '18, Langemarck, 1917, Cambrai, 1917, St Quentin, Bapaume, 1918, Ancre, 1918, Albert, 1918, Coirtrai, France and Falnders, 1915–18, Doiran, 1917, Macedonia, 1916–17, Gaza, El Mughar, Nebi Samwill, Jerusalem, Jericho, Jordan, Tell 'Asur, Palestine, 1917–18

- Second World War:

Mersa el Brega, Agedabia, Derna Aerodrome, Tobruk, 1940, Chor es Sufan, Saunnu, Gazala, Defence of Alamein Line, Medjez el Bab, Kasserine, Thala, Fondouk, Fondouk Pass, El Kourzia, Tunis, Hammam Lif, North Africa 1941–43, Cassino II, Liri Valley, Melfa Crossing, Monte Rotondo, Capture of Perugia, Arezzo, Advance to Florence, Tossignano, Italy 1944–45.

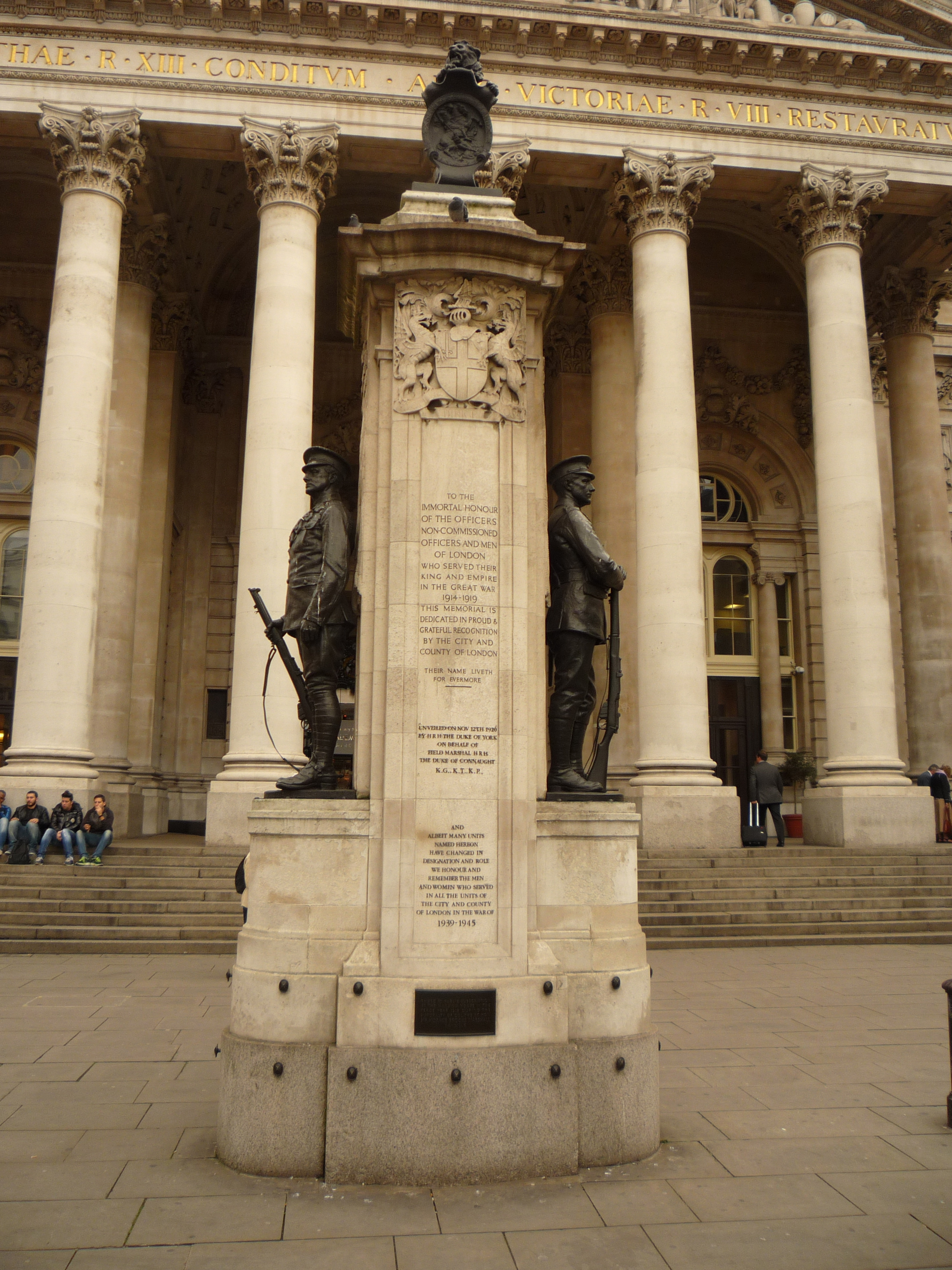
London Troops Memorial at the Royal Exchange

=== Memorials ===
There is a plaque to the foundation of the battalion on a building in Wapping Wall, next to Shadwell Basin Bridge (see photo).

The 17th Bn London Regiment is listed on the City and County of London Troops Memorial in front of the Royal Exchange, with architectural design by Sir Aston Webb and sculpture by Alfred Drury. The right-hand (southern) bronze figure flanking this memorial depicts an infantryman representative of the various London infantry units.

The battalion's own World War I memorial is now located in an Army Reserve Centre at 405 Mile End Road, Bow.
