= Dixon of Dock Green =

British police procedural TV series (1955–1976)

- Jack Warner as Constable George Dixon
- Created by: Ted Willis
- Starring: Jack Warner
- Country of origin: United Kingdom
- Original language: English
- No. of series: 22
- No. of episodes: 432 (399 missing) (list of episodes)

Production
- Running time: 30 minutes & 50 minutes

Original release
- Network: BBC Television Service/BBC1
- Release: 9 July 1955 – 1 May 1976

Dixon of Dock Green is a BBC police procedural television series about daily life at a fictional London police station, with the emphasis on petty crime, successfully controlled through common sense and human understanding. It ran from 1955 to 1976. The central character, George Dixon, first appeared in the film The Blue Lamp (1950). Dixon is a mature and sympathetic police constable, who was played by Jack Warner in all of the 432 episodes.

Dixon is the supposed embodiment of a typical "bobby" who would be familiar with the area in which he patrolled and its residents and often lived there himself. The series contrasted with later programmes such as Z-Cars, which more realistically reflected a more aggressive policing culture. It retained a faithful following throughout its run and was voted second-most popular programme on British television in 1961.

== Character and name origins ==
The character of Police Constable George Dixon was based on an old-style British "bobby" – a slang term for policeman. Dixon first appeared in the Ealing Studios film The Blue Lamp (1950) as a typical bobby on the beat, an experienced constable working out of the Paddington Green police station and nearing retirement. The film was produced by Michael Balcon, who had been educated at George Dixon School in Birmingham, named after a local politician: this inspired the character name.

In The Blue Lamp, Dixon has a wife named Em (Gladys Henson). It is mentioned that their only son, Bert, was killed in the Second World War – hence Dixon adopts a paternal aspect towards PC Andy Mitchell (Jimmy Hanley), a young policeman on his first day. Dixon comes across a raid and is shot. The rest of the film focuses on catching the perpetrator, a thug named Tom Riley (played by Dirk Bogarde). This gears up hugely once Dixon, who was said to be rallying in hospital, unexpectedly and suddenly dies, and Mitchell embarks on a perilous quest to find Tom Riley and bring him to justice.

== Series conception ==
In 1955, the BBC Television Service was preparing to face competition from the forthcoming launch of the Independent Television network of commercial TV companies. The BBC therefore resurrected George Dixon for a new series featuring "everyday stories of a London policeman". The series came with an already familiar hero, played (as in the film) by a much-loved entertainer. The image of Jack Warner in police uniform with helmet made for an effective symbol of policing in Britain.

Despite being a drama, the series was produced in its early years by the BBC's light entertainment department. It was originally produced at the BBC's Riverside and Lime Grove studios. Episodes in series 1 to 7 ran to 30 minutes. From series 3 to 7 each series' final episode was extended to 45 minutes. From series 8 (1961) onwards all episodes were 45, then 50, minutes in duration.

== Early series ==
There were some changes made before the first series aired. Paddington Green police station became the fictitious Dock Green police station in the East End of London. The character of PC Andy Mitchell became raw new constable PC Andy Crawford (Peter Byrne). According to the first series episode "Needle in a Haystack" Dixon is a widower, his wife having died in an air raid during the Second World War, though they had an only daughter, Mary (played by Billie Whitelaw in early episodes, later replaced by Jeanette Hutchinson and Anna Dawson). They lived in a small mid-terrace house on a busy road. Dixon would remain basically the same character as in the film; he could be relied on to be friendly with a lot of heart, a cornerstone of which was his honesty with which you knew he would be absolutely dependable and cool in a crisis. The actor's age meant Dixon was always an older bobby and the viewer was left to wonder why promotion hadn't come his way earlier.

Dixon's mentoring of Crawford was seen from Dixon of Dock Green's first series opener, "PC Crawford's first Pinch", broadcast on Saturday 9 July 1955. Dixon was portrayed as having a paternal and steadying influence on his colleagues and episodes often highlighted the family-like nature of life in the station as well as Dixon's actual family life at home. With his experience as a police constable frequently in evidence, he was often shown as being able to solve crimes and to keep the peace using his knowledge of human behaviour and of the Dock Green area. The initial run of six episodes ended on 13 August with the "London Pride" segment and was deemed a success; a further series of 13 episodes was commissioned to start broadcasting on 9 June 1956. Plots often focused on the role of the police in dealing with low-level, community-based crimes.

The last five episodes from series two are the earliest episodes of Dixon known to exist. One of those is "The Rotten Apple" (broadcast 11 August 1956), a story which illustrates Dixon's belief in the honour of wearing the police uniform. A young constable, Tom Carr (Paul Eddington) appears to be enjoying a lifestyle that was more lavish than would be expected on his salary. His life begins to unravel after Dixon gets a visit from a local (legal) horse bookmaker, Maurie Weitzman (Harry Ross), to whom Carr owes a lot of money: Weitzman needs it back but knows Carr will lose his job if he makes his complaint official. With the force's reputation at stake, Dixon visits a nervous Carr in his flat changing into his uniform. Carr agrees to settle the debt, but as Dixon prepares to leave, accidentally knocks over a box, sending silverware clattering across the floor. The items, it transpires, are stolen, and the proceeds of a series of mysterious burglaries in the area. Dixon is affronted by this betrayal of trust, and orders the disgraced Carr to remove his uniform before he will escort him through the streets to Dock Green Station.

Series two ended on 1 September 1956 with the episode "Father-in-Law". Dixon is the father-in-law of the title, with Andy Crawford marrying his 23-year-old daughter, Mary. Dixon gets to sing a few songs at the wedding, but a small matter of a missing wallet emerges. At the end of the episode, with the mystery solved, Dixon wishes the viewers goodbye while the happy couple go off, to move to a flat in Chelmsford. An indicator of the series' success is that the start of series three was a mere four months away.

In the early days, a subtitle declared the series to be "Some Stories of a London Policeman", with each episode starting with Dixon speaking directly to the camera (breaking the "fourth wall"). He begins with a salute and the greeting "Good evening all", which was changed to "Evening all" in the early 1970s, which has lived on in Britain as a jocular greeting. In similar fashion, episodes finished with a few words to camera from Dixon in the form of philosophy on the evils of crime, before saluting and wishing the viewers "Goodnight, all". Some felt Dixon to be a real person; at the end of a series, he would tell the audience that he was "going on holiday for a few weeks" so they shouldn't worry about not seeing him around.

As Ted Willis noted, in bringing Dixon to the small screen, he sought to portray "an ordinary, working-class policeman on the beat" with focus more on people, with the tendency to "concentrate on the smaller everyday type of crime, and put the emphasis on people rather than problems." Willis talked in 1957 about seeking "to break away from the accepted formula for police and crime stories [...] The average policeman might go through a life-time of service without being involved in one murder case. His life is one of routine [...] Would [viewers] take simple, human stories about a simple ordinary copper and the people he meets?" Change for the central character was slow, and it took until the opening episode of series 11 before George Dixon earned his stripes and was promoted to sergeant in "Facing the Music" (S11, E01, 19 September 1964).

== Later series ==
The series evolved, though slowly, Ted Willis ensuring that the familiarity of the format remained its greatest strength for many years. The procedural detail formed a backbone on top of which the dramatic story played out, allowing the whole to make perfect sense. Often delivered at a genteel pace, this approach led to criticism from some quarters in the face of faster-paced (and sometimes more violent) contemporaries such as The Sweeney and even Z-Cars. Overall, the show ran for 22 series. Fans continued their support for the character with each new series. When Dixon was shot in one episode, the BBC received 4,000 letters of anxious inquiry and had it announced on television that Jack was all right. Other characters were not forgotten; indeed, PC Andy Crawford – as well as being the main character's son-in-law – would go on to rise through the ranks and be promoted to Detective Inspector during Season 20.

Dixon of Dock Green is sometimes unfavourably compared with later police procedural series (such as Z-Cars in the 1960s, The Sweeney in the 1970s and The Bill in the 1980s) which were seen as having a higher degree of realism due to their harder-hitting and more dynamic nature. However, the style of the programme did evolve over time, and some of the 1970s episodes which have been preserved demonstrate little of the homely nature for which the show was often criticised. Plot lines in this period included the suspected suicide of a police officer, a gangland killing, and the shooting of a suspect by police officers using firearms. Police in the UK do not routinely carry firearms, and in the 1970s guns were rarely ever seen in their hands.

"Firearms Were Issued" (20 April 1974, one of the surviving episodes) examines that last point. A notorious gang of bank robbers has performed a raid locally, and Dock Green police are tipped off "from a reliable source" that they have retreated into a suburban house on their patch. Taking no chances, the go-ahead for a raid is given, and Sergeant George Dixon issues firearms to D.I. Andy Crawford and his team. With the gang attempting to flee under cover of darkness, shots are fired, including two from Crawford. At least one of these apparently hits and kills the target in the dark, the truth of which only comes to light later during the investigation that is quickly launched back at Dock Green police station. All officers are quizzed and re-quizzed by a senior external CID officer, going over the rights and wrongs of each step, looking for accountability. Everyone involved is left in no doubt as to the consequences of their actions, should they prove to be truthfully theirs. In retrospect, the process can be seen as primitive compared to the in-depth procedural investigations of the 21st century, but was rarely touched on in contemporary productions. The detail ensured that neither characters nor viewers could be completely sure about the outcome, ensuring gripping television drama.

By the final years of the series in the 1970s, Warner was in his late seventies and looking increasingly implausible in uniform, mandatory retirement age being 55. This led to the formerly supportive police no longer regarding the character as a credible advertisement for the force. Warner had increasing difficulty moving about, which was helped slightly by a treatment involving bee stings. When it became known that the 1976 series of eight episodes would be the last, some changes saw familiar faces including long-standing and popular cast member Peter Byrne leave, bringing in some new blood. The final series was shown in 1976 when Warner was 80 and the producers saw the opportunity to make some changes to the format. George Dixon was shown as retired from the police and being re-employed as a civilian as the collator, a temporary appointment which allowed him to train up whoever would be the next permanent collator. The introductory monologue and winding-up speech continued to be delivered by George Dixon, now out of uniform and behind his collator's desk. There was an increase in action whilst retaining detailed storytelling with Dixon's values at the core.

The last series of eight episodes ended on Saturday 1 May 1976 with "Reunion". Lord Willis said, "I knew it had to come to an end sometime and I thought something was in the wind. They usually renew my Dock Green contract in February and it hasn't been renewed this time". There were thoughts about continuing with the current cast using the revamped format, though any continuation would have been under a different title. Any ideas and plans were never seriously followed up and after 21 years of Dixon of Dock Green, with its lead character out of the picture, the series came to a natural end.

== Reception ==
=== Jack Warner ===
Warner's success as Dixon was well received by police forces. He was made an honorary member of both the Margate and Ramsgate police forces in the 1950s. Warner said of Dixon of Dock Green in 1976: "It has been a very good meal ticket for twenty-one years - although the taxman has never been far behind." In his autobiography, Jack of All Trades, Warner tells of a visit by Queen Elizabeth II to the studios where the series was made, where she commented "that she thought Dixon of Dock Green had become part of the British way of life".

The regard in which Warner's portrayal of a fictional policeman was held was seen at the actor's funeral at Margate Crematorium on 1 June 1981. Six Margate constables stood as guards-of-honour outside the chapel while delegations of officers attended (some coming from Wales and Newcastle upon Tyne), including 16 from the Metropolitan Police, led by Deputy Assistant Commissioner George Rushbrook and Commander John Atkins.

=== Criticism ===
Over the two decades-plus that Dixon was broadcast, it came in for increasing criticism, especially in its later years. The Guinness Book of Classic Television described the programme as "an anachronism by the time it ended and a dangerous one at that". Ted Willis summarised the changing critical reception for Dixon in an article published in the TV Times in 1983: "In the first years, the critics were almost unanimous in their acclaim for Dock Green, hailing it as a breakthrough, praising its realism. But slowly, the view began to change. We were accused of being too cosy and the good word was reserved for series like No Hiding Place, Z-Cars and Softly, Softly. These, in turn, were superseded by the violent, all-action type of police drama like The Sweeney." He also stated that: "Eighty per cent of police work is ordinary and unsensational."

Willis made some further observations. He found that, in fact and fiction, characters akin to Jack Regan in The Sweeney were to be underplayed by the police who sought to restore their place in modern communities. The surviving episodes (with an emphasis on the latter years of the programme) which saw DVD releases allowed Dixon to be seen less deserving of its reputation as a "cosy" stereotype, and more as a programme that tells the stories honestly and entertainingly. Willis noted that it would be harder for the police to build relationships with the public if they were continually to go around beating up every suspect.

Indeed, Alan Plater, who was a writer for Z-Cars early in his career, argued in 1976 (published in the police publication Context); "It is just as irresponsible to portray the police as always chasing murderers and big-time criminals as it is to show them as boy scouts like George Dixon. The Sweeney is ridiculous. It's James Cagney and the Sundance Kid rolled into one and given a British background."

== Locations ==
The police station featured in the original opening titles was the old Ealing police station, at 5 High Street, just north of Ealing Green.

The opening and closing moments of each episode originally had PC Dixon delivering the famous lines "Evening, all" and "Good night, all", and a suitably moral homily, from outside Dock Green police station. However, most of these sequences were not filmed at Ealing police station - then still operational - but on the front steps of the (1902) Ealing Grammar School for Boys on Ealing Green. The BBC would attach a blue lamp next to the double doors, and the front oak-floored vestibule of the old school would warmly glow behind. During later series Dixon addressed the audience standing in front of a painted backdrop of a London skyline.

The 1973 episode "Eye Witness" shows a shot of a derelict warehouse complex with a sign identifying it as part of the Metropolitan & New Crane Wharves; these are located in Wapping Wall. This episode also shows the bascule bridge across the entrance to Shadwell Basin in Wapping. The warehouse is long gone; a supermarket now occupies the site.

At the end of the 1975 episode "Conspiracy", the exterior of Dock Green police station is represented by the Metropolitan Police's then recently built Chiswick police station, on Chiswick High Road in west London.

== Broadcast dates ==
(1955–1976, 22 series, 432 episodes)

Series	From	To	Episode count
1	9 July 1955	13 August 1955	6
2	9 June 1956	September 1956	13
3	12 January 1957	30 March 1957	12
4	7 September 1957	29 March 1958	29
5	27 September 1958	28 March 1959	27
6	12 September 1959	2 April 1960	30
7	1 October 1960	22 April 1961	30
8	9 September 1961	3 March 1962	26
9	15 September 1962	23 March 1963	28
10	5 October 1963	28 March 1964	26
11	19 September 1964	13 March 1965	26
12	2 October 1965	30 April 1966	31
13	1 October 1966	24 December 1966	13
14	30 September 1967	10 February 1968	20
15	7 September 1968	21 December 1968	16
16	6 September 1969	27 December 1969	17
17	14 November 1970	6 March 1971	17
18	20 November 1971	12 February 1972	13
19	23 September 1972	30 December 1972	14
20	29 December 1973	20 April 1974	17
21	15 February 1975	10 May 1975	13
22	13 March 1976	1 May 1976	8

== Cast ==
Main cast

Actor	Portrayed	Years active	Series active	Episode count
Jack Warner	PC/Sgt George Dixon	1955–1976	1–22	432
Peter Byrne	PC/DC/DS/DI Andy Crawford	1955–1975	1–21	424
Arthur Rigby	Sgt Flint	1955–1965	1–11	253
Neil Wilson	PC 'Tubb' Barrell	1955–1957, 1963	1–3, 9	32
Jeanette Hutchinson	Mary Dixon/Crawford No. 2	1956–1964, 1969	2–10, 16	212
Moira Mannion	WP Sgt Grace Millard	1956–1961	2–8	142
Robert Cawdron	DI Bob Cherry	1956–1965	2–12	52
Graham Ashley	PC/DC Tommy Hughes	1958–1962	4–8	78
Anthony Parker	PC Bob Penney	1957–1959	4–5	56
Geoffrey Adams	PC/DC 'Laudie' Lauderdale	1958–1972	5–18	298
David Webster	Cadet Jamie MacPherson	1959–1962	6–9	92
Jocelyne Rhodes	WPC Kay Shaw	1960–1964, 1967, 1971	7–11, 14, 18	52
Hilda Fenemore	Jennie Wren	1960–1965	7–12	39
Nicholas Donnelly	PC/Sgt Johnny Wills	1961–1976	8–22	200
Anne Ridler	WP Sgt Chris Freeman	1962–1964	9–11	55
John Hughes	PC John Jones	1962–1964	9–10	50
Jan Miller	WPC Alex Johns	1962–1964	9–10	39
Peter Thornton	PC Burton	1964–1966, 1968	10–13, 15	42
Robert Arnold	PC/DC Swain	1964–1970	11–17	132
Anne Carroll	WPC Shirley Palmer	1964–1966	11–13	49
Duncan Lamont	Sgt Bob Cooper	1965–1966, 1968	12, 15	32
Joe Dunlop	DC Pearson	1966–1968	13–15	37
Michael Osborne	PC David Newton	1970–1972	17–19	42

Other cast members

Actor	Portrayed	Years active	Series active	Episode count
Billie Whitelaw	Mary Dixon No. 1	1955	1	6
Dorothy Casey	Nancy Murphy	1955–1963	1, 4–9	28
Harold Scott	Duffy Clayton	1956–1962	2, 4–9	18
Anthony Sagar	DS Brownrigg	1956–1958	2–4	7
David Lyn	PC Jenkins	1957	3	12
Robert Raglan	Supt ?	1959–1962, 1964, 1966	6–10, 13	13
Michael Nightingale	DC Jack Cotton	1961–1962	8	24
Ruth Lodge	WP Sgt "Scotty" Scott	1961–1962	8	17
Max Latimer	PC "Tiny" Bush	1961–1962	8–9	17
Janet Moss	WPC "Barney" Barnes	1961–1962	9	14
Christopher Gilmore	PC Clyde	1962–1963	9	25
Paul Elliott	Cadet Michael Bonnet	1963–1964	10	26
Anna Dawson	Mary Crawford No. 3	1964–1966	11–12	23
Geoffrey Kenion	PC Roberts	1964–1965	11	23
Zeph Gladstone	WPC Liz Harris	1964–1965	11	20
Jeanne Mockford	Miss Lucas	1964–1965	11	19
Ronald Bridges	PC Bryant	1965–1966	11–13	26
Jean Dallas	WPC Betty Williams	1965–1966	12–13	25
Pamela Buchner	WDC Ann Foster	1967–1968	14	15
Andrew Bradford	PC Turner	1967–1968	14	19
Jenny Logan	WPC Sally Reed	1968–1969	15–16	15
Kenneth Watson	DI/DCI Scott	1972–1973	19–20	14
Derek Anders	DC Webb	1972	19	14
Gregory de Polnay	DS Mike Brewer	1974–1975	20–21	29
Jacqueline Stanbury	WPC Hawkins	1974	20	5
Eve Karpf	Cara	1974	21	1
Stephen Marsh	PC Harry Dunne	1975–1976	21–22	13
Richard Heffer	DS Alan Bruton	1976	22	8
Ben Howard	DC Len Clayton	1976	22	8

== Archive status ==
Most of the original 432 episodes of Dixon of Dock Green are still missing due both to the programme being broadcast live and not recorded in the early days, and the BBC's later policy of reusing video tapes for new programmes. Only 33 episodes still exist in full, 19 exist incomplete, 5 exist through domestic audio recordings and 1 exists with picture but no audio. In February 2024 it was announced that the previously missing Series 5 episode "Duffy Calls the Tune" was recovered.

In an episode of "What's On Talking Pictures TV With Noel" in September 2024, Noel Cronin of Talking Pictures TV revealed that three missing episodes were found during the broadcast of the channel's repeat run of all surviving episodes in 2024 but did not state what they were.

The existing episodes are as follows:

=== Series 2 ===
- "Postman's Knock" (4 August 1956)
- "The Rotten Apple" (11 August 1956)
- "The Roaring Boy" (18 August 1956)
- "Pound of Flesh" (25 August 1956)
- "Father in Law" (1 September 1956)

=== Series 5 ===
- "Duffy Calls the Tune" (21 March 1959)

=== Series 7 ===
- "The Hot Seat" (15 October 1960)

=== Series 9 ===
- "A Home of One's Own" (24 November 1962)
- "Green Wedding" (5 January 1963)
- "Before the Ball" (16 March 1963)

=== Series 11 ===
- "A Scrap of Paint" (24 October 1964)

=== Series 14 ===
- "The Team" (25 November 1967)

=== Series 17 ===
- "Waste Land" (14 November 1970)

=== Series 18 ===
- "Jig-Saw" (18 November 1971)
- "Molenzicht" (1 January 1972)

=== Series 20 ===
- "Eye Witness" (29 December 1973)
- "Harry's Back" (12 January 1974)
- "Sounds" (13 April 1974)
- "Firearms Were Issued" (20 April 1974)

=== Series 21 ===
- "Target" (15 February 1975)
- "Seven for a Secret – Never to be Told" (22 February 1975)
- "Baubles, Bangles and Beads" (15 March 1975)
- "Looters Ltd" (29 March 1975)
- "A Slight Case of Love" (19 April 1975)
- "Conspiracy" (10 May 1975)

=== Series 22 ===
This is the only series where all episodes - eight in all (see under "DVD releases" below for details) - survive intact in the archive.

A trailer for "Sleigh Ride" (Series 17, Episode 17 - 6 March 1971) also exists as does an out-take sequence from "It's a Gift" (Series 21, Episode 3 – 1 March 1975) involving two criminals in which one of them, played by Victor Maddern, finds himself unable to deliver correctly the required line "It's down at Dock Green nick!" – referring to a stolen necklace. After two failed attempts, in which the line is spoken both as "It's down at Dock Green dick!" and "It's down at Dick Green dock!", Maddern asks the unseen director (Vere Lorrimer) "Couldn't I just say 'It's down at the nick'?"

== Music ==
The British music hall song "Maybe It's Because I'm a Londoner" was used originally as the theme song. It was composed by Hubert Gregg but was replaced with an instrumental theme composed by Jeff Darnell. This was later released as a single under the name "An Ordinary Copper". Darnell was Warner's original piano act partner in the 1940s. The harmonica was played by Tommy Reilly. Original incidental music for the early (1950s) series was written by Alan Yates (1912–1991).

== Home media ==
A collection of six of the seven surviving colour episodes across series 17-to-20 (the omitted one being Series 18, Episode 7, Molenzicht) was released by Acorn Media UK on DVD in July 2012, with the following episodes;

1. Waste Land (Series 17, Episode 1 – 14/11/70)
2. Jig-Saw (Series 18, Episode 1 – 20/11/71)
3. Eye Witness (Series 20, Episode 1 – 29/12/73)
4. Harry's Back (Series 20, Episode 3 – 12/01/74)
5. Sounds (Series 20, Episode 16 – 13/04/74)
6. Firearms Were Issued (Series 20, Episode 17 – 20/04/74)

A second collection of six episodes, comprising the entire penultimate 21st series, was released by Acorn Media UK on DVD in July 2013, with the following episodes:

1. Target (Series 21, Episode 1 – 15/02/75)
2. Seven for a Secret – Never To Be Told (Series 21, Episode 2 – 22/02/75)
3. Baubles, Bangles & Beads (Series 21, Episode 5 – 15/03/75)
4. Looters Ltd (Series 21, Episode 7 – 29/03/75)
5. A Slight Case of Love (Series 21, Episode 10 – 19/04/75)
6. Conspiracy (Series 21, Episode 13 – 10/05/75)

A third collection of eight episodes, comprising the entire final 22nd series, was released by Acorn Media UK on DVD in March 2015, with the following episodes:

1. Domino (Series 22, Episode 1 – 13/03/76)
2. The Job (Series 22, Episode 2 – 20/03/76)
3. Vagrant (Series 22, Episode 3 – 27/03/76)
4. Everybody's Business (Series 22, Episode 4 – 03/04/76)
5. Alice (Series 22, Episode 5 – 10/04/76)
6. Jackpot (Series 22, Episode 6 – 17/04/76)
7. Legacy (Series 22, Episode 7 – 24/04/76)
8. Reunion (Series 22, Episode 8 – 01/05/76)

This release also includes the following special features:-

- Picture gallery
- Audio Commentary on "Domino" with actor Stephen Marsh [P.C. Harry Dunne]
- Audio Commentary on "Legacy" with actor Ben Howard [D.C. Len Clayton]
- Audio Commentary on "Alice" with director Michael E. Briant
- The Final Cases: Documentary on the making of this last series, with actors Nicholas Donnelly [Sgt. Johnny Wills], Richard Heffer [D.S. Alan Bruton], Stephen Marsh [P.C. Harry Dunne], Gregory de Polnay [D.S. Mike Brewer] and production assistant Vivienne Cozens.
- Good Evening All: A tribute to Jack Warner, with Nicholas Donnelly, Richard Heffer, Stephen Marsh, Gregory de Polnay and Vivenne Cozens.
- Personnel Files: Extended Interviews with Nicholas Donnelly, Richard Heffer and Gregory de Polnay.

== Remake for BBC Radio ==
In 2005, the series was revived for BBC Radio, adapted by Sue Rodwell, with David Calder as George Dixon, David Tennant as Andy Crawford, and Charlie Brooks as Mary Dixon:

1. London Pride
2. Needle in a Haystack
3. Crawford's First Pinch
4. Dixie
5. Rock, Roll and Rattle
6. Roaring Boy

A second series followed in 2006, with Hamish Clark replacing Tennant owing to the latter's Doctor Who recording commitments:

1. Little Boy Blue
2. The Gentle Scratcher
3. The Captain (based on the episode "The Rotten Apple")
4. Andy Steps Up
5. Give a Dog a Good Name
6. The Key of the Nick

== Dixon in other shows ==
Christmas Night With The Stars was a BBC television show broadcast each Christmas night from 1958 to 1972 (with the exception of 1961, 1965 and 1966). The show featured specially made short seasonal editions (typically about 10 minutes long) of the previous year's most successful BBC sitcoms and light entertainment programmes. Dixon of Dock Green contributed short editions in the 1959, 1962, and 1963 shows, and featured some of the main members of the Dixon cast in Christmas Night with the Stars.

The Black and Blue Lamp by Arthur Ellis was screened in the BBC2 Screenplay series of drama plays on 7 September 1988. In the play – which begins with a montage of key scenes from The Blue Lamp – Tom Riley (Sean Chapman) and PC Hughes (Karl Johnson) are projected forwards into a violent parody of 1980s police procedurals called The Filth. Once there, they meet the corrupt Superintendent Cherry (Kenneth Cranham) and Superintendent Hammond (John Woodvine) and discover just how much policing has changed between the two periods.

One of Dixon's closing monologues from Dixon of Dock Green was recycled for the final scene of Ashes to Ashes in 2010. As in The Black and Blue Lamp, characters in Ashes to Ashes and its predecessor, Life on Mars, were seemingly sent into different eras of policing. Moreover, Dixon's resurrection for Dixon of Dock Green, after he was killed in The Blue Lamp and the fact that he apparently continued to serve as a police officer well past the usual retirement age find a parallel in the stories of the principal characters in Life on Mars and Ashes to Ashes, being explained in the final episode.

The ending credits to the show were seen in the 2016 animated film Ethel & Ernest.
