= Jonathan Ellery =

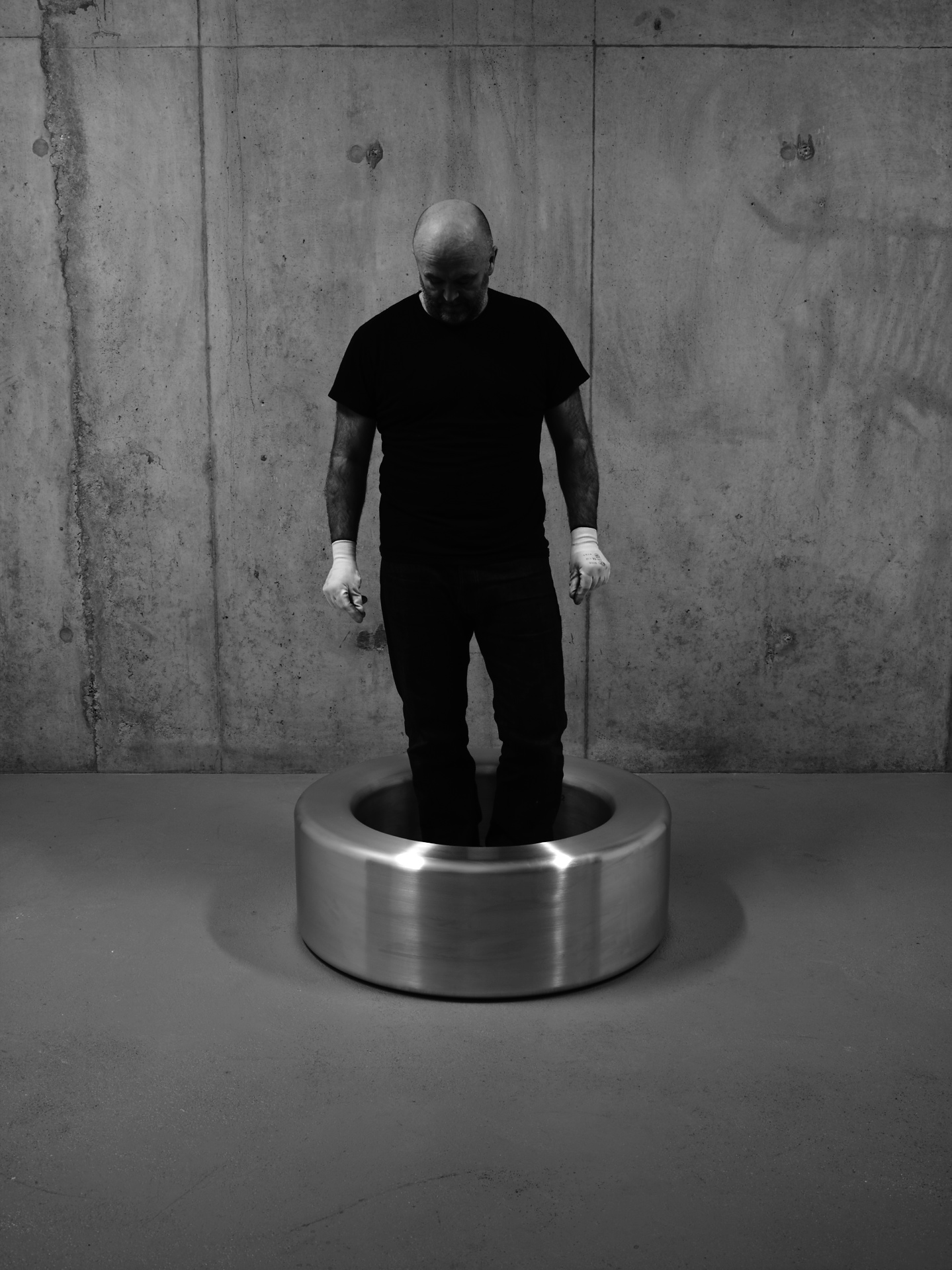

Jonathan Ellery (born 1964) is an English artist and founder of British design studio Browns.

== Biography ==
Ellery was born in Welwyn Garden City, Hertfordshire and raised in Cornwall. His father was an artist and ceramicist who set up Tremaen pottery in Newlyn and Penzance.

Ellery studied Graphic Design at Bournemouth and on graduation moved to London to begin his career as a Graphic Designer. In 1998, following success and Creative Directorship at various companies, Ellery co-founded the design studio Browns. In 2002 Ellery took over ownership of Browns. It is now run creatively by himself and Aaron Easterbrook, combining cultural and commercial commissions. Clients include Channel 4, Hiscox, Bafta and Dries van Noten. In 2008 Ellery launched Browns Editions, the publishing arm of Browns, producing limited edition, hand numbered titles. The Browns Editions catalogue covers photography, conceptual and fine art books.

Ellery's first notable shift towards balancing design and his work as a solo artist occurred in 2005, with "136 Points of Reference". This took the form of an exhibition held at the Andrew Roth Gallery in New York, and a self-published art title, the first in what is now a series of five. This coupling of exhibition and book continued with "Unrest", a show featuring large-scale brass works and a sound and video piece projecting the numbers 1–87, corresponding to the book "87", and "Constance", a "live performance" featuring a drummer and a girl undressing, held at The Wapping Project in London.

In 2008 Ellery was nominated for the "Brit Insurance Designs of the Year" and exhibited at the Design Museum in London.

In 2009 Ellery held his fourth solo entitled "Ellery’s Theory of Neo-conservative Creationism". It consisted of large scale, machined, solid brass suspended sculptures, sound and moving image. To commemorate the show, a black and white catalogue was also published highlighting artworks that had been machined by Ellery into brass.

The Hen House (2013) includes works in cast iron, aluminium, and brass, as well as photography. It is accompanied by a limited edition catalogue published by Browns Editions.

Jonathan Ellery lives above his studio in Bermondsey, South London.

== Solo exhibitions ==
- 2005 136 Points of Reference, Andrew Roth Gallery, New York
- 2007 Unrest, The Wapping Project, London
- 2008 Constance, The Wapping Project, London
- 2009 Ellery's Theory of Neo-conservative Creationism, The Wapping Project, London
- 2011 The Human Condition, Londonewcastle Project Space, London
- 2013 The Hen House, Londonewcastle Project Space, London

== Publications ==
- 2005 136 Points of Reference, Jonathan Ellery, Published by Browns Editions
- 2006 87 Ellery, Jonathan Ellery, Published by Browns Editions
- 2007 In and Out, Jonathan Ellery, Published by Browns Editions
- 2007 Works in Brass, Jonathan Ellery, Published by Browns Editions
- 2008 Constance, Jonathan Ellery, Published by Browns Editions
- 2009 Ellery's Theory of Neo-conservative Creationism, Jonathan Ellery, Published by Browns Editions
- 2009 Ellery's Theory of Neo-conservative Creationism. A Catalogue, Jonathan Ellery, Published by Browns Editions
- 2011 The Human Condition, Jonathan Ellery, Published by Browns Editions
- 2013 The Hen House, Jonathan Ellery, Published by Browns Editions
- 2015 Religious Symbols/ London Garden Birds/ Numbers/ Sexual Predators/ Political Symbols. Jonathan Ellery. Published by Browns Editions.
- 2016 Tribes 1, Jonathan Ellery, Published by Browns Editions
- 2016 Mergers and Acquisitions Tenugui/ Catalogue, Jonathan Ellery, Published by Browns Editions
- 2016 A Bewildered Herd, Jonathan Ellery, Published by Browns Editions
- 2017 Populism, Jonathan Ellery, Published by Browns Editions
- 2018 HERE IT IS HERE IT AINT, Jonathan Ellery & Lawrence Weiner, Published by Browns Editions
