= Shadwell Basin =

Disused dock in East London, England

Coordinates: 51.508°N 0.053°W

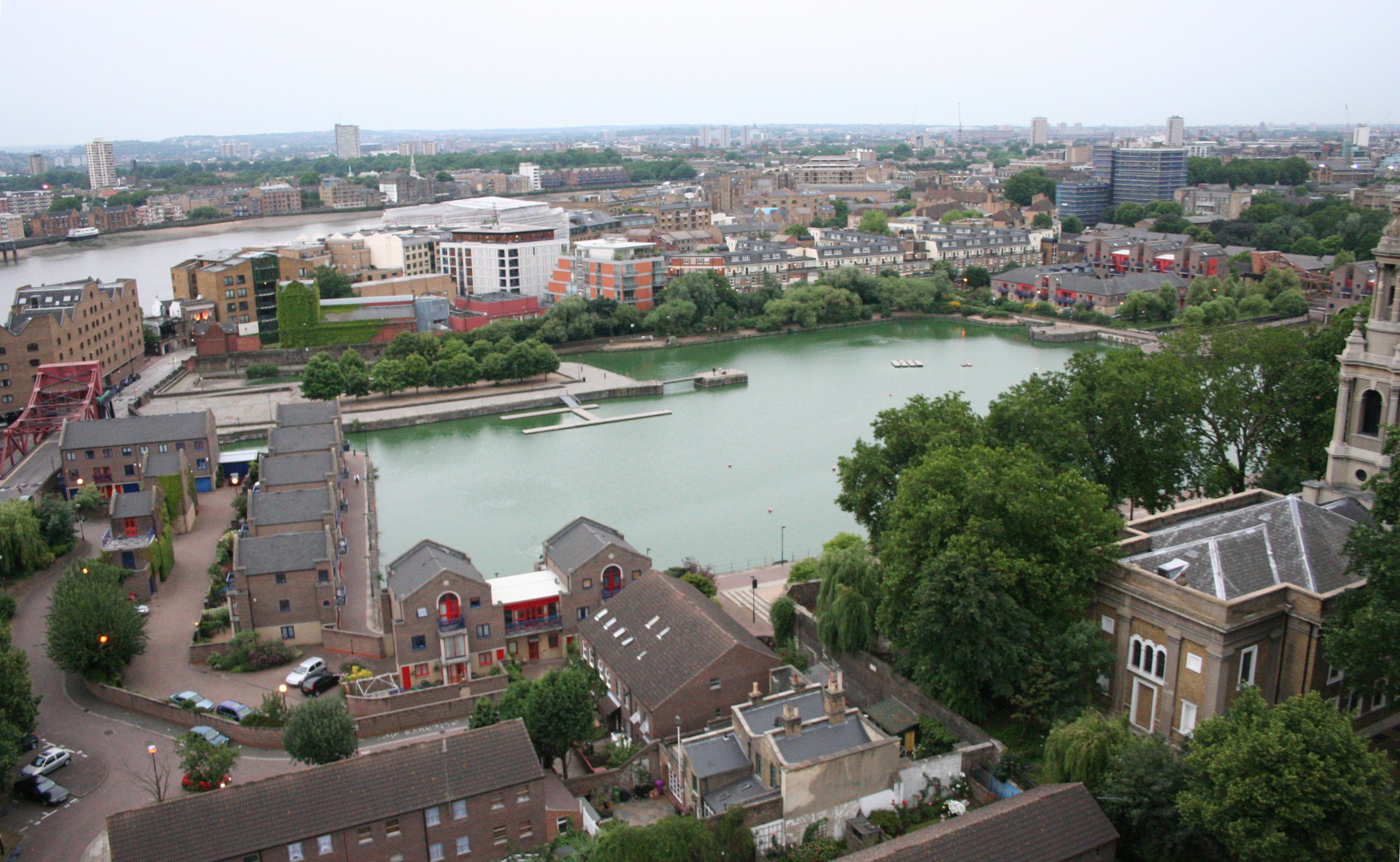

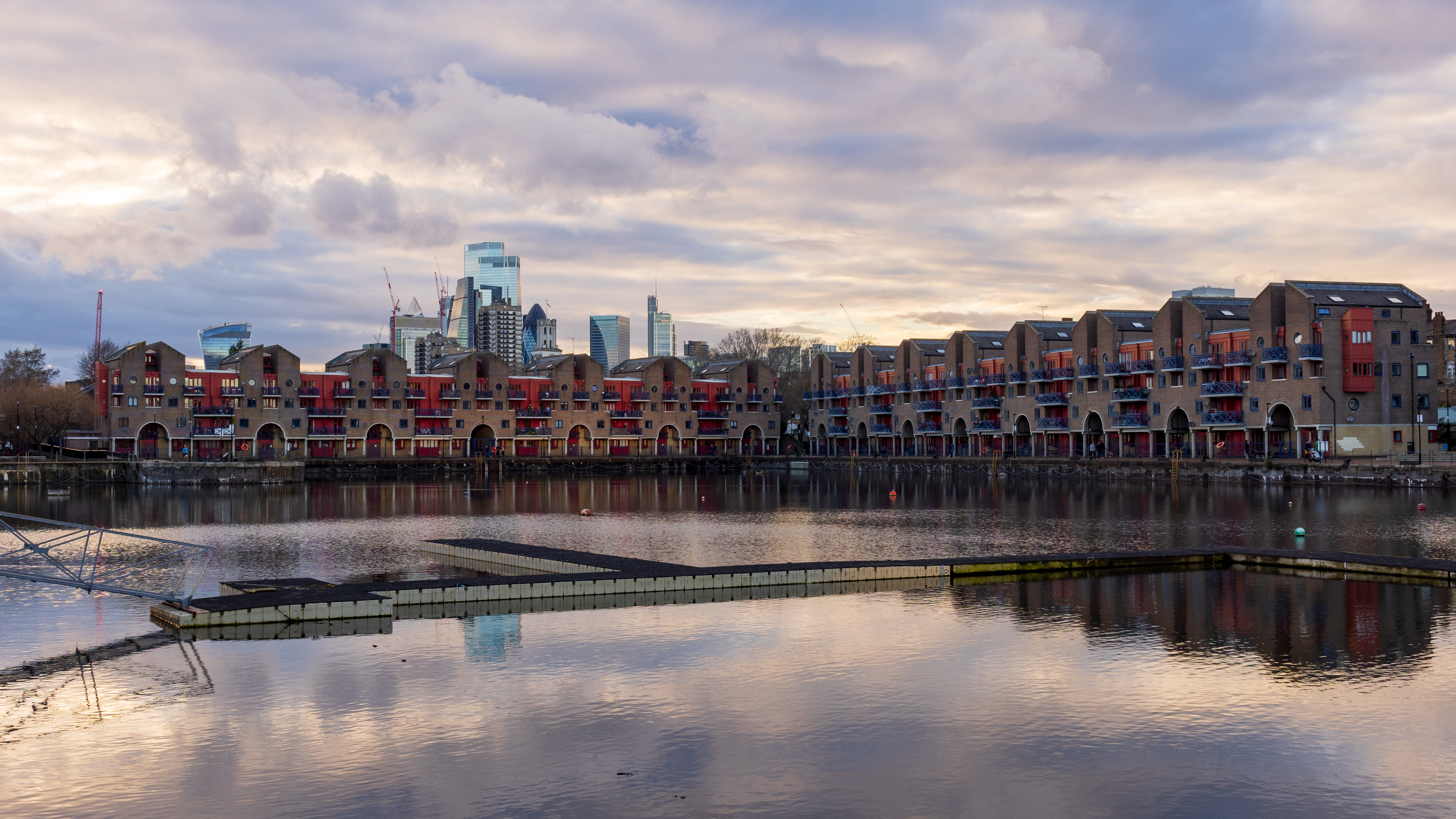
- Shadwell Basin in 2023

- Location within Greater London
- OS grid reference: TQ351806
- London borough: Tower Hamlets
- Ceremonial county: Greater London
- Region: London
- Country: England
- Sovereign state: United Kingdom
- Post town: LONDON
- Police: Metropolitan
- Fire: London
- Ambulance: London
- UK Parliament: Poplar and Limehouse
- London Assembly: City and East

Listed Building – Grade II
- Official name: Shadwell Basin Housing, 5-54 (cons) Maynards Quay, 1-62 (cons) Newlands Quay and 1-35 (odd) Peartree Lane
- Designated: 18 April 2018
- Reference no.: 1451936

Shadwell Basin is a housing and leisure complex built around a disused dock in the London Borough of Tower Hamlets. It is situated on the north side of the river Thames, one mile east (downstream) of the Tower of London and Tower Bridge.

The basin was formerly part of the London Docks, built by the London Dock Company at Shadwell and Wapping as part of the wider dockland of the Port of London.

Unlike some of the London Docks which have been landfilled, Shadwell Basin, the most easterly part of the complex, has been retained. It is now a maritime square of 2.8 hectares used for recreational purposes (including sailing, canoeing and fishing) and is surrounded on three sides by a waterside housing development designed by British architects MacCormac, Jamieson, Prichard and Wright (MJPW) and constructed 1986–1988.

The residential buildings are four and five storeys with façades of alternating open arches and enclosed structure, echoing the scale of traditional 19th century dockside warehouses, with a colonnade at quayside. It took inspiration from the Royal Albert Dock in Liverpool. The development, made up of buildings on Newlands Quay, Maynards Quay and Peartree Lane, was added to the National Heritage List for England by Historic England as Grade II listed in 2018, part of a listing of postmodern buildings.

Shadwell Basin has Benson Quay on its south-west corner with its south side overlooked by Riverside Mansions in Milk Yard and the Monza Building in Monza Street and, at its south-eastern end, the former Wapping Hydraulic Power Station building.

St Paul's Church is located to the north of the basin, with the St Paul's Church Conservation Area extends to the water's edge with a terraced quayside that includes an outdoor gym.

A Scherzer bascule bridge spans one of the entrances on the east side of the basin. This was built in the 1930s by the Port of London Authority and was restored by the London Docklands Development Corporation during their redevelopment of the site in the 1980s.

Shadwell Basin is a popular public route for cyclists, joggers and pedestrians with a walkway alongside the water as part of the linked open spaces and canals between the river and Hermitage Basin near St Katharine Docks to the west.

== History ==
The London Docks expanded eastward in the 1830s with the opening of the Eastern Dock and Shadwell Basin (built 1828–32). To provide these new docks with access to the river, a new entrance at Shadwell was built. Opened in 1832, it was named Shadwell Entrance (the main entrance to the London Dock was through Wapping Entrance with a third entrance at Hermitage Basin).

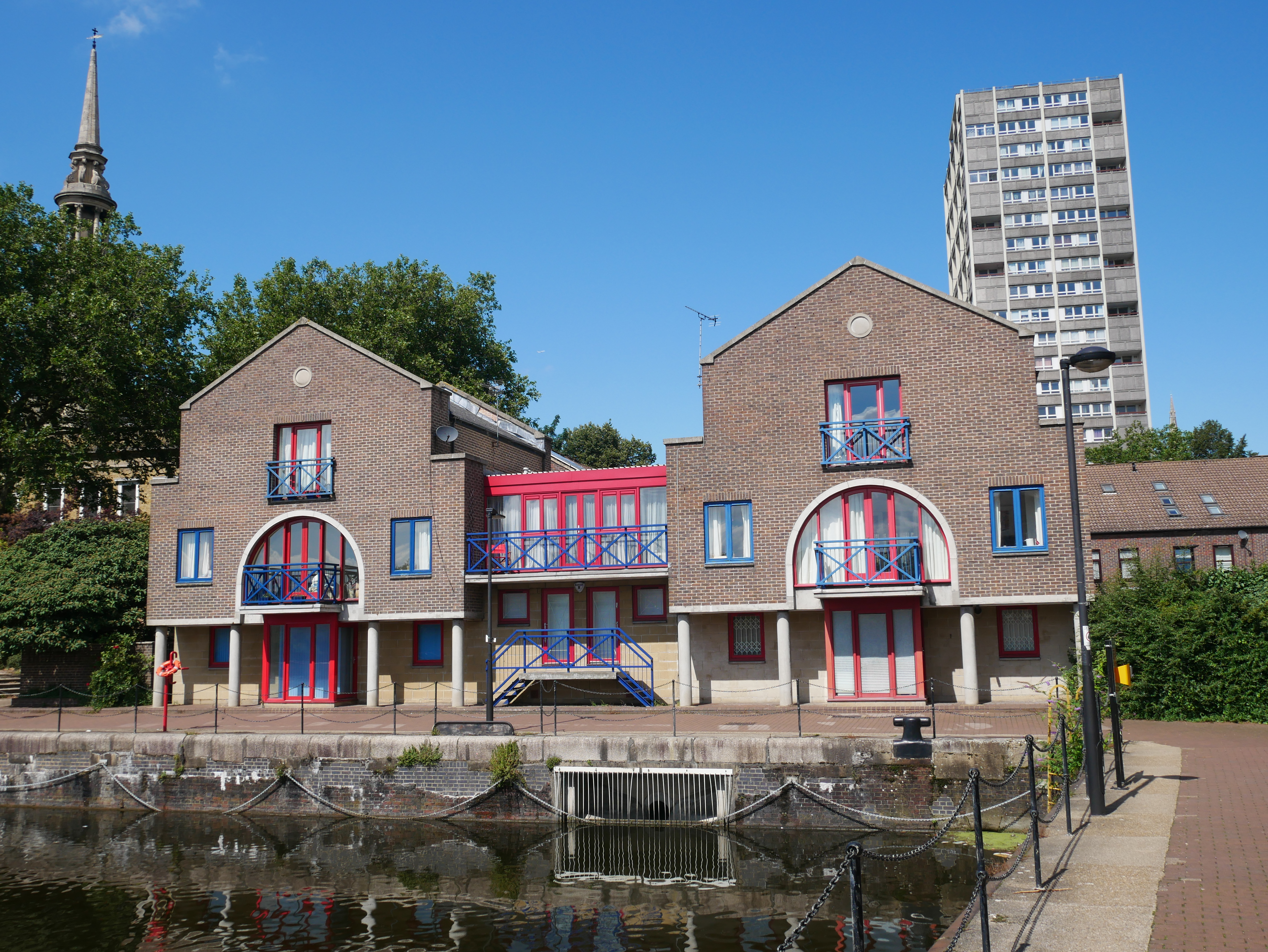
Part of the Shadwell Basin Housing built in the 1980s and now Grade II listed

By the 1850s, the London Dock Company had recognised that the entrances at both Wapping and Shadwell were too small to accommodate the newer and larger ships coming into service. In 1854-58 the company built a new larger entrance (45 feet wide) and a new basin at Shadwell (the only element of the London Docks system to have survived redevelopment to this day) linked to the west part of the docks by Eastern Dock and the short Tobacco Dock.

The small size of the London Docks made them outdated by the early 20th century as steam power meant ships were built too large to fit into them. Cargoes were unloaded downriver and then ferried by barge to warehouses in Wapping. This system was uneconomic and inefficient and one of the main reasons that London's western docks (St Katharine Dock and the London Docks) were the first to close in the 1960s.

The London Docks complex closed to shipping in 1969. Purchased by the London Borough of Tower Hamlets, Shadwell Basin and the western part of the London Docks fell into a derelict state, mostly a large open tract of land and water. Acquired in 1981 by the London Docklands Development Corporation (LDDC), redevelopment of Shadwell Basin took place in 1987 resulting in 169 houses and flats being built around the retained historic dock.

== Landmarks ==
(North)

- St. Paul's Church, Shadwell — the Church of Sea Captains

(South)

- The former Wapping Hydraulic Power Station building (previously the site of the Wapping Project arts venue and Wapping Food restaurant).
- Prospect of Whitby pub

(East)

- King Edward VII Memorial Park — giving access to the River Thames
- The Shadwell Basin Outdoor Activity Centre - including Tower Hamlets Canoe Club, Docklands Dive School and Pier Head Prep Montessori School

== People ==
People associated with the area:

- Captain James Cook (1728–1779) lived in the area, and some of his children were baptised at St. Paul's Church, Shadwell
- Jane Randolph Jefferson (1720–1776), mother of President of the United States Thomas Jefferson, was born in Shakespeare Walk (a road which ran from north to south in the middle of what is now Shadwell Basin) and was baptised at St. Paul's Church, Shadwell
- John Wesley (1703–1791) preached at St. Paul's Church, Shadwell
- Sir William Henry Perkin (1838–1907) chemist who discovered aniline purple dye was baptised at St. Paul's Church, Shadwell

== Neighbouring streets ==
North of Shadwell Basin

- Newlands Quay — formerly Elbow Lane (in 1862)

East of Shadwell Basin

- Pear Tree Lane — formerly Fox's Lane (in 1862). Named after The Pear Tree, the inn where the second group of Ratcliff Highway murders took place.

West of Shadwell Basin

- Maynards Quay off Garnet Street — formerly New Gravel Lane (in 1862)
- Benson Quay

South of Shadwell Basin starting from the west:

- Milk Yard
- Monza Street
- Wapping Wall
