= The Wapping Project =

The Wapping Project is a UK London-based arts organisation and a working name of Women's Playhouse Trust (WPT) since 2000. WPT is a registered charity (286384) established in 1981 and incorporated in 1982. The project works as a commissioner and producer of art.

== History ==
Throughout the 1980s and the early 1990s, WPT worked predominantly at the Royal Court Theatre, London. The first WPT production was a revival of Aphra Behn's The Lucky Chance, performed at the Royal Court in 1984, starring Alan Rickman and Harriet Walter. In 1993 WPT began to mount work in the derelict Wapping Hydraulic Power Station in the East End of London. WPT purchased the building from London Development Agency and invested £4 million in converting it into an arts centre. The conversion was designed and overseen by architectural practice Shed 54. The new gallery space opened on the 10 October 2000. WPT sold the Wapping Hydraulic Power Station in 2013.

WPT's founder and artistic Director, Jules Wright, who was diagnosed with cancer in February 2015 and died on 21 June 2015.

WPT continues its artistic work under its working name The Wapping Project, headed by its former Deputy Director, Marta Michalowska, and a longstanding collaborator of Jules Wright, Thomas Zanon-Larcher.

== Recent work by The Wapping Project ==
- Andrea Luka Zimmerman's films Wayfaring Stranger (2024) and feature documentary Erase and Forget (2018)
- Shona Illingworth's installation Topologies of Air
- Mairéad McClean's installation Making Her Mark
