= Wapping Wall =

Street in Wapping, London

Coordinates: 51°30′23″N 0°3′11″W

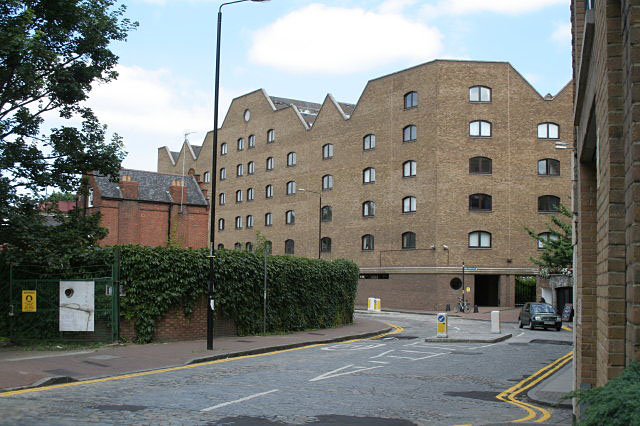
Converted warehouse apartments

Wapping Wall is a street located in the East End of London at Wapping. It runs parallel to the northern bank of the River Thames, with many converted warehouses facing the river.

On this street is the Wapping Hydraulic Power Station, built in 1890 and closed in 1977. It is now run as an arts centre and restaurant. Opposite on the south side of the street and next to the river is The Prospect of Whitby, a historic public house.

Close by are the Shadwell Basin and the Rotherhithe Tunnel under the Thames.
