= Wapping Hydraulic Power Station =

Former industrial building in London, England

Coordinates: 51°30′24″N 0°3′9″W

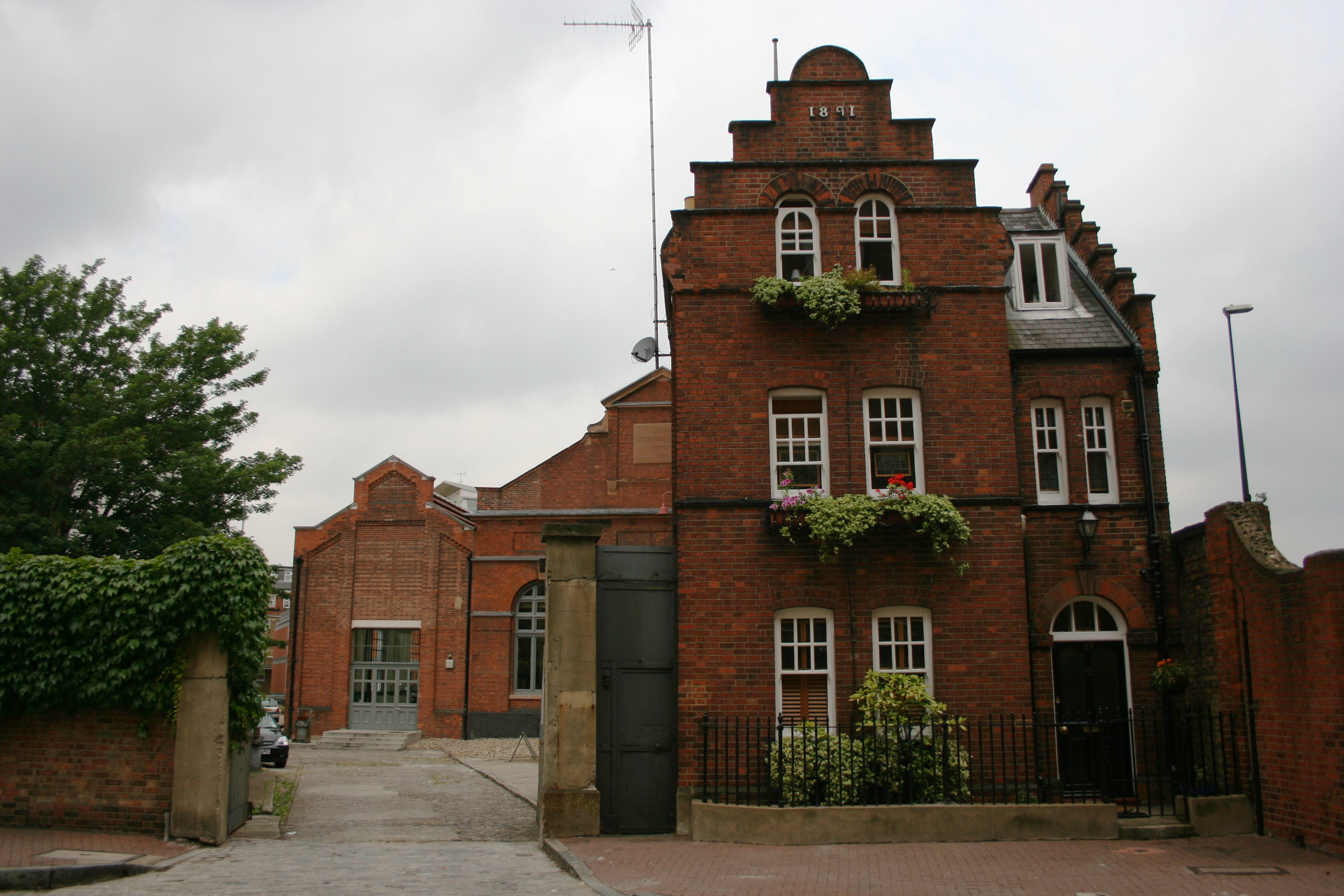
- The Engine House at Wapping Hydraulic Power Station (September 2006)
- Interactive map of the Wapping Hydraulic Power Station area

General information
- Status: Completed
- Location: Wapping, England
- Opened: 1890
- Renovated: 1993; 2000
- Closed: 30 June 1977 (as power station)
- Client: London Hydraulic Power Company

Design and construction
- Developer: UK Real Estate Ltd. (2013)
- Designations: Grade II* listed building

The Wapping Hydraulic Power Station (built 1890) was originally run by the London Hydraulic Power Company in Wapping, London, England. Originally, it operated using steam, and was later converted to use electricity. It was used to power machinery, including lifts, across London. The Tower Subway was used to transfer the power, and steam, to districts south of the river.

The surviving complex consists of the engine house, boiler house, water tanks, accumulator tower, reservoir, boiler master's house, seven 1950s throw ram pumps, a 1950s pilot accumulator, a gantry crane, two transformers and switchgear. It is located at Wapping Wall.

The building was designated a grade II* listed building in December 1977. After its closure as a pumping station on 30 June 1977, the building was converted by architectural practice Shed 54 and reopened by Jules Wright, as an arts centre and restaurant (Wapping Food). It held its first exhibition in 1993, and opened in a new form in 2000. Exhibitions were mounted across the building including the Boiler House and the Engine House, with most of the original equipment still in place. Women's Playhouse Trust sold the building in 2013 to focus on its core mission of commissioning new art.

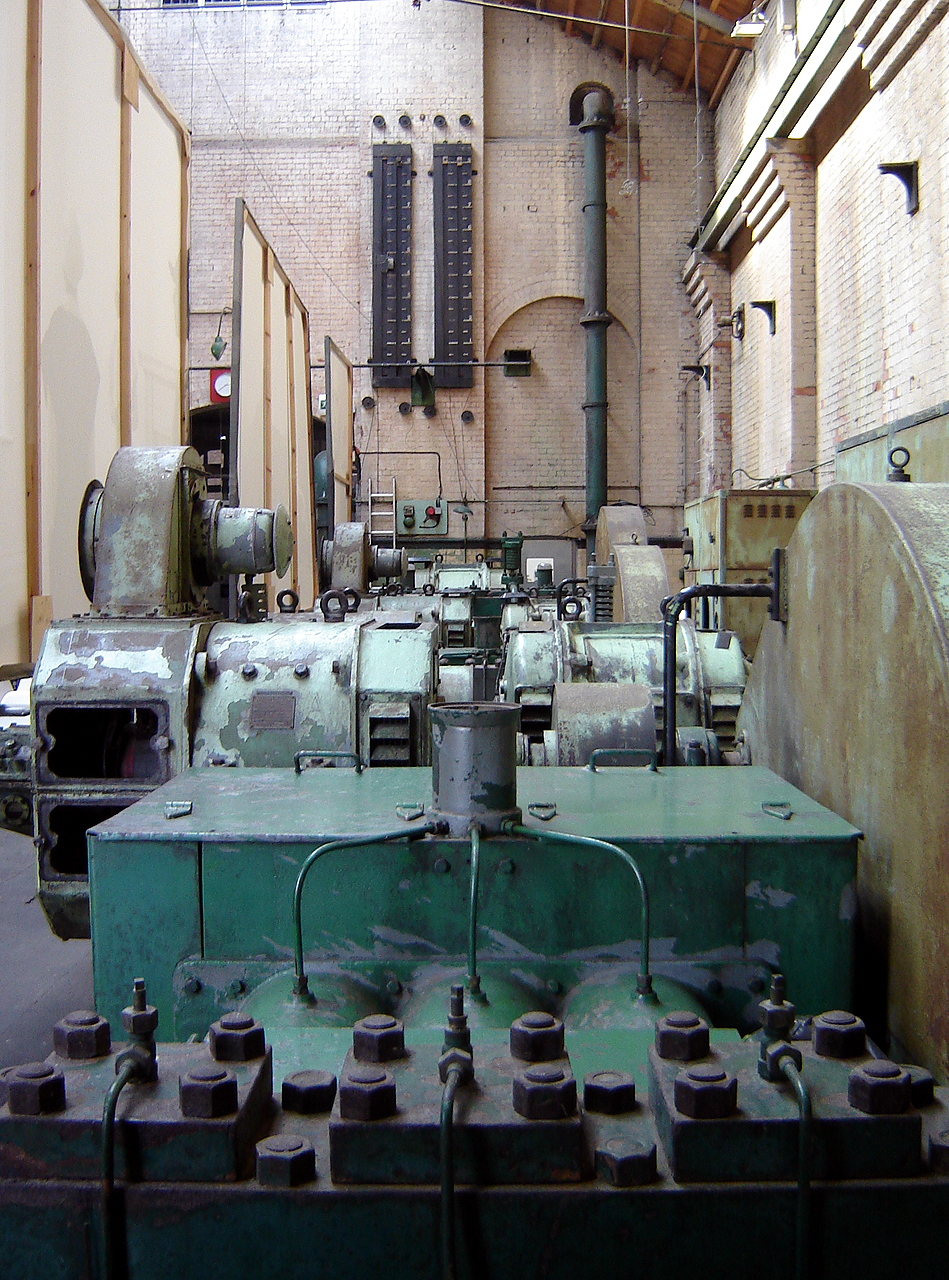
The Engine House at Wapping Hydraulic Power Station in September 2006,

In 2013, the freehold of the building was sold to developers UK Real Estate Ltd.

In March 2019 planning applications were submitted to Tower Hamlets Council for extensive renovation of the existing buildings, new buildings and extensive earth works of the old water reservoirs below the south court yard. The buildings are intended for office and restaurant space. Work is planned to commence in summer 2020 for completion during summer 2021.
