= List of people from Edmonton, London =

This list of people from Edmonton, London includes people were born, educated, or lived in Edmonton, London:

- John Clayton Adams (landscape artist)
- Gladys Aylward (Protestant missionary)
- Tony Barber (musician)
- Percival Harry Barton (footballer)
- John Beck (footballer)
- Dudley Benjafield (racecar driver and alumnus of the University of London)
- Black the Ripper (rapper)
- Eddie Bovington (footballer)
- Karren Brady (businesswoman)
- Jack Burkett (footballer)
- Albert Cadwell (footballer)
- Robert Cecil (statesman)
- John Christie (recipient of the Victoria Cross)
- Benjamin Clementine (singer and poet)
- Cyril Coaffee (athlete)
- John Cole (fashion photographer)
- Ritchie Coster (actor)
- Charles Coward (World War II hero)
- Lewis Cozens (railway historian and author)
- Steve Crabb, middle distance athlete
- Jimmy Dimmock (footballer)
- Florence Dugdale (writer)
- David Evans (British politician)
- Ray Evans (footballer)
- Neale Fenn (footballer)
- Wally Fielding (footballer)
- Bruce Forsyth (entertainer)
- John French (photographer)
- Michael Garner (actor)
- Anthony Giddens (sociologist)
- David W. Goodall (botanist and ecologist)
- Frederick Grace (boxer) Olympic champion
- Bobby Graham (musician)
- Florence Green (World War I veteran)
- Nigel Havers (actor)
- Chas Hodges (musician)
- David Jason (actor)
- Michael Keating (actor)
- John Keats (poet)
- Jo Kuffour (footballer)
- Charles Lamb (essayist)
- Larry Lamb (actor)
- Mary Lamb (writer)
- Derek Lampe (footballer)
- Ron Lewin (footballer)
- Derek Lewis (footballer)
- Arthur Lowdell (footballer)
- Tony Marchi (footballer)
- Peter Meaden (publicist)
- Les Medley (footballer)
- Romaine Mundle (footballer)
- Dave Murray (Iron Maiden) (musician)
- Malcolm Needs (screenwriter)
- Kevin Nugent (footballer)
- Joe O'Cearuill (footballer)
- Reece Oxford (footballer)
- Kenneth Pestell (cricketer)
- Omer Riza (footballer)
- Paul Rodgers (footballer)
- Leonard Roth (mathematician)
- Billy Sage (1893–1968), professional footballer
- Lee Smelt (footballer)
- John Thomas Smith (engraver)
- Mike Smith (Dave Clark Five) (musician)
- Norman Smith (producer, musician)
- Jimmy Smy (footballer)
- Jim Standen (footballer)
- Brook Taylor (mathematician)
- Mike Thalassitis (footballer and TV personality)
- Tion Wayne (rapper)
- Leslie Welch (radio and TV personality)
- Chris Williams (Led Bib)
- B.J. Wilson (original Procol Harum rock drummer)
- Aubrey Woods (actor)

== Notable people educated in Edmonton ==
- Edmonton County School
  - Kriss Akabusi (athlete)
  - Basil Hoskins (actor)
  - Kevan James (cricketer)
  - Kelly Johnson (guitarist)
  - Debbie Kurup (actress)
  - Larry Lamb (actor)
  - Roy Strong (historian)
  - Norman Tebbit (politician)
  - Ray Winstone (actor)
- The Latymer School
  - Eileen Atkins (actress)
  - Johnny Haynes (footballer)
  - Bruce Forsyth (entertainer)
  - Clare-Hope Ashitey (actress)
  - Syed Kamall, Conservative MEP
  - Albert Meltzer, British anarchist
  - Tim Pope (film and video director)
  - Yorick Wilks, early artificial intelligence researcher
  - B.J. Wilson, original drummer with Procol Harum
- Other
  - Malcolm Needs (screenwriter)
