= 175th (2/3rd London) Brigade =

Military unit

The 175th (2/3rd London) Brigade was an infantry brigade formation of the Territorial Force of the British Army. The brigade was formed as a 2nd Line of the 169th (1/3rd London) Brigade and was assigned to the 58th (2/1st London) Division, itself formed as a 2nd Line of 56th (1/1st London) Division, and served on the Western Front during the First World War.

== Formation ==
- 2/9th (County of London) Battalion, London Regiment
- 2/10th (County of London) Battalion, London Regiment
- 2/11th (County of London) Battalion, London Regiment
- 2/12th (County of London) Battalion, London Regiment
- 44th Machine Gun Company, Machine Gun Corps
- 215th Machine Gun Company, Machine Gun Corps
- 175th Trench Mortar Battery
