= Smy =

SMY or smy may refer to:

== People ==
- Jimmy Smy (1907–1997), English football player

== Places ==
- SMY, the IATA code of Simenti Airport, Senegal
- St Mary Cray railway station, London, National Rail station code

== Other ==
- smy, the ISO 639 code of Semnani language
- SmY RNA, found in some nematode worms
