= Pestell =

Pestell is a surname. Notable people with the surname include:

- John Pestell (1916–2005), British South African police officer
- Kenneth Pestell (born 1931), British cricketer
- Reginald Wells-Pestell, Baron Wells-Pestell (1910–1991), British social worker and politician
- Richard Pestell, Australian oncologist and endocrinologist
