= Finsbury Rifles =

Finsbury Rifles 11th Battalion, London Regiment 61st (Middlesex) Heavy AA Regiment 12th (Finsbury Rifles) Light AA Regiment
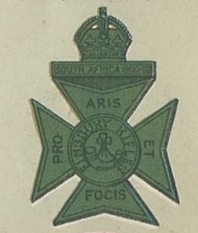
- Cap badge of the Finsbury Rifles
- Active: 6 March 1860 – 1 May 1961
- Country: United Kingdom
- Branch: Volunteer Force/Territorial Army
- Type: Infantry Battalion; Anti-Aircraft Regiment
- Garrison/HQ: Penton Street drill hall, Pentonville
- Nickname: Pentonville Pissers
- Mottos: Pro aris et focis ('For hearth and home')
- Engagements: Gallipoli Campaign; Palestine; Mesopotamian campaign Western Front; Battle of Britain; The Blitz; North African campaign Sicily campaign Italian campaign

The Finsbury Rifles was a unit of Britain's Volunteer Force and later Territorial Army from 1860 to 1961. It saw action at Gallipoli, in Palestine and on the Western Front during the First World War. In the Second World War, it served in the Anti-Aircraft (AA) role during the Battle of Britain and the Blitz, then in North Africa, Sicily and Italy.

== Volunteers ==
The unit began as the Clerkenwell Rifles, formed in the Clerkenwell and Finsbury districts of London during the invasion scare of 1859–60 that led to the creation of hundreds of Rifle Volunteer Corps (RVCs). It was adopted by the Lord Lieutenant of Middlesex as the 39th Middlesex RVC, and he issued the first officers' commissions on 6 March 1860, the commanding officer (CO) being Lieutenant-Colonel Colvill, Governor of Coldbath Fields Prison and a former Captain in the 71st Foot. The corps was based at 16 Cold Bath Square, Clerkenwell. Colvill was later obliged to relinquish the command by the Middlesex magistrates, who considered it incompatible with his prison duties. He was replaced as CO by Major Henry Penton (1817–1882) of the 3rd (Royal Westminster) Middlesex Militia, a local landowner in Clerkenwell whose grandfather had developed the district of Pentonville. The unit's headquarters later moved to 17 Penton Street in Pentonville, and it became known from the beery ways of its members as the 'Pentonville Pissers'.

Together with the Central London Rangers, the Clerkenwell unit initially formed the 3rd Middlesex Administrative Battalion of RVCs, but because both units soon consisted of eight companies they were made independent battalions and the administrative battalion disbanded. In 1862 The Finsbury Rifle Volunteer Corps was officially added to its title, and it continued to expand, reaching a strength of 10 companies in 1870. Other Middlesex RVCs had been less successful and disappeared, so the Finsbury Rifles became the 21st Middlesex RVC in a general renumbering carried out in 1880.

Following the Childers Reforms the Finsbury Rifles became the 7th Volunteer Battalion of the Kings Royal Rifle Corps (KRRC) in 1881, but without changing its title. It had already adopted the Rifle green uniform with red Facing colour of the KRRC. The Stanhope Memorandum of December 1888 proposed a Mobilisation Scheme for Volunteer units, which would assemble in their own brigades at key points in case of war. In peacetime these brigades provided a structure for collective training. Under this scheme the Finsbury Rifles formed part of the North London Brigade which would assemble at Caterham under the command of the CO of the Coldstream Guards.

During the Second Boer War the battalion was increased from ten to 12 companies, and formed a service company of volunteers to serve alongside the Regulars in South Africa, earning the Battle honour South Africa 1900–1902.

== Territorial Force ==
The Volunteers were subsumed into the new Territorial Force (TF) under the Haldane Reforms of 1908. The Borough of Finsbury had been incorporated into the new County of London since 1900, and so the unit joined the newly-created London Regiment, which consisted entirely of TF infantry battalions, with no Regular component. It became the 11th (County of London) Battalion, The London Regiment (Finsbury Rifles), with its headquarters and all eight companies located at 17 Penton Street. The North London Brigade became 3rd London Brigade in the TF's 1st London Division.

== First World War ==
=== Mobilisation ===
Annual training for 1st London Division had just started when war was declared on 4 August 1914, and the Finsbury Rifles promptly mustered at Pentonville for mobilisation. In mid-August it moved with 3rd London Bde to Bullswater Camp, near Pirbright in Surrey, and in Septyember to Crowborough in East Sussex. The TF was intended to be a home defence force and its members could not be compelled to serve outside the UK, but on 10 August TF units were invited to volunteer for overseas service and the majority did so. On 31 August 1914, the formation of Reserve or 2nd-Line units for each existing TF unit was authorised. Initially these were formed from men who had not volunteered for overseas service, and the recruits who were flooding in. The titles of these 2nd Line units would be the same as the original, but distinguished by a '2/' prefix. In this way duplicate battalions, brigades and divisions were created, mirroring those TF formations being sent overseas. Later they were mobilised for overseas service in their own right. the Finsbury Rifles formed its own second line on 3 September 1914.

Several battalions of the division were soon posted away to relieve Regular Army garrisons in the Mediterranean or to supplement the British Expeditionary Force on the Western Front. By January 1915, only the 1/10th (Hackney) and 1/11th (Finsbury Rifles) Battalions remained with the artillery and other support elements of the division, and these were attached to the 2nd-Line TF division (2/1st London Division) that was being formed.

=== 1/11th Battalion ===
==== Suvla Bay ====
In April 1915, the 1/10th and 1/11th Battalions were sent to Norwich to join 162nd (East Midland) Brigade in 54th (East Anglian) Division, which was being prepared for overseas service. On 29 July 1915 the battalion embarked at Liverpool aboard the RMS Aquitania bound for the Mediterranean, and arrived at Mudros on 6 August. After transferring to a smaller vessel it landed on 11 August at Suvla Bay on the Gallipoli Peninsula. The Gallipoli Campaign had been in progress for several months and had reached stalemate. The Landing at Suvla Bay on 6 August had been a flank attack designed to manoeuvre the Turks out of their defences, but it too became bogged down in trench warfare.

On 15 August the battalion took part in the action at Kiretch Tepe Ridge, where 162nd Brigade's task was to protect the flank of the two attacking brigades. Little fighting was anticipated. There was no time to reconnoitre and the brigade advanced towards the lower slopes of the ridge with 'no information about the probable whereabouts of the enemy'. After about 400 yards the leading battalion, the 1/5th Bedfordshire Regiment, came under increasing rifle and machine-gun fire in the gullies and lost cohesion. Early in the action, Brigadier-General de Winton was wounded and Lieutenant Colonel Byrne took command of the Brigade with Major G.F.M. Davies assuming command of 1st Battalion. Captain Crosbie, the Adjutant, was also wounded early. Parties of the 1/10th and 1/11th Londons were 'dribbled forward' to reinforce the line. The battalions breasted the gully-riven slopes of the ridge, and ultimately advanced the left of the line to the south-western shoulder of Kidney Hill but they were unsupported, and withdrew that night to positions in Lone Tree Gully. Major G.F.M. Davies of 1/11th Londons was killed while covering the retreat of the rear party and Captain Lewer assumed command. Lone Tree Gully was shelled all the next day. Captain Lewer was wounded with Captain Windsor taking command. During the night the positions were consolidated as far as possible. The battalion's total casualties in the two days were about 360, including nine officers.

Over the next two months the 1/11th Battalion alternated in the firing line with the 1/5th Bedfords; when not in the line the battalion was in reserve at 'Finsbury Vale'. In October the dismounted 1/1st Suffolk Yeomanry were attached to the Londons for training, and then relieved the battalion, which went into a rest camp dubbed 'Penton Hill' from 26 to 31 October. During November the battalion alternated with the Suffolk Yeomanry in the line. The 1/11th Battalion was evacuated to Mudros on 3 December, and shortly afterwards the Gallipoli operation was closed down.

==== Egypt ====
The 54th Division, very weak from battle casualties and sickness, was re-embarked on 13 December and landed at Alexandria in Egypt on 18 December. After recuperating, most of the division moved into the Suez Canal defences at the end of March 1916. It stayed there under the Egyptian Expeditionary Force (EEF) until the beginning of 1917.

==== Palestine ====
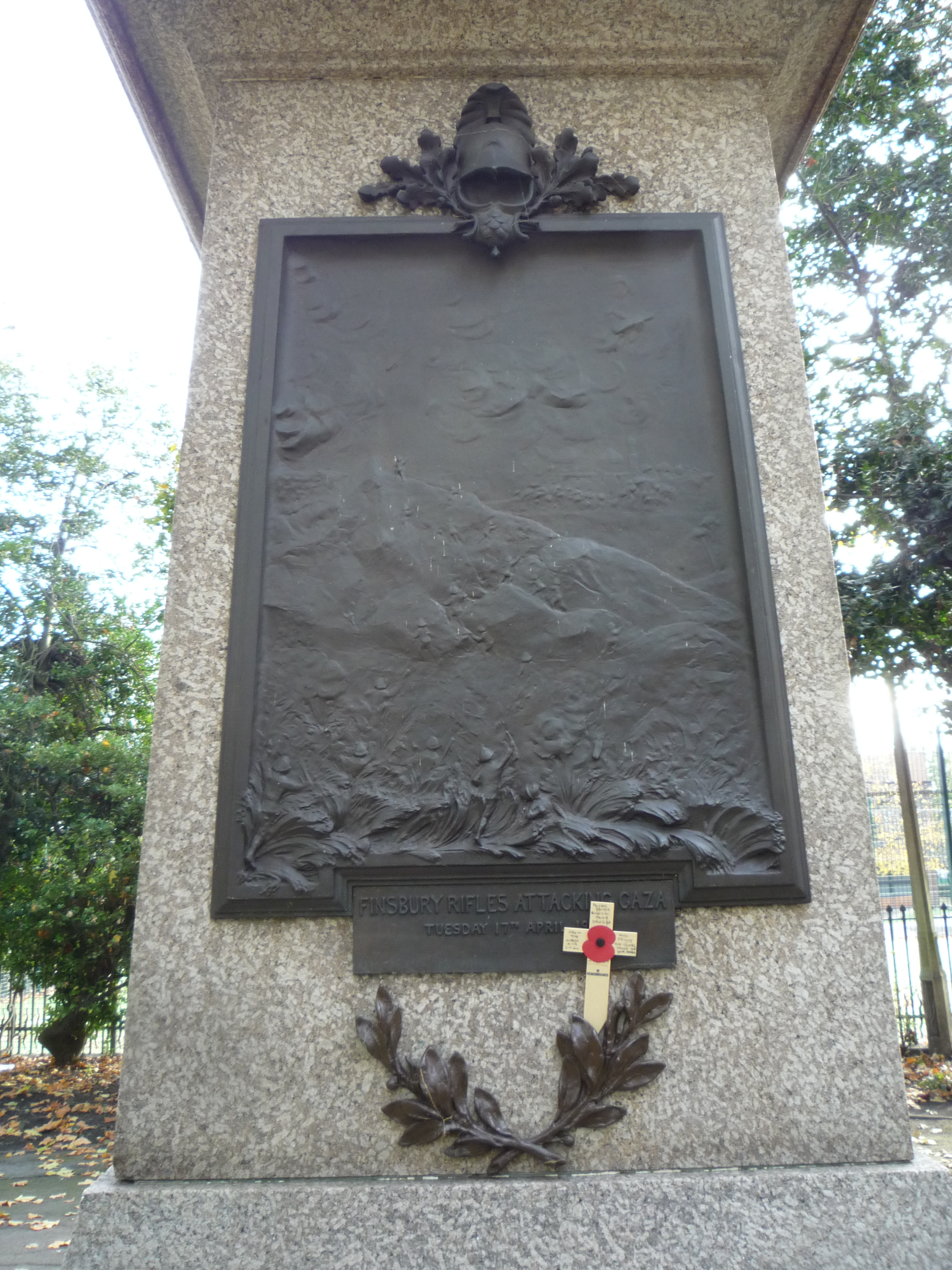
"Finsbury Rifles attacking Gaza, Tuesday 17th April 1917"; panel on Finsbury War Memorial, Spa Green, Clerkenwell.

By mid-January 1917, 54th Division had been concentrated at Moascar for the start of the Sinai and Palestine Campaign. After a difficult crossing of the Sinai Desert, the division closed up to join the EEF's attack on Gaza. 162nd Brigade had only a peripheral part in the First Battle of Gaza (26–27 March), when 161st (Essex) Brigade took the objective but due to confusion was pulled back after dark.

For the Second Battle of Gaza, 54th Division was to advance and then wheel left to attack the Ali Muntar ridge outside Gaza. 162nd Brigade, with 1/11th Londons as support battalion, formed the division's left, with its flank on the point where Wadi Mukkademe crossed the Gaza-Beersheba road. The advance began promptly at 07.20 on 19 April, but it soon became clear that the bombardment of the enemy trenches by artillery and naval guns had failed in its effects. The division's leading battalions came under well-directed artillery fire and intense machine gun fire as they approached the trenches. 162nd Brigade attacked towards the trench complex known as 'The Beer' and made the furthest advance but were forced back at the end of the disastrous day.

==== Capture of Gaza ====
The EEF did not make another attempt to take Gaza until November, after months of preparation. As part of the operation to clear the Gaza–Beersheba Line (the Third Battle of Gaza, 27 October–7 November), 54th Division attacked directly towards the town on 2 November. It was a holding attack but the leading brigades made such good progress that 162nd Bde was able to pass through by 06.00 to move on to the final objective, Sheikh Hasan, which it secured after a 15-minute bombardment. The attack was continued on 7 November, with 162nd Bde heading towards Turtle Hill, north west of Gaza town. Supported by powerful artillery, the infantry walked through the defences to find that the Turks had evacuated Gaza. The EEF pursued the defeated Turks back to the Jaffa–Jerusalem defence line, and Jerusalem fell on 7 December.

==== Jaffa ====
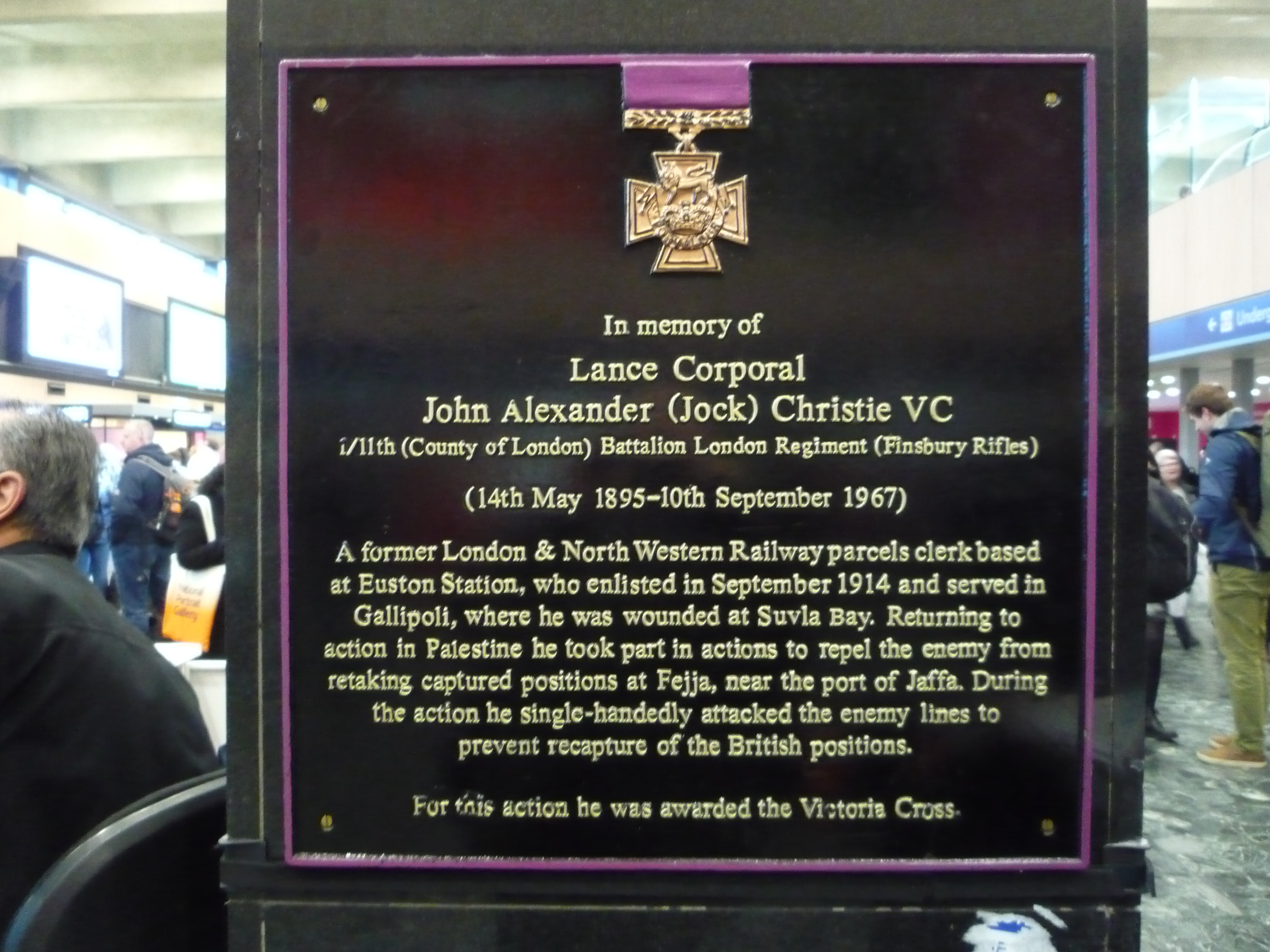
The Jock Christie, VC, memorial at Euston Station.

As a preliminary to the Battle of Jaffa planned for the night of 20/21 December, the 1/11th Londons were ordered to seize a hill from which enfilade fire could be brought onto Bald Hill, 350 yards away and one of the key objectives for the following night's attack. An officer of the supporting artillery described the Finsbury Rifles as 'very short of men and the commanding officer was only a captain, so great had been their losses, but they were very gallant fellows'. Their charge was preceded by a five minute bombardment by three field batteries, during which the enemy put down a counter-barrage along the edge of Bald Hill and manned their trenches. The attack on the other hill therefore came as a surprise, and the 1/11th Bn seized it with little loss, and then held it against three determined counter-attacks in the next two hours. Delivered over open ground, these attacks were easily beaten off by machine gun and rifle fire. Bombing attacks up the trenches were more dangerous, but one such attack was driven off single-handedly by Lance-Corporal John Alexander Christie, who went forward 50 yards from his own line and scattered them with grenades. 'Jock' Christie was awarded the VC.

==== Tell 'Asur ====
The EEF began a new phase of offensive operation in March 1918, the so-called Actions of Tel 'Asur. At dawn on 12 March, 162nd Brigade assaulted behind a creeping barrage, 'The infantry – Londons and Bedfords – were seen to disappear into the wadis in the pale light and then to reappear scrambling up the steep hillsides like lines of ants'.

Having occupied a much better line, the 54th Division settled down to a defensive routine. The next operation began on 9 April at Berukin, but 162nd Bde's planned attack on 14 April was cancelled at the last moment. 54th Division was now warned to prepare to move to reinforce the BEF on the Western Front following its defeats during the German spring offensive. This move was however cancelled in July, and the EEF reorganised for operations in the autumn to complete the Turkish defeat.

==== Megiddo ====
The culminating Battle of Megiddo began with the Battle of Sharon. On the opening day, 19 September, the 1/11th Londons were assigned to escort the divisional artillery and cover the gap between the 54th Division and the 3rd (Lahore) Division while the rest of 162nd Bde made a difficult attack alongside the Essex Brigade. The Turks quickly collapsed, and as the Desert Mounted Corps pursued them to Aleppo the infantry of 54th Division were left far behind. By the time the division reached Beirut at the end of October, hostilities were brought to an end by the Armistice of Mudros.

The battalion was reduced to cadre strength in Egypt on 6 July 1919 and afterwards demobilised, the personnel being shipped home.

=== 2/11th Battalion ===
The 2/11th Londons joined 2/3rd London Brigade at Crowborough in November 1914. The 2/1st London Division concentrated in East Anglia round Ipswich in August 1915, and was numbered as 58th (2/1st London) Division; the 2/11th Londons were in 175th (2/3rd London) Brigade. Although the division formed part of First Army of Central Force, no serious training could be undertaken because of lack of equipment. At first the only small arms available were .256-in Japanese Ariska rifles. In the Spring of 1916 the division took over a sector of the East Coast defences, digging many trenches, with 2/11th Londons at Bromeswell Heath, near Woodbridge, Suffolk. Finally, the division received Lee-Enfield service rifles and on 10 July 1916 it concentrated around Sutton Veny for final training on Salisbury Plain, with 2/11th Londons at Longbridge Deverill.

==== France ====
In January 1917 the 58th Division moved to Southampton and began embarkin for France, landing at Le Havre. The 175th Bde was the last to arrive, on 4 February, and the division eventually concentrated at Lucheux on 8 February. The battalions were introduced to trench warfare by companies, being attached to battalions of the 46th (North Midland) and 49th (West Riding) Divisions. From March to April the 58th Division followed up the German retreat to the Hindenburg Line and was then put to work to repair the roads and railways destroyed by the retreating enemy.

==== Bullecourt ====
The 58th Division's first offensive operation was a peripheral part in the Second Battle of Bullecourt (4–17 May), for which 175th Bde was attached to 2nd Australian Division. On 17 May the 2/11th Bn provided two companies to act as stretcher bearers, suffering 30 casualties in so doing. For the next few weeks the division was engaged in small actions against the Hindenburg Line, and then went into a period of intensive battle training in old German trenches. 175th Brigade was then assigned to railway construction at Achiet-le-Grand near Arras.

==== Ypres ====
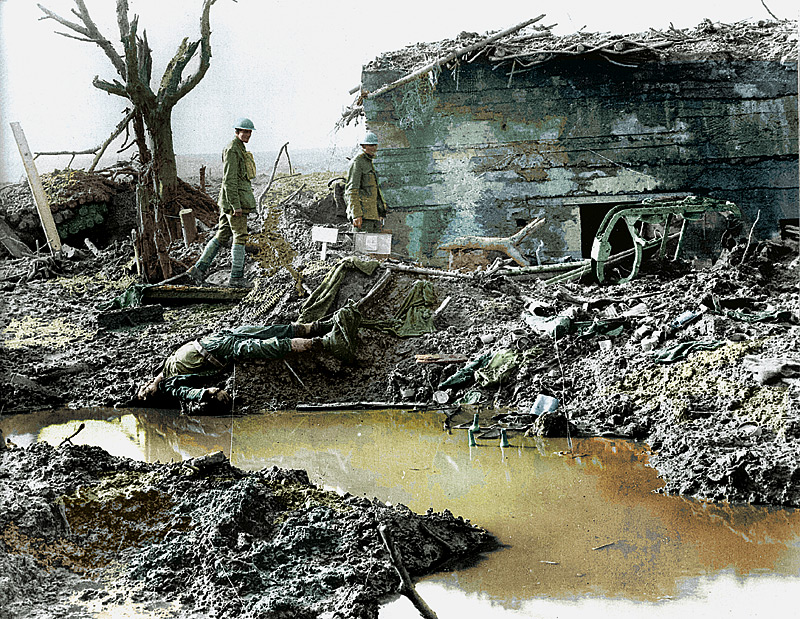
Captured German pillbox or 'Mebu' at Passchendaele

After a period of trench holding near Arras, the 58th Division moved to the Ypres Salient in late August 1917, with 2/11th Battalion being one of the first units going into the line, taking over positions at St Julien. To minimise casualties, the line was held by a series of outposts.

In the attack of 20 September (the Battle of the Menin Road Ridge), 2/11th Battalion was in reserve with 175th Brigade. On 23 September, after coming under fire, an SOS was sent up at 7 pm and the enemy counterattack was beaten off. Lieutenant Fraser was wounded and 10 other ranks were killed. Captain A.C. Soutten captured six prisoners of the 100th Infantry regiment single handed. 175th Brigade led the division's attack at the Battle of Polygon Wood (26 September), with 2/11th Battalion in support. Afterwards the 58th Division went into reserve.

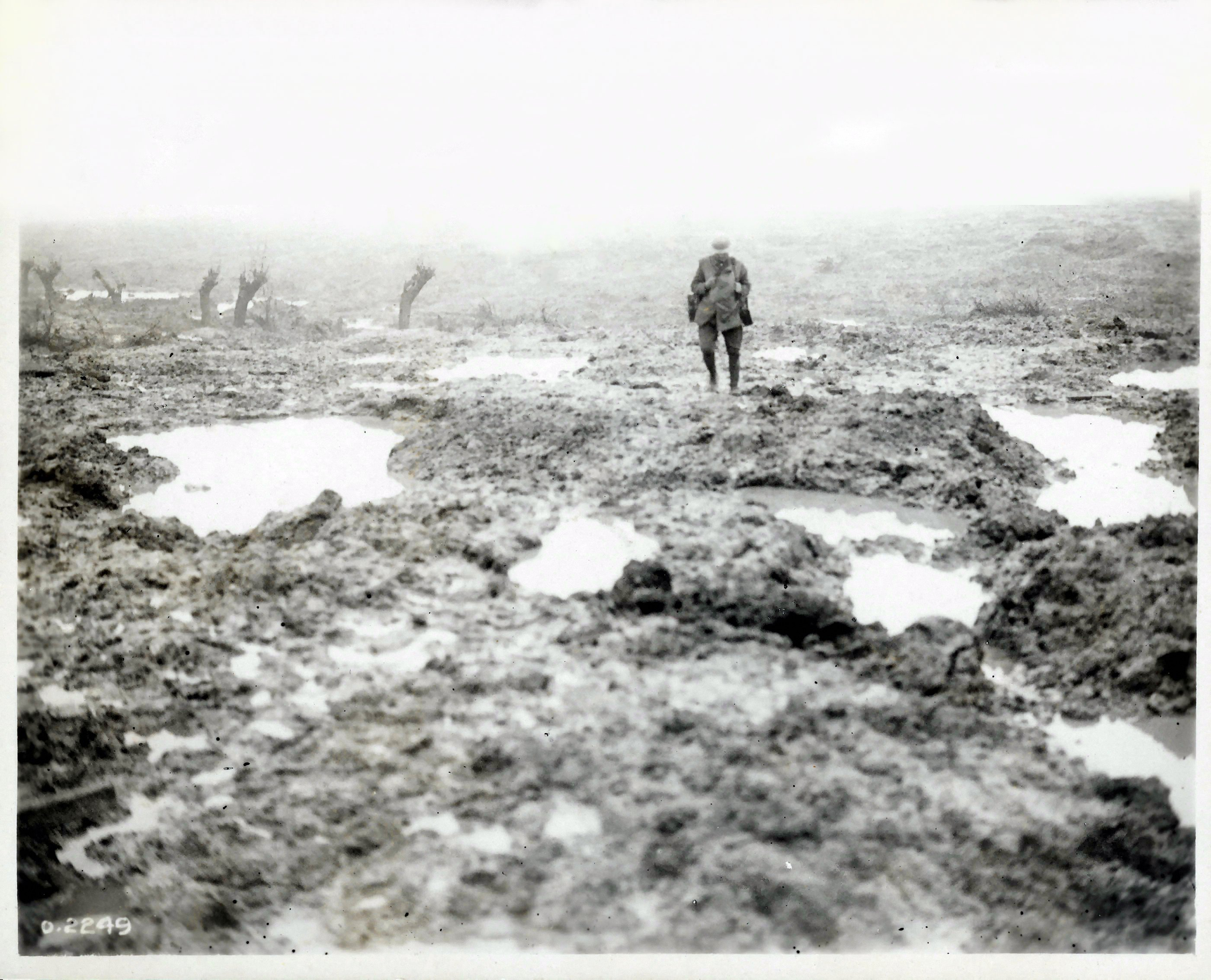
Passchendaele mud

The division returned to the line for the Second Battle of Passchendaele (26 October). As it arrived, the weather broke, and the division was forced to jump off from a line of flooded craters in the Poelcapelle area and struggle forward behind a barrage that advanced too quickly. 2/11th Battalion was one of those sent up immediately afterwards to relieve the exhausted attackers.

By now the BEF was suffering a serious manpower crisis and roughly a quarter of its infantry battalions were disbanded. The 2/11th Battalion was one of those chosen, and it was disbanded between 31 January and 6 February 1918. The men were drafted to the 1/20th, 1/21st and 1/22nd Bns London Regiment in 47th (2nd London) Division).

=== 3/11th Battalion ===
A reserve battalion was formed at Tadworth in Surrey on 17 April 1915 and designated the 3/11th. It trained on Epsom Downs before moving to winter billets in Sutton in October 1915. It moved to Fovant in the Salisbury Plain training area in January 1916. The unit was redesignated the 11th Reserve Bn, London Regiment, in the 1st London Reserve Group on 8 April, and absorbed by the 9th Reserve Bn on 1 September 1916. Throughout the war it trained recruits and prepared them for drafting to the service battalions overseas.

=== 31st Londons ===
The remaining Home Service men of the TF were separated when the 3rd Line battalions were raised in May 1915, and were formed into Provisional Battalions for home defence. The men of the Finsbury Rifles joined with those from the 13th (Kensington), 15th (London Scottish) and 16th (Queen's Westminsters) Battalions of London Regiment, to for 105th Provisional Bn at Frinton-on-Sea in Essex. It joined 7th Provisional Brigade in the defences of East Anglia.

The Military Service Act 1916 swept away the Home/Foreign service distinction, and all TF soldiers became liable for overseas service, if medically fit. The Provisional Brigades thus became anomalous, and their units became numbered battalions of their parent units. On 1 January 1917 105th Provisional Bn was absorbed into 107th Provisional Battalion (formed from the Home Service men of the 17th (Poplar & Stepney Rifles), 18th (London Irish Rifles) and 21st (1st Surrey Rifles) Bns, London Regiment to become 31st (County of London) Battalion, London Regiment, in 226th Mixed Bde, attached to 71st Division from 13 April 1917. By May 1917 the battalion was at St Osyth in Essex. Part of the role of the former provisional units was physical conditioning to render men fit for drafting overseas, and as men were drafted the 31st Londons was run down, and it was disbanded on 7 September 1917.

== Interwar ==
The TF was reconstituted on 7 February 1920 and reorganised as the Territorial Army (TA) in 1921. The London Regiment had been in abeyance since 1916, so its battalions were designated as regiments in their own right, the Finsbury Rifles becoming 11th London Regiment (Finsbury Rifles), once again affiliated to the KRRC, but now in 142nd (6th London) Brigade of 47th (2nd London) Division.

In 1935 the increasing need for anti-aircraft (AA) defence, particularly for London, was addressed by converting the 47th (2nd London) Division into the 1st Anti-Aircraft Division. A number of London infantry battalions were also converted to the AA role, the 11th Londons being transferred to the Royal Artillery (RA) on 15 December 1935 as 61st (Finsbury Rifles) Anti-Aircraft Brigade, Royal Artillery), with the following organisation:

- HQ at Pentonville
- 170 AA Battery at Finchley
- 171 AA Battery at Pentonville
- 195 AA Battery at Finchley (raised by April 1938)
- AA Machine Gun Battery at Pentonville (redesignated 224 Light Anti-Aircraft (LAA) Battery in 1937)

Despite their transfer to the RA, the personnel continued to wear their Finsbury Rifles cap badge. The 61st AA Bde formed part of 28th (Thames and Medway) Anti-Aircraft Group of 1 AA Division, but in May 1938 it joined a new 37th AA Bde based in North London.

The TA's AA units were mobilised on 23 September 1938 during the Munich Crisis, with units manning their emergency positions within 24 hours, even though many did not yet have their full complement of men or equipment. The emergency lasted three weeks, and they were stood down on 13 October. With the expansion of the TA after the Munich Crisis, most units split to form duplicates. In the case of 61st AA Bde, 224 LAA Bty was expanded into a full regiment in October as 12th (Finsbury Rifles) Light Anti-Aircraft Brigade, Royal Artillery, with 33–35 LAA Btys and a new 44 LAA Bty formed on 16 January 1939, while 61st adopted 'Middlesex' as its subtitle and formed a new 272 Bty at Southgate on 1 November. On formation the new 12th LAA Bde chose to show its ancestral links to the Finsbury Rifles and KRRC by wearing a black KRRC button on the shoulder straps of their tunics and battledress blouses. On 1 January 1939 the RA adopted the more normal designations of 'regiments' for 'brigades'. By April 1939 272 Bty had left 61st AA Rgt to become the basis of a new 90th AA Rgt in 37th AA Bde.

== Second World War ==
=== Mobilisation ===
In February 1939 the existing AA defences came under the control of a new Anti-Aircraft Command and 37th AA Brigade was transferred to a new 6th AA Division in May. In June a partial mobilisation of TA units was begun in a process known as 'couverture', whereby each AA unit did a month's tour of duty in rotation to man selected AA positions. On 24 August, ahead of the declaration of war, AA Command was fully mobilised at its war stations.

=== 61st (Middlesex) HAA Regiment ===
37th AA Brigade operated a layout of gun sites from Dagenham to Thorpe Bay in Essex, along the north side of the Thames Estuary, known as 'Thames North'. Opportunities for action were rare during the Phoney War, but on the night of 22/23 November 1939 the Thames North guns combined with those of 28 AA Bde on the other bank of the river ('Thames South') to engage at least two enemy mine-laying aircraft that had strayed into the mouth of the Estuary. One wrecked aircraft was found on the marshes.

On 1 June 1940 the RA's AA regiments equipped with 3-inch or 3.7-inch guns were redesignated Heavy AA (HAA) to distinguish them from the newer LAA regiments.

==== Battle of Britain ====
By 11 July 1940, the Thames North AA layout operated by 37 AA Bde had a total of 46 HAA guns (3.7-inch and even 4.5-inch). The brigade was heavily engaged throughout the Battle of Britain On 22 August, for example, a mass raid flew up the Thames Estuary to attack RAF Hornchurch on the Essex shore: the raid was broken up by 37 and 28 AA Bdes, and then the fighters of No. 11 Group RAF attacked. Follow-up raids were marked for the fighters by 'pointer' rounds of HAA fire. On 2 September another mass raid arrived over the Medway and flew up the Thames towards Hornchurch. They came under heavy fire from the 3.7s and 4.5s of 28 and 37 AA Bdes and 15 were shot down before the fighters took over. On 7 September heavy raids up the estuary attacked oil wharves at Thameshaven, Tilbury Docks and Woolwich Arsenal: a total of 25 aircraft were destroyed by AA guns and fighters.

On 15 September, remembered as the climax of the battle, 220 bombers attacked London in the morning despite heavy casualties inflicted by the RAF fighters. More attacks came in the afternoon and the AA guns around London, particularly Thames North, were continuously in action. Between the guns and fighters, the Luftwaffe lost 85 aircraft that day, an unsustainable rate of loss.

==== The Blitz ====
After 15 September the intensity of Luftwaffe day raids declined rapidly, and it began a prolonged night bombing campaign over London and industrial towns (The Blitz). This meant that the Thames North guns were in action night after night as the bomber streams approached the London Inner Artillery Zone, but even with the assistance of searchlights, the effectiveness of HAA fire and fighters was greatly diminished in the darkness. 61st HAA Regiment served throughout this period.

==== Iraq ====
61st HAA Regiment was next selected to be sent to the Middle East. It left AA Command in September and by 8 December 1941 it was in 8th AA Bde in Tenth Army in Iraq and Persia. Tenth Army was being built up to counter the threat from air raids on the vital oil installations if the German Army on the Eastern Front penetrated into the Caucasus. The tasks allotted to 8th AA Bde were defence of the Basra base area, RAF Habbaniya, Mosul and the oil installations at Kirkuk. These widely spread Gun Defence Areas (GDAs) generally received one HAA battery and one LAA battery each.

The German threat to the Persian oilfields never materialised, but Tenth Army found a secondary role in acclimatising units before they went on active service in North Africa. Hence 61st HAA Rgt left 8th AA Bde in March 1942 to move to Middle East Forces (MEF) in Egypt to bolster the AA defences of the Suez Canal.

==== Egypt ====
In April, RHQ 61st HAA Rgt with its signal section, Royal Corps of Signals, and Royal Army Ordnance Corps workshop was ordered down from Tell El Kebir in the Nile Delta to Suez, arriving on 21 May. During the summer the regiment took charge of all HAA batteries on the eastern side of the canal at the Suez end under 89th (Cinque Ports) HAA Rgt, whose CO was AA Defence Commander (AADC), Suez. These 3.7-inch gun sites were manned by 170 and 171 Btys of 61st HAA Rgt, together with 5 HAA Bty, Royal Malta Artillery manning two 4.5-inch guns and Z Battery rocket projectors.

By September 1942, with Rommel's Panzerarmee Afrika at El Alamein, just 66 miles (106 km) from Alexandria, Luftwaffe reconnaissance raids over Suez Bay and the docks and oil refinery at Port Tewfik became common. Later that month, 61st HAA Rgt was relieved at Suez and in October, at the time of the Second Battle of El Alamein, it was part of 17th AA Bde, assigned to Eighth Army and held in reserve for the breakthrough and advance into Libya.

In January 1943, as Eighth Army swept westwards, 17th AA Bde, including 61st HAA with all three of its batteries, was defending the port of Tobruk and its airfields at El Adem and Gambut. It was still in these positions in May when the Tunisian Campaign ended.

==== Sicily ====
61st HAA Regiment was not involved in the assault phase of the Allied invasion of Sicily (Operation Husky) (see below), but moved to the island when it became the base for the Allied invasion of Italy in September 1943. RHQ, 170 Bty and half of 171 Bty, with a total of 12 3.7-inch guns, were under 73rd AA Bde defending the ferry port of Milazzo. By January 1944 the regiment, now at full strength, was defending the port of Augusta.

==== Italy ====
61st HAA Regiment crossed to mainland Italy in September 1944 and joined 25 AA Bde, which was responsible for defending the ports of Bari, Barletta, Brindisi and Manfredonia in Apulia. Bari in particular had continued to attract attention from Luftwaffe night bombers after the disastrous raid of December 1943. 25th AA Brigade HQ was relieved of its tasks in south east Italy in December 1944, and 61st HAA Rgt came under the command of 22nd AA Bde.

The long static spell was broken by the Allied breakthrough in April 1945. 61st HAA Regiment was sent across Italy to join 66th AA Bde (in which 12th (Finsbury Rifles) LAA Rgt was serving in an infantry and field artillery role, see below). The brigade was sent 100 miles north to defend Genoa, and it was AA advance parties who actually captured the city with little difficulty. Early in May the requirement for AA defence ended when the Surrender of Caserta came into force.

Regimental HQ with 171 and 195 HAA Btys was placed in suspended animation on 1 September 1945; 170 HAA Bty followed on 27 October.

=== 12th (Finsbury Rifles) LAA Regiment ===
On the outbreak of war this regiment was in London District, but shortly afterwards was assigned to a new 56th Light AA Bde. This was formed in 6th AA Division on 30 September 1939 with responsibility for defending airfields in South East England.

==== 44 (Finsbury Rifles) LAA Battery ====
On 15 February 1940, 44 LAA Bty went to Fleet, Hampshire, France to help form a new 101 LAA/Anti-Tank Rgt for 1st Support Group in 1st Armoured Division with the BEF. It sailed for France on 16 May when the Battle of France had already begun. It immediately went into action to hold crossings over the Seine until the tanks arrived, though the LAA batteries only had Lewis gunss. It took part in the Battle of Abbeville and then, when the bulk of the BEF had been evacuated from Dunkirk the remnants of the Support Group fought on until they were evacuated from western France in Operation Aerial (15–17 June). 101st LAA/AT Rgt was broken up in November 1940, but 44 LAA Bty did not return to its parent unit. Instead it joined a new 61st LAA Rg in 1st Support Group, with which it fought in North Africa.

Meanwhile, the rest of 12th LAA Rgt was serving in 6th AA Bde in 6th AA Division, responsible for AA defence of RAF airfields in Essex during the Battle of Britain and early part of the Blitz. By May 1941 it was in 60th AA Bde in 8th AA Division, responsible for covering Yeovil, Exeter and Portland.

==== Middle East ====
In March 1942 the regiment began the two-month voyage to the Middle East, joining 8th Anti-Aircraft Brigade of the British Tenth Army in Iraq in May. In September it transferred to Persia and Iraq Command (PAIFORCE), and then in May 1943 it moved on to Middle East Force (MEF) in Egypt. From there it joined the British Eighth Army in Tunisia, where it was preparing for the invasion of Sicily (Operation Husky).

==== Operation Husky ====
For the assault landing on 10 July 1943, all three of 12th LAA Rgt's batteries were assigned to Beach Groups in XXX Corps's sector. Beach Groups consisted of a mixture of sub-units from different Arms and Services to secure, defend and control the landing points over which the assault units would pass. Each beach group was allotted one HAA and one LAA battery, commanded by a small AA HQ in radio contact with a control ship. The AA batteries landed with a minimum scale of men and equipment. The gunners went ashore as infantry, prepared for a firefight before moving to the sites selected for gun positions.

There was only light opposition to the assault on Eighth Army's front, and most of the beach groups were established at their designated gun sites or alternatives by the time the guns arrived four hours later. During the morning the Luftwaffe began attacking the beaches and shipping with high-level bombing and low-level machine-gunning, and the LAA batteries were very active. 34 Battery of 12th LAA Rgt shot down two aircraft in the morning, but the LAA gunners were hampered by the lack of early warning radar and by having unsuitable radio receivers. Over the next two days the AA HQs and the batteries' equipment came ashore, but confusion continued and there were many cases of 'friendly fire' incidents against Allied aircraft over the beaches.

Eighth Army captured Catania on 5 August, and the AA units moved up behind it to defend the airfields. 12th LAA Rgt defended Catania under 73rd AA Bde, with 34 Bty detached to Comiso under 62nd AA Bde. By mid-September, when Eighth Army launched Operation Baytown to cross the Straits of Messina onto mainland Italy, 34 Bty had rejoined RHQ at Catania, while 36 Bty had been pushed forward to Messina. During the early stages of the fighting on the mainland 12th LAA Rgt remained in the area of Messina and Milazzo alongside 61st HAA Rgt under 73rd AA Bde.

By January 1944, when Sicily was merely a rear base, 12th LAA Rgt was alongside 61st HAA Rgt at Augusta, with 34 Bty detached to Palermo.

==== Italy ====
The regiment landed in Italy later in 1944. After the breakout from the Anzio beachhead and the capture of Rome in June, it joined 66th AA Bde supporting the advance of the US Fifth Army up the west coast to Livorno. The brigade then remained in the area between Livorno and Florence for the winter, in heavy rain, flooding and snow. The tasks were limited to the AA defence of the port of Livorno (HAA and LAA) and five airfields (LAA only). By now there was a severe frontline manpower shortage and an excess of AA units, so several regiments including 12th LAA began re-training as infantry. At one point 12th LAA formed a troop armed with US 75mm pack howitzers.

In April 1945, 66th AA Bde moved on to Genoa (see above). At the end of the war 12th LAA Rgt became a holding regiment on 22 November 1945, with A to D Btys, before being placed in suspended animation at RAF Gosfield, Essex, on 14 April 1946.

== Postwar ==
In 1947 both regiments were reformed in the reconstituted TA.

61st HAA Regiment became 461st (Middlesex) Heavy Anti-Aircraft Regiment, RA, with HQ at Finchley, forming part of 63 AA Bde (the former 37th AA Bde). However, when AA Command was disbanded on 10 March 1955, the regiment was ordered into 'suspended animation'. This was soon changed to total disbandment, which was completed by July that year.

12th LAA Regiment became 512th (Finsbury Rifles) Light Anti-Aircraft Regiment, RA, with its HQ at Pentonville, forming part of 52 (London) AA Bde (the former 26th (London) AA Bde. It survived the disbandment of AA Command, instead merging with 568 (St Pancras) (Mixed) LAA/Searchlight Regiment and 656 (Tower Hamlets) HAA Regiment to form 512 LAA Regiment:

- P (Finsbury Rifles) Battery
- Q (St Pancras) Battery
- R (Tower Hamlets) Battery.

The new regiment was in 33 AA Bde (the wartime 63rd AA Bde). Another round of mergers in 1961 saw P and R Batteries amalgamate with 459 (Essex Regiment) HAA Regiment and 517 LAA (formerly 7th and 5th Bns Essex Regiment respectively) to form a new 300 (Tower Hamlets) Light Air Defence Regiment, when the Finsbury Rifles lineage ended.

== Insignia ==
The 35th Middlesex RVC adopted the Rifle green uniform with red facings and black buttons of the KRRC.

Despite their transfer to the RA in 1935, the regiment's personnel continued to wear their Finsbury Rifles cap badges. On formation 12th LAA Rgt chose to show its ancestral links to the Finsbury Rifles and KRRC by wearing a black KRRC button on the shoulder straps of tunics and battledress blouses.

During the Second World War, the 61st HAA Rgt bore an embroidered arm title '61 MIDDX RA' in gold on maroon, worn on the sleeve of the battledress blouse.

== Honorary Colonels ==
The following served as Honorary Colonels of the Finsbury Rifles:

- Col Henry Penton (1817–1882; see above)
- Capt Frederick Thomas Penton, MP (1851–1929; son of Henry Penton)
- William Compton, 6th Marquess of Northampton, DSO, appointed 15 December 1923
- Maj Cyril Frederick Penton (1886–1960; younger son of F.T. Penton), appointed Hon Col of 11th Londons and later 12th (Finsbury Rifles) LAA on 23 May 1935
- Sir Howard Button, appointed Hon Col of 61st (Middlesex) HAA on 27 August 1938.

== Prominent members ==
- Field Marshal Lord Harding (1896–1989), commissioned as a TF 2nd Lt on 15 May 1914, transferred to the Regular Army during the First World War.
- Lance-Corporal John Alexander Christie (1895–1967), enlisted September 1914, won the VC in Palestine.

== Battle Honours ==
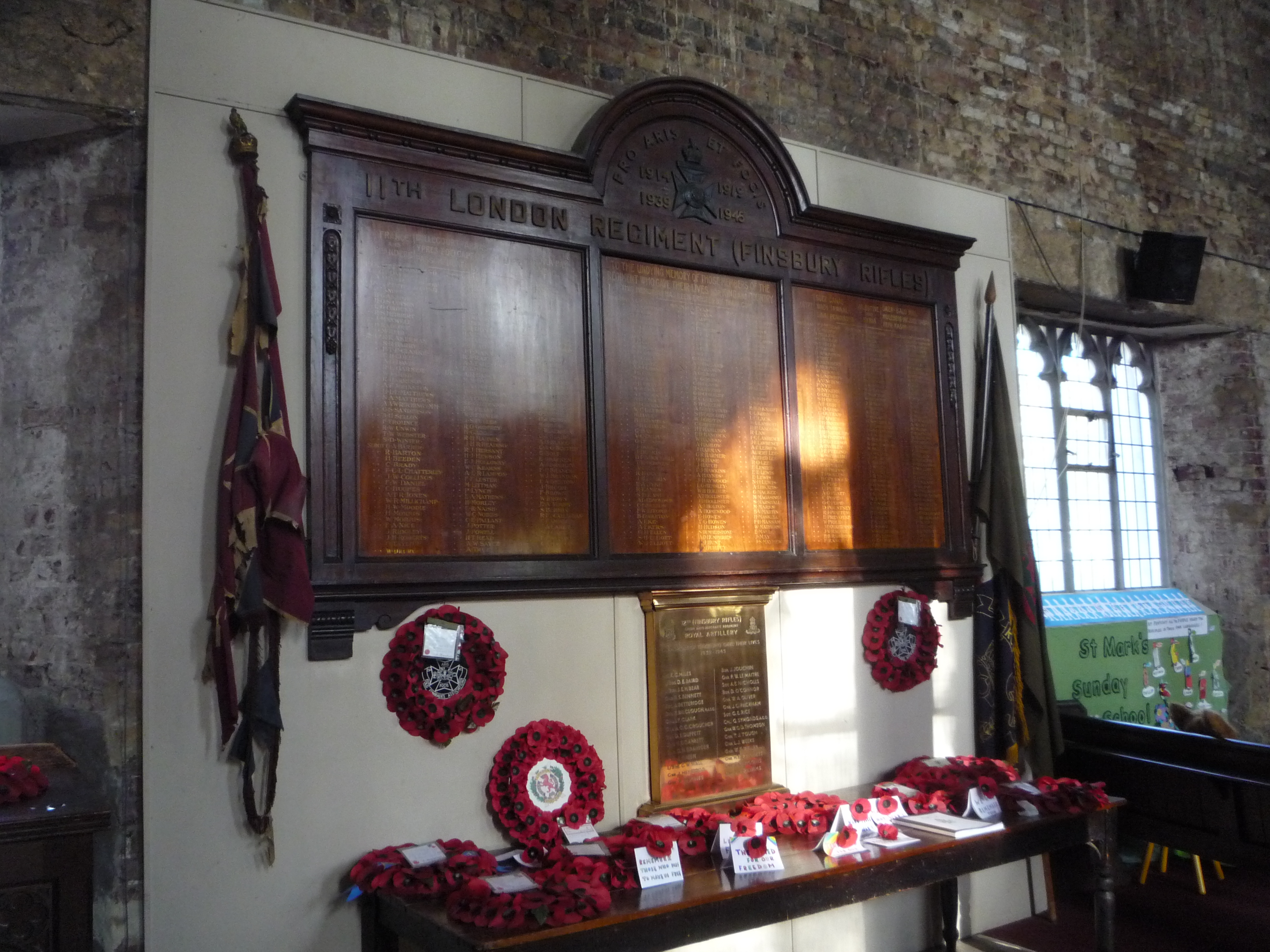
The Finsbury Rifles war memorial in St Mark's Myddelton Square

The Finsbury Rifles were awarded the following Battle Honours (those listed in Bold Type were chosen to appear on the regimental appointments): South Africa 1900–02.

First World War: Bullecourt, Ypres 1917, Menin Road, Polygon Wood, Passchendaele, France and Flanders 1917–18, Suvla, Landing at Suvla, Scimitar Hill, Gallipoli 1915, Egypt 1915–17, Gaza, El Mughar, Nebi Samwil, Jerusalem, Jaffa, Tell 'Asur, Megiddo, Sharon, Palestine 1917–18.

The Royal Artillery does not carry battle honours, so none were awarded to 61st HAA Rgt or 12th LAA Rgt for the Second World War.

== Memorials ==
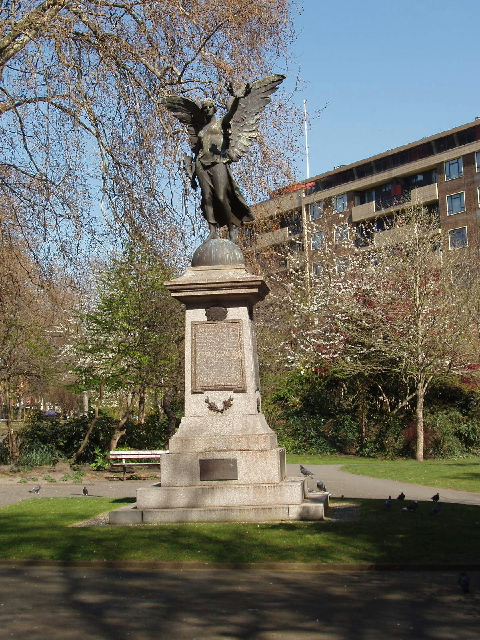
Finsbury War Memorial

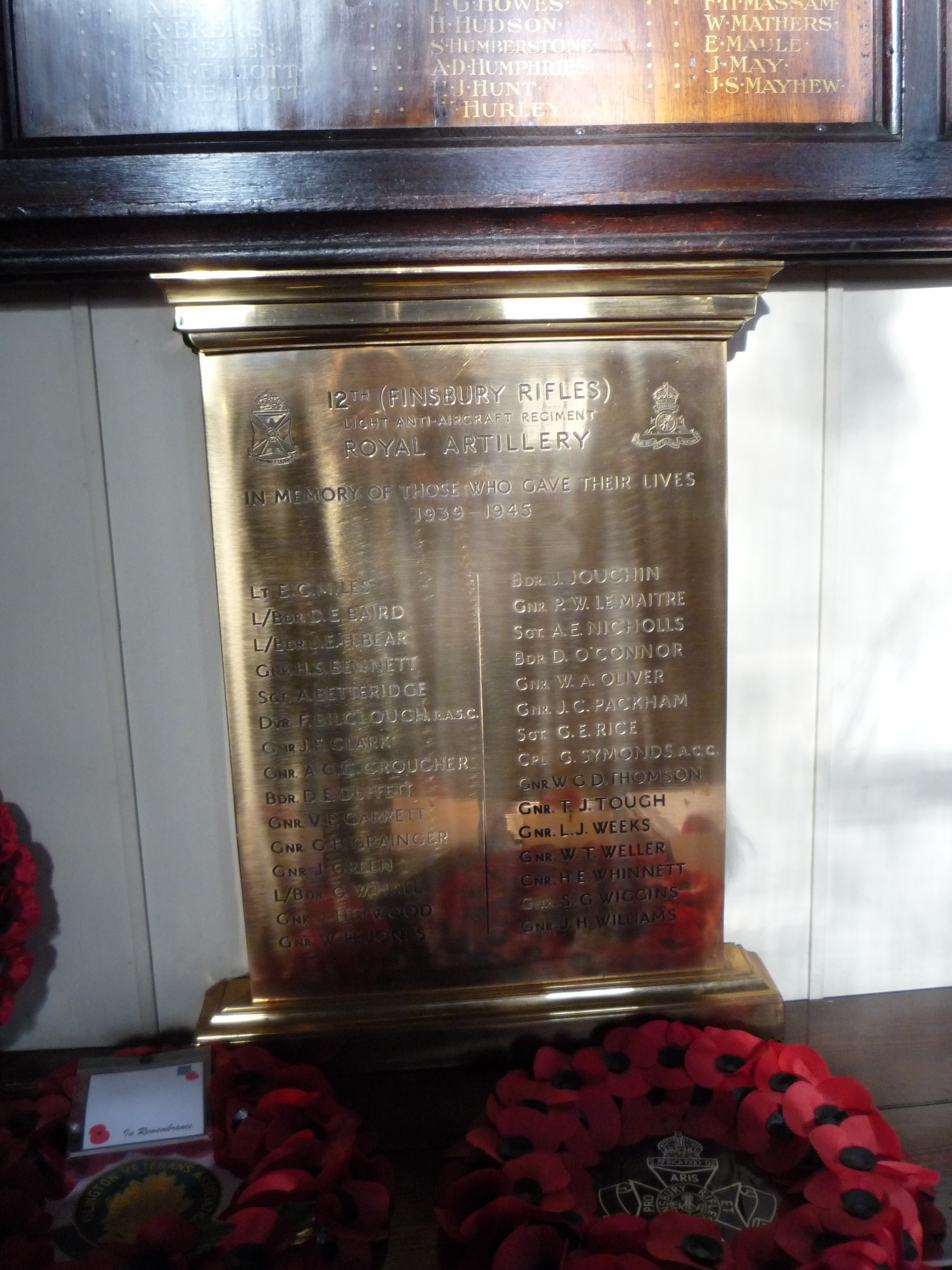
The brass panel added to the Finsbury Rifles' memorial to commemorate the 12th LAA Rgt

The 11th Londons (Finsbury Rifles) and 12th (Finsbury Rifles) LAA war memorials are in St Mark's, Myddelton Square, Clerkenwell.

A bronze panel on the Finsbury War Memorial depicts the Finsbury Rifles at Gaza. The memorial is in Spa Green Garden at the junction of Rosebery Avenue and Gloucester Way.

The regiment is one of those whose titles are inscribed on the City and County of London Troops Memorial in front of the Royal Exchange, London, with architectural design by Sir Aston Webb and sculpture by Alfred Drury. The right-hand (southern) bronze figure flanking this memorial depicts an infantryman representative of the various London infantry units.

A memorial plaque to Jock Christie, VC, was unveiled on 28 March 2014 at Euston Station where he had worked as a parcels clerk for the London and North Western Railway.
