= Paddington Rifles =

36th Middlesex Rifle Volunteers (Paddington Rifles) 10th (County of London) Battalion, London Regiment (Paddington)
- Active: 1860–1912
- Country: United Kingdom
- Branch: Territorial Army
- Type: Infantry
- Size: Battalion
- Part of: London Regiment
- Garrison/HQ: Greville House (1869–1896); Harrow Road drill hall (1896–1912)

The Paddington Rifles was a unit of the Territorial Army.

== Origin ==
The enthusiasm for the Volunteer movement following an invasion scare in 1859 saw the creation of many Rifle, Artillery and Engineer Volunteer units composed of part-time soldiers eager to supplement the Regular British Army in time of need. One such unit was the Paddington Rifles, raised at Hermitage Street, Paddington, on 29 February 1860, which became the 36th Middlesex Rifle Volunteers (Paddington Rifles). Major-General David Downing (1802–88), late of the Bengal Army, became the unit's first commanding officer (CO). In line with the Volunteers' raison d'etre, the Paddington Rifles adopted the motto 'Arm for Peace'.

The unit had two companies on parade at the first Volunteer Review held in Hyde Park in 1860, with recruitment for a third well under way. Soon afterwards the Paddington Rifles had four companies, a cadet corps and a drum and bugle band. Headquarters was at the Vestry Hall of St Mary's Church, Paddington Green, with weapons stored and drills carried out at the Hermitage Street Fire Station across Harrow Road. The Corps also had the use of two riding schools, Pearce's in Westbourne Grove and Gapp's in Gloucester Terrace.

After undergoing 30 recruit drills in their first 18 months in the unit, the basic annual requirement for Volunteers was to attend six company drills, three battalion drills and the annual inspection, but many enthusiastic volunteers did far more than this, In July 1861 the 36th Middlesex RVC held morning and evening drills every weekday leading up to that year's grand Volunteer Review on Wimbledon Common. Discipline was, however, often lacking, and in December 1860 Maj-Gen Downing, had to appeal to his men to avoid insubordination. The following year he was openly criticised in the Paddington Newsman by his own officers. His successor, Lt-Col William Wood (late Royal Marines), appointed 12 March 1861, received the same treatment in the Paddington Times in April 1868. On 22 July 1869, Wood became Honorary Colonel of the unit and was replaced as CO by Gordon Maynard Ives (later Girdon-Ives) of Bentworth Hall (1837–1907), formerly of the Coldstream Guards.

In 1868 a boy was killed on the unit's rifle range.

== Expansion ==
In 1869 the Vestry Hall began to be converted into Paddington Town Hall, and the Rifles had to find a temporary HQ above the 'King and Queen' public house in Harrow Road. Later it moved across Paddington Green into Greville House. By 1870 the unit had at least seven companies, with No 7 Company at Kensal Green being made up mainly from employees of the Metropolitan Railway.

In 1880 there was a reorganisation of the RVCs and the unit was renumbered as the 18th Middlesex Rifle Volunteer Corps (Paddington Rifles), consisting of 12 companies. Under the Childers Reforms of 1881 it became the 5th (later 4th) Volunteer Bn of the Rifle Brigade, without changing its title. It remained a 'Middlesex' unit even after its recruiting area became part of the new County of London in 1889.

The Stanhope Memorandum of December 1888 introduced a Mobilisation Scheme for Volunteer units, which would assemble in their own brigades at key points in case of war. In peacetime these brigades provided a structure for collective training. The Paddington Rifles formed part of the North London Brigade.

The continued expansion of the battalion – transport and ambulance sections had been added – led to overcrowding at Greville House, and in 1895 the unit acquired property at 207–9 Harrow Road with sufficient land to build a drill hall and rifle range. It moved into this new HQ on 31 March 1896.

During the Second Boer War the battalion formed a service company of volunteers to serve alongside the Regulars, earning the Battle honour South Africa 1900–1902. Other members, including the second-in-command, Lt-Col A.G. Pawle, served with the City Imperial Volunteers (CIV).

Freemasons within the unit formed their own Masonic lodge (Paddington Rifles No 2807) in 1900.

== Territorial Force ==
When the Volunteers were subsumed into the Territorial Force (TF) under the Haldane Reforms in 1908, all of the Volunteer Battalions in the Central London area became part of the all-Territorial London Regiment and were numbered sequentially through the London brigades and divisions, with the Paddington Rifles becoming 10th (County of London) Battalion, London Regiment (Paddington) in the 3rd London Brigade in 1st London Division.

== Disbandment ==
In later years the battalion suffered from poor recruitment, and it failed to meet its required establishment. As a result, the Paddington Rifles was disbanded on 31 May 1912 and replaced by a new 10th (County of London) Battalion (Hackney), London Regiment, while the 3rd (City of London) Battalion (Royal Fusiliers) took over its battalion HQ at Harrow Road, and absorbed many of its personnel.

== Uniform ==
From at least 1876 (ie well before it became a Volunteer Battalion of the Rifle Brigade) the Paddington Rifles wore a Rifle green uniform with black facings, and as a rifle unit it was never issued with colours.

== Honorary colonel ==
The following officers served as honorary colonel of the unit:

- Lt-Col William Wood, late Royal Marines, former CO, appointed 22 July 1869.
- Col Gordon Maynard Gordon-Ives, CB, VD, late Coldstream Guards, former CO, appointed 28 March 1889.

The position remained vacant from 1907 until the disbandment of the unit.

== Prominent members ==
- The Hon Alan de Tatton Egerton (later 3rd Baron Egerton was commissioned as a captain in the unit on 2 May 1877.
- Philip Hugh Dalbiac, CB, TD retired Captain in the Sherwood Foresters, was appointed Lieutenant-Colonel Commandant on 3 June 1896. He later commanded the 60th (2/2nd London) Division's Transport and Supply Column in Salonika during World War I
- Hon Col A.G. Pawle, VD, served as second-in-command of the City Imperial Volunteers during the Second Boer War and was Mentioned in dispatches

== Online sources ==
- Land Forces of Britain, the Empire and Commonwealth (Regiments.org – archive site)
