= John Alexander Christie =

English Victoria Cross recipient (1895-1967)

- Born: 14 May 1895; Edmonton, London
- Died: 10 September 1967 (aged 72); Stockport, Cheshire
- Military career
- Allegiance: United Kingdom
- Branch: British Army
- Service years: 1914–1919
- Rank: Lance-Corporal
- Nickname: Jock
- Units: 11th (County of London) Bn London Regiment (Finsbury Rifles)
- Conflicts: World War I
- Awards: Victoria Cross

John Alexander Christie VC (14 May 1895 – 10 September 1967), known as Jock Christie, was an English recipient of the Victoria Cross, the highest and most prestigious award for gallantry in the face of the enemy that can be awarded to British and Commonwealth forces.

== Biography ==
Christie was 22 years old, and a lance-corporal in the 1/11th (County of London) Battalion, (Finsbury Rifles), London Regiment, British Army during the First World War when the following deed took place for which he was awarded the VC.

On 21 December/22 December 1917, at Fejja, Palestine, after a position had been captured, the enemy immediately made counter-attacks up the communication trenches. Lance-Corporal Christie, seeing what was happening, took a supply of bombs and went alone about 50 yards in the open along the communication trench and bombed the enemy. He continued to do this in spite of heavy opposition until a block had been established. On his way back he bombed more of the enemy who were moving up the trench. His prompt action cleared a difficult position at a most difficult time and saved many lives.

His medal is privately held.

== Memorials ==
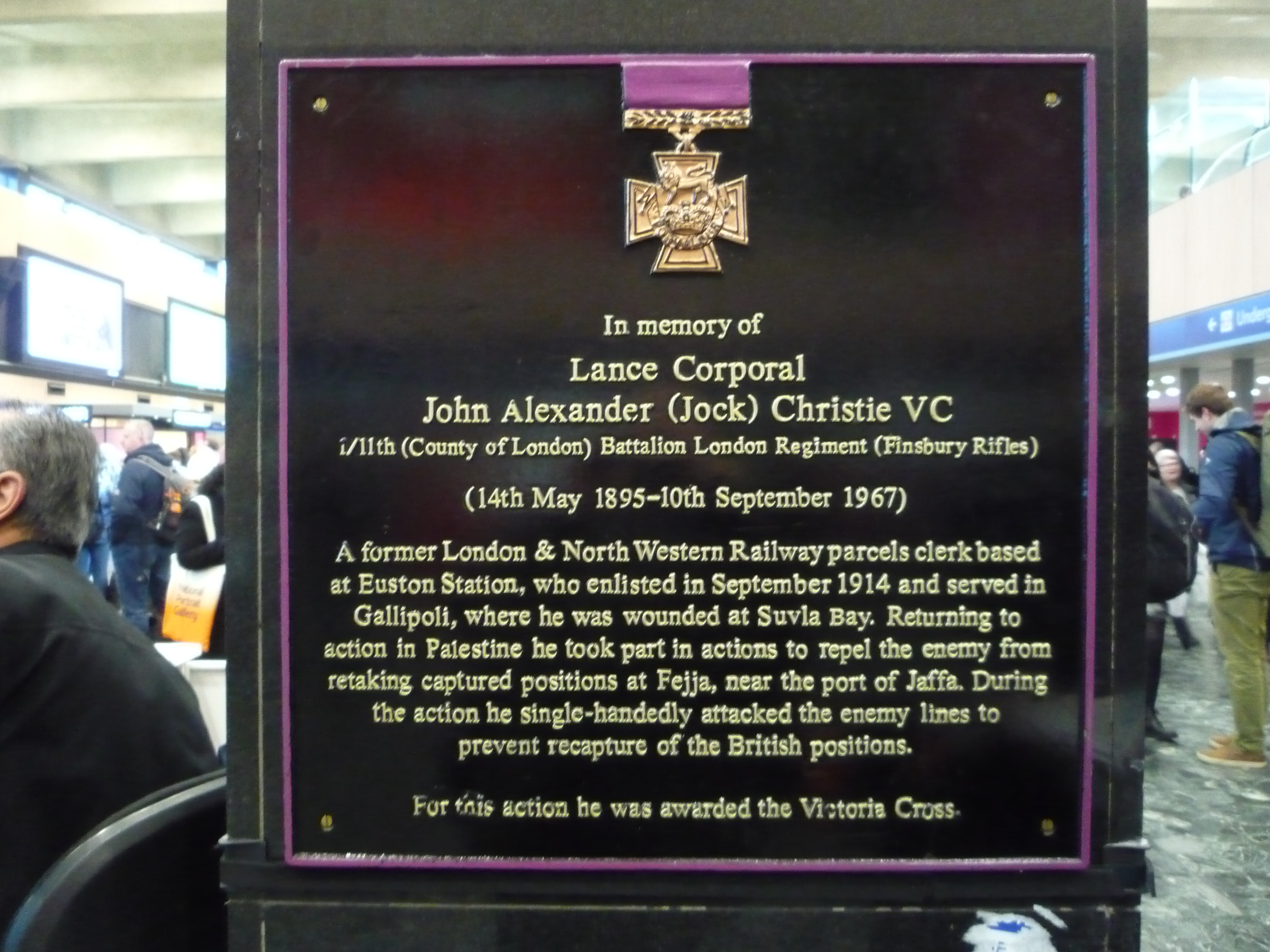
The plaque to Jock Christie at Euston Station

Jock Christie had been a parcels clerk employed by the London and North Western Railway (LNWR) at Euston Station. In 1920 the LNWR named Claughton-class locomotive No. 1407 'L/Cpl J.A. Christie, V.C.' in his honour.

A plaque inside Euston Station commemorating the action of Jock Christie VC was unveiled by his son on 28 March 2014.

There is also a memorial to Christie in Pymmes Park, Edmonton.

== Sources ==
- Monuments to Courage (David Harvey, 1999)
- The Register of the Victoria Cross (This England, 1997)
- Scotland's Forgotten Valour (Graham Ross, 1995)
