= 169th (3rd London) Brigade =

- Active: 1888–1915; 1915–1920; 1920–1940; 1940–1947
- Country: United Kingdom
- Branch: Territorial Army
- Type: Infantry; Motorised infantry
- Size: Brigade
- Part of: 56th (London) Infantry Division
- Nicknames: "The Black Cats" (Second World War, divisional nickname) "The Queen's Brigade"
- Engagements: First World War; Second World War

Commanders
- Notable commanders: Lewis Lyne

The 169th (3rd London) Brigade was an infantry brigade of the British Army that saw active service in both the First and the Second World Wars. Throughout its existence the brigade, serving under numerous many different titles and designations, was an integral part of the 56th (London) Infantry Division. It served on the Western Front in the First World War, and in the North African and Italian campaigns during the Second World War.

== Origin ==
The Volunteer Force of part-time soldiers was created following an invasion scare in 1859, and its constituent units were progressively aligned with the Regular British Army as the 19th Century progressed. The Stanhope Memorandum of December 1888 introduced a Mobilisation Scheme for Volunteer units, which would assemble in their own brigades at key points in case of war. In peacetime these brigades provided a structure for collective training.

The North London Brigade was one of the formations organised at this time. The commanding officer of the Coldstream Guards and his adjutant were ex officio the brigade commander and brigade major, while the Coldstream Guards' orderly room at Wellington Barracks acted as brigade headquarters. The brigade's original composition was:

North London Brigade

- 1st Middlesex Rifle Volunteer Corps (Queen Victoria's Rifles)
  - 6th Middlesex Rifle Volunteer Corps (St George's) (attached to 1st)
- 16th Middlesex Rifle Volunteer Corps (London Irish Rifles)
- 18th Middlesex Rifle Volunteer Corps (Paddington Rifles)
- 19th Middlesex Rifle Volunteer Corps (St Giles's & St George's Bloomsbury)
- 21st Middlesex Rifle Volunteer Corps (Finsbury Rifles)
- 22nd Middlesex Rifle Volunteer Corps (Central London Rangers)
- Supply Detachment, Army Service Corps
- Bearer Company, Medical Staff Corps

== Territorial Force ==
This organisation was carried over into the Territorial Force (TF) when that was created under the Haldane Reforms in 1908, the North London Brigade becoming the 3rd London Brigade in 1st London Division. The commander and staff continued to be provided by the Coldstream Guards up to the outbreak of war in 1914. All of the Volunteer Battalions in the Central London area became part of the all-Territorial London Regiment and were numbered sequentially through the London brigades and divisions:

3rd London Brigade

- 9th (County of London) Battalion, London Regiment (Queen Victoria's Rifles) (incorporating 6th and 19th Middlesex RVCs)
- 10th (County of London) Battalion, London Regiment (Paddington Rifles)
- 11th (County of London) Battalion, London Regiment (Finsbury Rifles)
- 12th (County of London) Battalion, London Regiment (The Rangers)

The London Irish Rifles became the 18th Londons and transferred to the 5th London Brigade in the 2nd London Division.

In May 1912, however, the 10th Battalion (Paddington Rifles) was disbanded and the personnel were absorbed by 3rd (City of London) Battalion, London Regiment (Royal Fusiliers), part of 1st London Brigade, and was replaced by a new 10th (County of London) Battalion, London Regiment (Hackney Rifles). In 1913 the new battalion was retitled 10th (County of London) Battalion, London Regiment (Hackney).

== First World War ==
The 1st London Division was mobilised in early August 1914, soon after the outbreak of the First World War. Most of the men of the brigade, when asked, elected to volunteer for overseas service (according to the Territorial and Reserve Forces Act 1907, soldiers of the TF were only allowed to serve overseas with their consent). The men who did not volunteer, together with the many recruits coming forward to volunteer, were formed into 2nd Line battalions and brigade, 2/3rd London Brigade, part of 2/1st London Division. These later became 175th (2/3rd London) Brigade and 58th (2/1st London) Division respectively. The battalions were also redesignated, becoming, for example, '1/8th' Londons (for the 1st Line) to differentiate them from the 2nd Line units, which were redesignated '2/8th' Londons (for the 2nd Line).

However, from November 1914 until April 1915 all of the battalions of the brigade were posted elsewhere, either to other formations or to reinforce the tired Regulars of the British Expeditionary Force (BEF) serving on the Western Front. The 3rd London Brigade was, as a result, broken up in April 1915 as was the 1st London Division. The 1/9th and 1/12th Londons were both sent to France, the 1/9th to 13th Brigade of 5th Division, and 1/12th to 84th Brigade of 28th Division, both consisting largely of Regular Army troops. The remaining two battalions, the 1/10th and 1/11th Londons, were both transferred to 162nd (1/1st East Midland) Brigade, 54th (East Anglian) Division

In early 1916 the War Office authorised for the division to be reformed in France, although now it was to be known as 56th (1/1st London) Division and the brigade came into existence again, now the 169th (1/3rd London) Brigade but was now composed mainly of different units, with the exception of 1/9th Londons. The other three battalions had joined mainly from other divisions, the 1/2nd Londons had originally been with 1st London Brigade and fought in France with 17th Brigade of 6th Division (later 24th Division), and the 1/5th Londons, originally part of 2nd London Brigade, had served with 11th Brigade of 4th Division (later 8th Brigade of 3rd Division) and the 1/16th Londons, originally of 4th London Brigade of 2nd London Division, later served with 18th Brigade of 6th Division, before transferring to 169th Brigade.

The reformed brigade would serve with 56th Division for the rest of the war, fighting in the trenches of the Western Front in both Belgium and France and saw its first action fighting alongside the 46th (North Midland) Division on the Gommecourt Salient on 1 July 1916, to distract the German Army's attention away from the simultaneous Somme offensive. The first day of the Somme was a complete failure, and saw nearly 60,000 casualties being sustained by the British Army, the bloodiest day in British military history. The diversionary assault at Gommecourt was also considered a failure, sustaining only heavy casualties for both divisions involved, with 56th Division suffering 4,567 men and 182 officers killed, wounded or missing. The division later participated in the pursuit of the German Army when they retreated to the Hindenburg Line in early 1917, and later in battles at Arras, Langemarck, Passchendaele, Cambrai, Albert, Spring Offensive, and the Hundred Days Offensive, suffering heavy casualties in nearly all engagements. By the time of the Armistice of 11 November 1918 the division had sustained nearly 35,000 casualties in just over two and a half years.

=== Order of battle ===
The brigade was composed as follows during the war:

- 1/9th (County of London) Battalion, London Regiment (Queen Victoria's Rifles) (left November 1914, rejoined February 1916, left February 1918)
- 1/10th (County of London) Battalion, London Regiment (Hackney) (left April 1915)
- 1/11th (County of London) Battalion, London Regiment (Finsbury Rifles) (left April 1915)
- 1/12th (County of London) Battalion, London Regiment (The Rangers) (left December 1914)
- 1/2nd (City of London) Battalion, London Regiment (Royal Fusiliers) (joined February 1916)
- 1/5th (City of London) Battalion, London Regiment (London Rifle Brigade) (joined February 1916)
- 1/16th (County of London) Battalion, London Regiment (Queen's Westminster Rifles) (joined February 1916)
- 169th Machine Gun Company, Machine Gun Corps (formed 17 March 1916, moved to 56th Battalion, Machine Gun Corps 1 March 1918)
- 169th Trench Mortar Battery (joined 17 June 1916)

Due to a shortage of manpower in the BEF in early 1918, all British divisions serving on the Western Front were reduced from twelve to nine infantry battalions, with all brigades reducing to three. The 1/9th Londons (the only original battalion of the brigade) were, therefore, transferred from 169th Brigade to 175th (2/3rd London) Brigade of 58th (2/1st London) Division where they were amalgamated with the 2/9th Londons and was subsequently renamed the 9th Battalion. On 6 February, with the disbandment of 2/5th Londons, the 1/5th was redesignated as the 5th Battalion.

== Between the wars ==
The Territorial Force was disbanded after the war but later reformed in 1920 as the Territorial Army, formed on a very similar basis to the old Territorial Force. The brigade was reformed as the 169th (3rd London) Infantry Brigade, along with the rest of the division, with much the same composition it had before the Great War, of four Territorial battalions of the London Regiment. In 1922 all battalions of the London Regiment dropped the 'battalion' from their title, becoming, for example, 9th London Regiment (Queen Victoria's Rifles).

Throughout the inter-war years 169th Brigade, unlike the other two brigades of 56 Division, saw little change in its composition until the middle part of the 1930s. In 1935 the 10th London Regiment (Hackney) was transferred as a replacement battalion to 167th (1st London) Infantry Brigade. Due to a serious need to strengthen the anti-aircraft defences of the United Kingdom, particularly for London, Southern England and the Midlands, many infantry battalions of the Territorial Army were, throughout the 1930s, converted into anti-aircraft or searchlight battalions of either the Royal Artillery or Royal Engineers. Therefore, on 15 December 1935, the 11th London Regiment (Finsbury Rifles) was converted into an anti-aircraft role, being transferred to the Royal Artillery, and became 61st (Finsbury Rifles) Anti-Aircraft Brigade, Royal Artillery, becoming part of 28th (Thames and Medway) Anti-Aircraft Group, attached to 1st Anti-Aircraft Division, which was formed by the redesignation of the Headquarters of 47th (2nd London) Infantry Division. Two replacement battalions arrived, the first being the 17th London Regiment (Tower Hamlets Rifles), previously the 17th (County of London) Battalion, London Regiment (Poplar and Stepney Rifles) and, more recently, 17th London Regiment (Tower Hamlets Rifles). The other replacement battalion was the 18th London Regiment (London Irish Rifles). Both battalions were originally from 141st (5th London) Infantry Brigade from the now disbanded 47th Division. The battalion was previously known as 18th (County of London) Battalion, London Regiment (London Irish Rifles). After the disbandment of the 47th Division, the 56th Division was redesignated simply as The London Division and so the brigade was also redesignated, becoming 3rd London Infantry Brigade.

In 1937 the London Regiment was disbanded after nearly all of its battalions were converted to other roles or posted elsewhere. For the most part, therefore, the battalions previously part of the London Regiment became Territorial battalions of Regular Army regiments. The 9th Londons became the Queen Victoria's Rifles (King's Royal Rifle Corps), 12th Londons became The Rangers (King's Royal Rifle Corps), 17th Londons became the Tower Hamlets Rifles (Rifle Brigade) and 18th Londons became the London Irish Rifles (Royal Ulster Rifles). In the following year all British infantry divisions were reduced from twelve to nine battalions, all brigades reducing to three, and the London Division simultaneously was converted into a motorised infantry division, and so the Queen's Victoria Rifles was transferred from the brigade to become the motorcycle reconnaissance battalion for the division. A further change in 1938 came when the London Irish Rifles was transferred to 1st London Infantry Brigade, making the 3rd a two battalion brigade.

In March 1939, almost as a direct result of the invasion of Czechoslovakia, the Territorial Army was ordered by to be doubled in size and each unit was ordered to form a 2nd Line duplicate, and so both The Rangers and the Tower Hamlets Rifles formed 2nd battalions, with the original battalions becoming the 1st battalions of their respective regiment, and were all assigned to the 3rd London Infantry Brigade.

== Second World War ==
The 3rd London Infantry Brigade and the division, along with the rest of the Territorial Army, were mobilised between late August and early September 1939, due to the already tense situation in Europe becoming worse when, on 1 September, the German Army invaded Poland. Two days later, both Britain and France declared war on Germany, thus beginning the Second World War.

Initially assigned to the 1st London Infantry Division, in October 1939 the brigade was reassigned to 2nd London Infantry Division, formed in April 1939 as a 2nd Line duplicate of the original London Division (which had been redesignated 1st London Division upon creation of a duplicate 2nd).

In the New Year of January 1940 the 1st battalions of both the Tower Hamlets Rifles and The Rangers were transferred elsewhere, leaving only the two 2nd Line duplicate battalions in the brigade. Later in the year the remaining battalions were also posted away, on 16 October, the 2nd Tower Hamlets Rifles was transferred to the newly created 26th Armoured Brigade and the 2nd Rangers, on 15 October, became part of 20th Armoured Brigade. On 28 November 1940 the brigade Headquarters was redesignated as Headquarters 71st Infantry Brigade.

A new 169th Brigade was created on the same day from the redesignation of the 35th Infantry Brigade, which was renumbered 169th (London) Infantry Brigade on 28 November 1940. The brigade, also known frequently as the "Queen's Brigade", was composed of the 2/5th, 2/6th (Bermondsey) and 2/7th (Southwark) battalions of the Queen's Royal Regiment (West Surrey), all Territorial battalions. The 35th Brigade had been part of the 12th (Eastern) Infantry Division and seen service with the British Expeditionary Force (BEF) in the Battle of France where they were forced into a retreat to Dunkirk, where they suffered heavy casualties and were evacuated to England. Shortly after arriving back in England the 12th Division was disbanded in July and its brigades sent elsewhere, the 35th transferring to the 1st London Infantry Division, and reforming it a standard infantry division. On 18 November 1940 the division regained its historical number and was redesignated 56th (London) Infantry Division.

The brigade, brought up to strength earlier in the year with large numbers of conscripts, remained with the division in Kent, under command of XII Corps, and, as with most of the rest of the British Army after the evacuation from Dunkirk, either on coastal defence and home service duties or training to repel a German invasion of England which was, at the time, thought highly likely.

In November 1941, after serving in Kent since July 1940, the division moved to East Anglia, in particular to Suffolk, where they came under command of XI Corps. The move to Suffolk proved to be popular for the many men, mostly conscripts but also wartime volunteers, from the nearby counties who had joined the brigade since Dunkirk. The brigade performed much the same duties as they had in Kent, performing home defence duties and in training to expel an invasion. As the spring of 1942 arrived the brigade, and in turn the rest of 56th Division, were involved in more and more demanding large-scale exercises. However, there was a drain on the battalions as they were frequently required to send drafts overseas as replacements for the 1st and 2nd battalions, both Regular Army units stationed in the India and the Middle East, respectively. The brigade soon left to be sent to Essex for a month before returning to Suffolk again and in July, after being brought up to full War Establishment strength, began to prepare for overseas service although the whereabouts where as yet unknown and the men of the battalions were given 14 days leave.

Shortly before departing the men of the brigade and division were visited by General Sir Bernard Paget, Commander-in-Chief, Home Forces, followed by His Majesty King George VI The division left the United Kingdom from Liverpool on 25 August 1942 and were sent to Iraq where they arrived on 4 November and came under command of III Corps alongside the British 5th Infantry Division, part of the British Tenth Army, itself under overall command of Persia and Iraq Command and Middle East Command.

The 56th Division remained in Iraq, participating in numerous exercises throughout the months stationed there (with the Queen's Brigade participating in Exercise 'Fortissimo', watched by over 5,000 people). On 19 March 1943, however, the brigade, the men now very well trained and fit, received orders to depart for Egypt and were relieved by the Polish 3rd Carpathian Rifle Division. The brigade arrived in Egypt, by road, on 19 April 1943, and from there was ordered to Tunisia to join X Corps of the British Eighth Army, which was fighting in the Campaign in Tunisia. By now the brigade had covered a distance of over 3,200 miles. The 169th (Queen's) Brigade, now 10 miles south of Enfidaville, relieved the 69th Infantry Brigade, part of the 50th (Northumbrian) Infantry Division and suffered its first casualties (as part of 56th Division) on 23 April 1943, from shellfire. The campaign in Tunisia ended less than a month later with the surrender of over 230,000 Italian and German soldiers, a number almost equal to that captured at the Battle of Stalingrad the year before, who would become Prisoners of war. Despite playing only a comparatively minor part in the campaign the Queen's Brigade had suffered over 250 casualties, around 10% of the overall strength of the brigade. The 2/5th Queen's had 85 casualties, 15 of them being killed, the rest wounded, 2/6th Queen's had lost their Commanding Officer along with 15 other ranks killed and a further 79 officers and men wounded and 2/7th Queen's had one officer and 20 men killed and four officers and 62 men wounded.

The 56th Division (minus the 168th Brigade which was detached to come under command of the 50th Division in April 1943) did not take part in Operation Husky, the invasion of Sicily, but instead remained behind in reserve in Libya where they were visited by many senior high-ranking officers and H.M. The King George VI, who had visited them nearly a year before when they began departing for overseas service, and the men cheered as he drove past. On 1 June they celebrated the Glorious First of June. In July, the 169th (Queen's) Brigade began training in amphibious warfare for the upcoming invasion of the Italian mainland, code-named Operation Avalanche, with D-Day being scheduled for 9 September where they were assigned as an assault brigade.

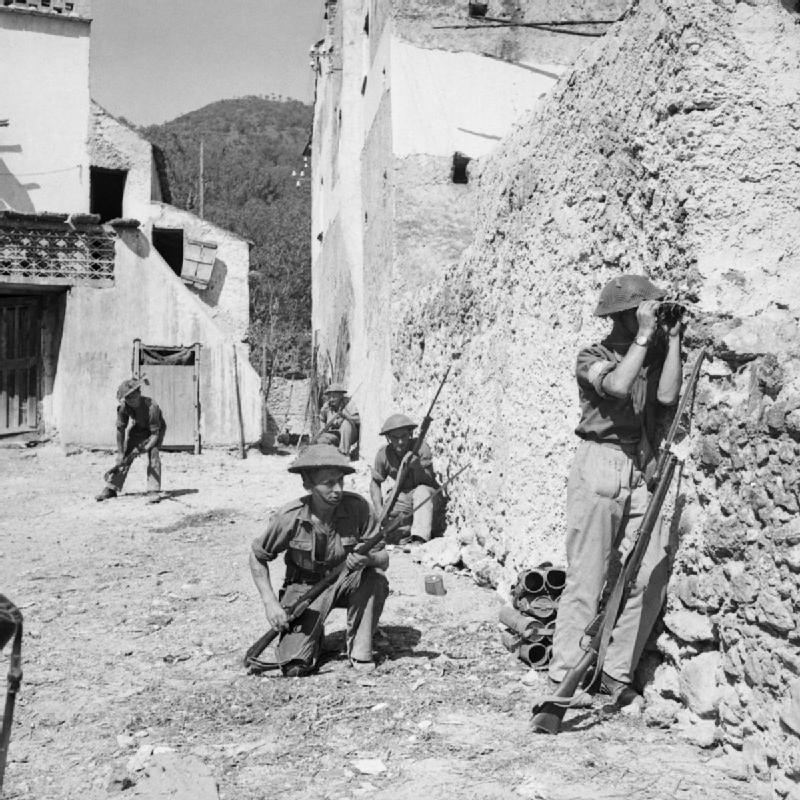
A patrol of the 2/7th Battalion, Queen's Royal Regiment enters the village of Pugliano, Italy, September 1943.

The 56th Division left Libya, where they had remained for nearly the past four months, on 4 September and were at sea for the next four days and landed at Salerno on 9 September 1943, D-Day, and initially met light opposition but soon met heavy resistance as the Germans tried desperately to repel the Allies' invasion. The Queen's Brigade, together with the rest of 56th Division (minus the 168th Brigade, temporarily replaced by the 201st Guards Brigade), which was still part of British X Corps but now under command of the U.S. Fifth Army under Mark W. Clark, saw heavy and confused fighting over the next few days and mounting casualties (by the end of Avalanche most battalions involved had suffered up to 360 casualties) for the next ten days and led to a unique moment in the regiment's history. On 19 September, D-Day + 10, when the Salerno crisis had passed, the 169th (Queen's) Infantry Brigade was relieved in the line by the 131st (Queen's) Infantry Brigade, containing the 1st Line parent 1/5th, 1/6th and 1/7th Queen's, which (also part of British X Corps) had recently arrived as part of the famous 7th Armoured Division, the "Desert Rats". This relief by six battalions of the same regiment in two brigades is believed to not only be a unique moment in the history of the Queen's, but in the history of the British Army as a whole. 9 September is now a special Regimental Day in the Princess of Wales's Royal Regiment, which is also the anniversary of the creation of said regiment. Ironically, the 169th (Queen's) Brigade was, at the time, commanded by Brigadier Lewis Lyne, who would later receive promotion to command of the 7th Armoured Division from November 1944 onwards. Together with the rest of the division, the brigade advanced up Italy and later crossed the Volturno Line.

On the morning of 18 October, the brigade was ordered to secure the village of Calvi Risorta, which was to be aided by bombardment from air support. However, the village was captured before the scheduled bombardment but the message that it had been captured, delivered by a pigeon named G.I. Joe, of the U.S. Army Pigeon Service, managed to arrive in time to avoid the bombing, after having flown 20 miles in 20 minutes. In doing so, he had saved the lives of many soldiers as well as the civilians of the village. Soon afterwards, the brigade crossed the Barbara Line but, with the rest of Allied Armies in Italy, were eventually held up by the formidable Winter Line defences (or Gustav Line). On 2 December, when fighting in front of the Bernhardt Line (a smaller part of the Winter Line), the Queen's Brigade led an assault to capture Monte Camino, which took four days of hard fighting to capture the mountain and saw casualties for 2/5th Queen's, which spearheaded the assault. The commanding officer (CO) of the 2/5th Queen's, Lieutenant Colonel John Yeldham Whitfield, was awarded the Distinguished Service Order for his actions in capturing Camino, leading personally from the front with his Webley revolver. He was also awarded the Red Star Order from a general of the Russian Army in Italy. He would later command the 56th Division and it was largely due to him that the brigade avoided being split up and "retained their integrity as a Queen's Brigade". By the end of the war, it was the only brigade of the 56th Division not to undergo any significant changes in its composition.

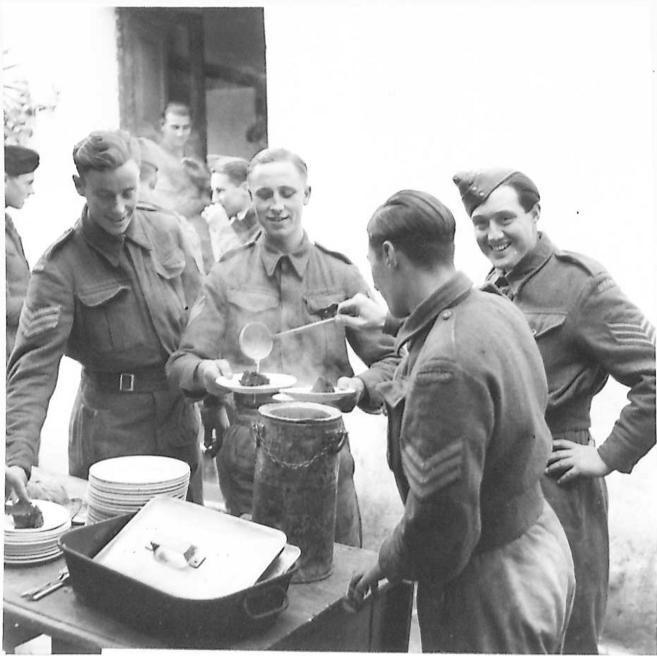
British troops celebrate Christmas Day 1943 near the front. Sergeants of the 2/6th Battalion, Queen's Royal Regiment (West Surrey) serving their men with Christmas pudding.

The Queen's Brigade continued to fight in front of the Bernhardt Line, and crossed the Garigliano river in January 1944, part of the First Battle of Monte Cassino. In mid-February, however, the brigade was pulled out of the line and, with most of the 56th Division (168th Brigade had already been sent earlier in the month), was sent to Anzio, scene of much better fighting in the Battle for the Anzio beachhead, where the division came under command of U.S. VI Corps.

The division started to land around mid-February, with the Queen's Brigade landing on 16 February, coincidentally at the same time the Germans launched a major counter-attack and all three Queen's battalions were immediately deployed in the front line. The 2/7th Queen's, chosen as it was "fresh", was given a task to locate and extract a U.S. Army battalion, the 2nd Battalion of the 157th Infantry Regiment, part of U.S. 45th Infantry Division, which was surrounded and isolated a mile from the main frontline and suffering heavy casualties. The 2/7th Queen's completed the task but, in the process, themselves suffered very heavy losses in what is known to veterans as the Battle of the Caves. Casualties were high at 85%, with 362 officers and men being lost, nearly half the strength of a British infantry battalion at the time, most being taken prisoner. The other battalions would come to suffer similar casualties. For the next few weeks, the brigade, together with the Americans and Germans, "fought for some of the most miserable terrain on the planet Earth in" almost a "trench-warfare stalemate" more alike to that suffered a generation before on the Western Front during the First World War. Although not involved in any major fighting, the battalions were under almost constant artillery or mortar fire, causing a steady stream of casualties. The division was relieved in the line on 28 March 1944 by the British 5th Infantry Division and sent to Egypt to rest and refit, after several weeks of nearly continuous combat.

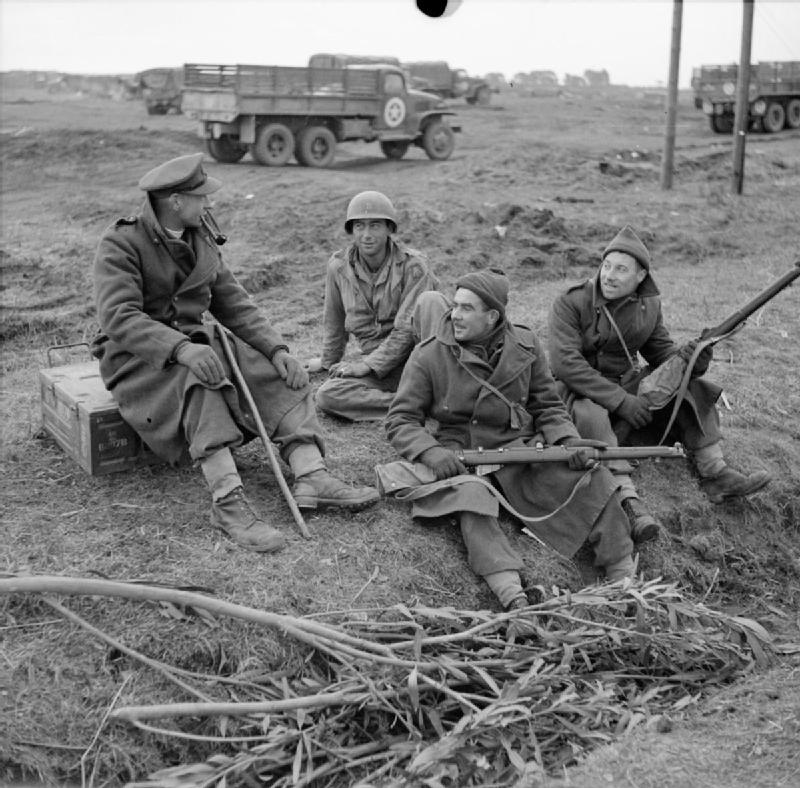
Reverend G. B. Fairhurst, Padre of the 2/5th Battalion, Queen's Royal Regiment, talking to two of the men in his battalion and an American soldier in the Anzio bridgehead, Italy, 20–21 February 1944.

The Queen's Brigade had by this time sustained 45% casualties, nearly half its strength, in just a few weeks, testimony to the severity of fighting at Anzio. Although high, this was not the highest casualty rate of the division, with 168th Brigade suffering slightly higher, at 50%. The brigade arrived in Egypt on 4 April and, throughout the next few weeks, was brought up to strength from returning wounded and by receiving large drafts of replacements in the form of ex-anti-aircraft gunners of the Royal Artillery, and with the absence of the Luftwaffe now found their original roles redundant, who had been retrained as infantrymen and had to be taught all the infantry weapons. In April the Queen's Brigade was inspected by General Sir Bernard Paget, now Commander-in-Chief of Middle East Command, who had inspected the division nearly two years before when the division was still 'green' and inexperienced and was preparing for overseas service. In late June the Queen's Brigade, now up to strength, learned they were to return to Italy, where they landed on 17 July. While at Tivoli the 169th (Queen's) Brigade, and the whole of the 56th Division, was inspected again by H.M. The King George VI, who had visited them almost exactly two years before when the division was preparing for overseas service. Soon after, on 26 July, the 56th Division received a new General Officer Commanding GOC, Major-General John Yeldham Whitfield, who was previously the CO of the 2/5th Battalion, Queen's before being promoted to command of 13th Brigade (British 5th Division) and returning to take over from Major-General Gerald Templer.

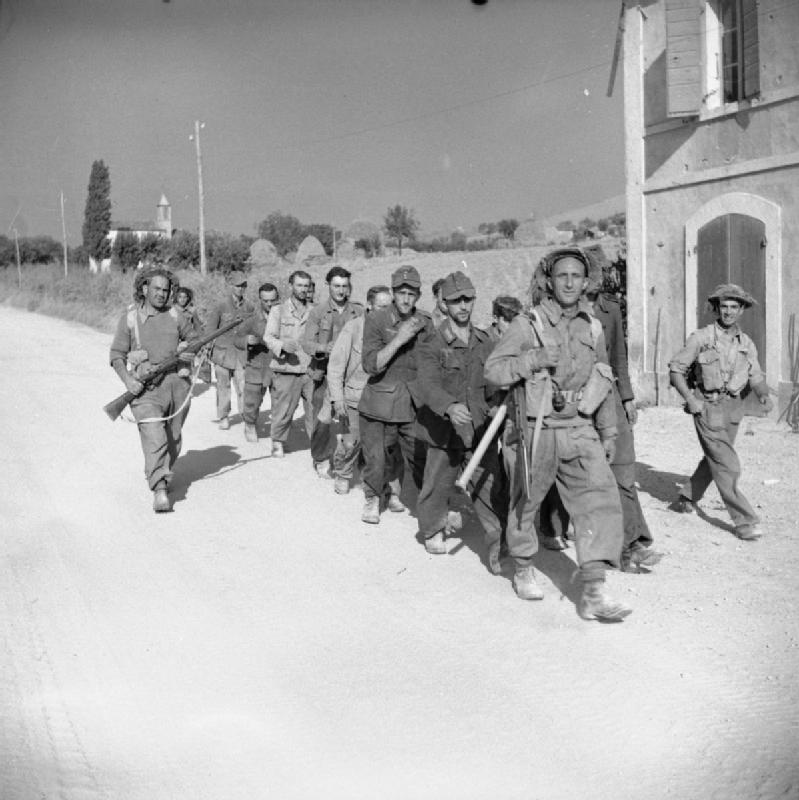
German prisoners being marched into captivity by men of the Queen's Royal Regiment, 56th Division, Montefiore area, 13 September 1944.

Soon after arriving the division, now back under Eighth Army command for the first time since May 1943, was involved in the fighting around the Gothic Line (also known as Operation Olive, where the Eighth Army sustained 14,000 casualties, nearly 1,000 per day) in the severe heat of the summer. In particular, during the first week of September, the Queen's Brigade was the spearhead of the 56th Division in its attempt to capture Gemmano Ridge (nicknamed by military historians as the "Cassino of the Adriatic"), which was captured on 8 September by 2/7th Queen's. The attack by two battalions, and supported by very heavy artillery fire, was "watched with pride by their fellow Queensman, Maj-Gen Whitfield". They managed to capture 100 prisoners of war, from the German 5th Mountain Division. The Germans later launched a series of intense counterattacks against all three Queen's battalions with the whole brigade being involved, but these were beaten off and the brigade managed to successfully hold on to the village. The day after, the Queen's Brigade was relieved by 139th Infantry Brigade of British 46th Infantry Division. On 13 September Brigadier Grenfell Smith-Dorrien, commanding the Queen's Brigade and son of General Sir Horace Smith-Dorrien, a general who served in the First World War, was killed by enemy shellfire. The battles around the Gothic Line lasted another few weeks, and by the end of the battle the 56th Division had sustained very heavy casualties, and the Queen's Brigade was reduced to nearly half strength, with all three battalions losing up to 400 casualties whereas the division itself had been reduced to virtually two brigades and had to be completely reorganised. The brigade was again brought up to strength from anti-aircraft gunners and men from the 7th Battalion, Oxfordshire and Buckinghamshire Light Infantry (previously of 167th Brigade) and the 1st Battalion, Welch Regiment (from the now disbanded 168th Brigade), the former was now disbanded due to the acute shortage of manpower that plagued the British Army at this stage of the war whereas the 1st Welch was reduced to a small cadre. However, the manpower available was simply not enough, and, as a direct result of heavy casualties and the lack of infantrymen, all British infantry battalions in serving Italy were reduced from four to three rifle companies and this "would seriously hamper deployment once one of the three suffered loss." The Gothic Line offensive had been partially successful, with the Eighth Army commander, General Sir Oliver Leese, claiming that he "had 'severely mauled' eleven German divisions and taken over 8,000 prisoners" but it had delivered far less than had been expected and with the weather worsening due to the oncoming autumn rains and snow of winter, and no hope of a successful breakthrough offensive in such weather, both the U.S. Fifth and British Eighth Armies settled down and began to prepare plans for a final offensive against the Germans in the spring, with the scheduled date being for 1 April 1945. On 30 November, the Queen's Brigade was temporarily detached from 56th Division command to come under control of British 46th Division, replacing the 139th Brigade which had been transferred to Greece, and reverted to 56th Division on 11 December 1944, when both the 138th and 169th brigades were relieved by the 2nd New Zealand Division.

In April 1945 the Queen's Brigade, together with the rest of 56th Division, and the 15th Army Group fought in the final offensive in Italy (Operation Grapeshot). The 56th Infantry Division, fighting alongside the British 78th Infantry Division (nicknamed "The Battleaxe Division", the 78th served with distinction, many times alongside the 56th, throughout the whole campaign), played a major role in the Battle of the Argenta Gap where the Queen's Brigade, riding in LVTs (nicknamed Fantails) manned by the 27th Lancers and the U.S. 755th Tank Battalion, captured, with minimal loss, 300 prisoners of war from the 42nd Jäger Division which greatly surprised the Germans. The brigade continued to fight in the offensive, which ultimately ended on 2 May 1945 with the surrender of all German forces in Italy and, after nearly 20 months of fighting (minus a single day), finally saw an end to the Italian Campaign. The Queen's Brigade in the final offensive had, unusually for the fighting in Italy, suffered light casualties. The British Eighth Army moved into Austria for occupation duties soon after Victory in Europe Day and was redesignated British Troops Austria and the brigade entered Vienna and began occupation duties.

=== Order of battle ===
3rd London Infantry Brigade was constituted as follows during the war:

- 1st Battalion, The Rangers (left 19 January 1940)
- 1st Battalion, Tower Hamlets Rifles (left 19 January 1940)
- 2nd Battalion, The Rangers (left 14 November 1940)
- 2nd Battalion, Tower Hamlets Rifles (left 15 November 1940)

From 28 November 1940 169th Infantry Brigade was constituted as follows:

- 2/5th Battalion, Queen's Royal Regiment (West Surrey)
- 2/6th (Bermondsey) Battalion, Queen's Royal Regiment (West Surrey)
- 2/7th (Southwark) Battalion, Queen's Royal Regiment (West Surrey)
- 169th (London) Infantry Brigade Anti-Tank Company (formed (as 35th Inf Bde A/T Company) 2 October 1940, redesignated 28 November 1940, joined 56th Reconnaissance Battalion 7 January 1941)

=== Commanders ===
The following officers commanded 3rd London Infantry Brigade during the war:

- Brigadier H.V. Combe (until 28 November 1940)

From 28 November 1940 the following officers commanded 169th Infantry Brigade:

- Brigadier E.C. Hayes (from 9 August 1940 until 16 May 1941)
- Brigadier R.A.G. Taylor (from 16 May 1941 until 12 March 1942)
- Brigadier L.O. Lyne (from 12 March 1942 until 10 October 1943, again from 16 October, injured 13 November 1943, again from 28 November until 8 January 1944, from 21 January until 20 March 1944)
- Lieutenant Colonel J.Y. Whitfield (Acting, from 10 to 16 October 1943, again from 13 to 28 November 1943, from 6 to 21 January 1944)
- Lieutenant-Colonel D.C. Baynes (Acting, from 20 to 24 March 1944)
- Brigadier G.H.G. Smith-Dorrien (from 24 March 1944, KIA 13 September 1944)
- Lieutenant-Colonel C.R. Spincer (Acting, from 13 to 16 September 1944)
- Brigadier W.H. Stratton (from 16 September 1944 until 26 June 1945)
- Brigadier P.H. Richardson (from 26 June 1945)

== Post-war ==
The brigade remained in Italy after the war until it was disbanded, with the battalions being absorbed by their 1st Line parent formations. When the Territorial Army was reconstituted in 1947 56th Division was reorganised as an armoured formation and 169th Brigade was not reformed. However, the division converted back into an infantry formation in 1956, and the brigade was reformed with the following organisation:

169 (Greenjacket) Brigade

- Queen Victoria's Rifles (King's Royal Rifle Corps)
- Queen's Westminsters (King's Royal Rifle Corps)
- London Rifle Brigade/Rangers (Rifle Brigade)

56th Division was finally disbanded in 1961.

== Bibliography ==
- Ian F.W. Beckett, Riflemen Form: A Study of the Rifle Volunteer Movement 1859–1908, Aldershot: Ogilby Trusts, 1982, ISBN 0 85936 271 X.
- Blaxland, Gregory (1979). Alexander's Generals (the Italian Campaign 1944-1945). London: William Kimber. ISBN 0-7183-0386-5.
- d'Este, Carlo (1991). Fatal Decision: Anzio and the Battle for Rome. New York: Harper. ISBN 0-06-015890-5.
- John K. Dunlop, The Development of the British Army 1899–1914, London: Methuen, 1938.
- D.K. Edwards, A History of the 1st Middlesex Volunteer Engineers (101 (London) Engineer Regiment, TA) 1860–1967, London, 1967.
- Hoyt, Edwin Palmer (2002). Backwater War: the Allied Campaign in Italy, 1943–1945. Greenwood Publishing Group. ISBN 978-0-275-97478-7.
- Joslen, H. F. (2003) [1960]. Orders of Battle: Second World War, 1939–1945. Uckfield, East Sussex: Naval and Military Press. ISBN 978-1-84342-474-1.
- H.R. Martin, Historical Record of the London Regiment, 2nd Edn (nd)
- R. Money Barnes, The Soldiers of London, London: Seeley Service, 1963.
- Ray Westlake, Tracing the Rifle Volunteers, Barnsley: Pen and Sword, 2010, ISBN 978-1-84884-211-3.
- David Williams, The Black Cats at War: The Story of the 56th (London) Division T.A., 1939–1945
