= Malcolm Needs =

English writer and filmmaker

- Born: 19 December 1957 (age 67); Edmonton, London, England
- Occupation(s): Writer, film director

Malcolm Richard Needs (19 December 1957, Edmonton, North London) is an English writer and filmmaker.

He is the owner of TheMovieWorks and is an avid Tottenham Hotspur supporter.

== Early life ==
Malcolm Needs was born on 19 December 1957, the fourth of five children to parents John and Gwen Needs. He attended Fleecefield Primary school in Edmonton and later Chace Boys in Enfield. He became the assistant golf professional at Whitewebbs Golf course, Enfield and later became the teaching professional after qualifying at the Professional Golfers Association school at the National Sports Centre, Lilleshall.

== Career ==
=== Radio ===
He started writing comedy in the late eighties and soon became a commissioned writer for BBC radio. Writing gags and sketches for The News Huddlines starring Roy Hudd, June Whitfield, and Chris Emmet.

=== Theatre ===
His first play Strip Poker, starring Barbara Drennan, Ione Skye, and Gary Hailes was performed at the Fox Theatre in North London. The play moved to the Jermyn Street Theatre, Piccadilly. Needs directed the play and the cast changed to include Sue Hodge, Carol Harrison, and Peter Dean. His second play Pin Money, starred and directed by June Brown. Other plays of his are On Holiday and Manhattan Weekend.

=== Films ===
He is the screenwriter of London Rocks, a heist movie currently in development in Los Angeles with producers Mark Ordesky and Jane Fleming, and co-writer with Rich Nathanson, of SafeWord, a psychological thriller. He also wrote The Last Cemetery in Berlin, a feature film for producer Jonathan Sanger and co-wrote with Peter Howitt, The Persuaders, a feature film based on the 1970s hit TV series that starred Tony Curtis and Roger Moore. He was the creative consultant on Dangerous Parking a feature film starring, Peter Howitt, Saffron Burrows, Tom Conti, Alice Evans, Rachael Stirling, and Sean Pertwee. As creative consultant, he sat in the director's chair for the scenes that included Howitt as an actor. The movie won for Best Director at the Tokyo Film Festival. In 2003, he wrote and directed Charlie, a feature film based on real life London criminal Charlie Richardson. Starring Luke Goss, Steven Berkoff, Anita Dobson, and Leslie Grantham. The movie received a Variety Critics' Choice award at the Karlovy Vary film festival, the first British Film considered for the award for six years. His first film Shoreditch starred Joely Richardson and Shane Richie. Panned by the critics the movie lasted only two weeks in theatres. But more intriguing were the behind the scenes arguments between Needs and the producers, with Needs refusing to attend the opening night in Leicester square. In 2007 he was listed as one of twenty-two directors "unjustly under the critical and popular radar" by Variety. He is currently represented by Stephen Marks of Evolution Entertainment in LA.

=== Campaign and others ===
He created "Wrap up Warm". A campaign DVD for Sir Paul McCartney and Heather Mills that used previously shot undercover footage highlighting the trade in cat and dog fur around the world. The DVD won an IVCA Clarion Award and was shown to politicians at the European Parliament, Strasbourg and representatives of the Chinese Government. The images were so powerful they helped the campaign convince China to change their trading policies on the use of cat and dog fur. He also directed for McCartney's Adopt-A-Mine campaign. He also created the DVD that accompanied "My Brilliant Feat". It is a single (a charity tribute to the late footballer George Best) by Colin Hay, former lead vocalist of the Australian band Men at Work. The song was number one in the iTunes albums download chart for Christmas 2021. He co-directed the viral comedy "Brilliant," for Comedy Ink Productions. He also wrote the question for the English version of the popular board game Apples-to-Apples

== Awards ==
- Variety Critics Choice Award – "Charlie"
- IVCA Clarion Awards – "Wrap up Warm"
