= London Regiment (1908–1938) =

- Active: 1908–1938
- Allegiance: United Kingdom
- Branch: British Army
- Type: Infantry
- Role: Territorial Force / Territorial Army

The London Regiment was an infantry regiment in the British Army, part of the Territorial Force (renamed the Territorial Army in 1921). The regiment saw service in the First World War and was disbanded in 1938, shortly before the Second World War, when most of its battalions were converted to other roles or transferred elsewhere, and reformed in 1993. The London Guards date their formation to that of this regiment in 1908.

== History ==
=== 1908 ===
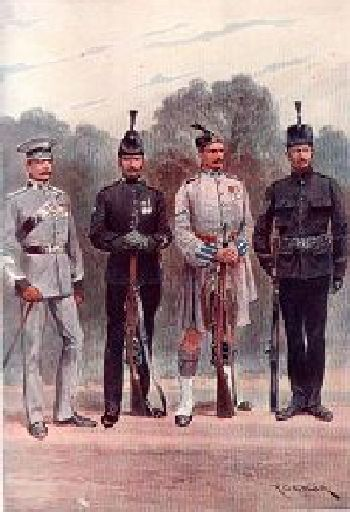
Battalions of the London Regiment early 1900s by Richard Caton Woodville (1856–1927)

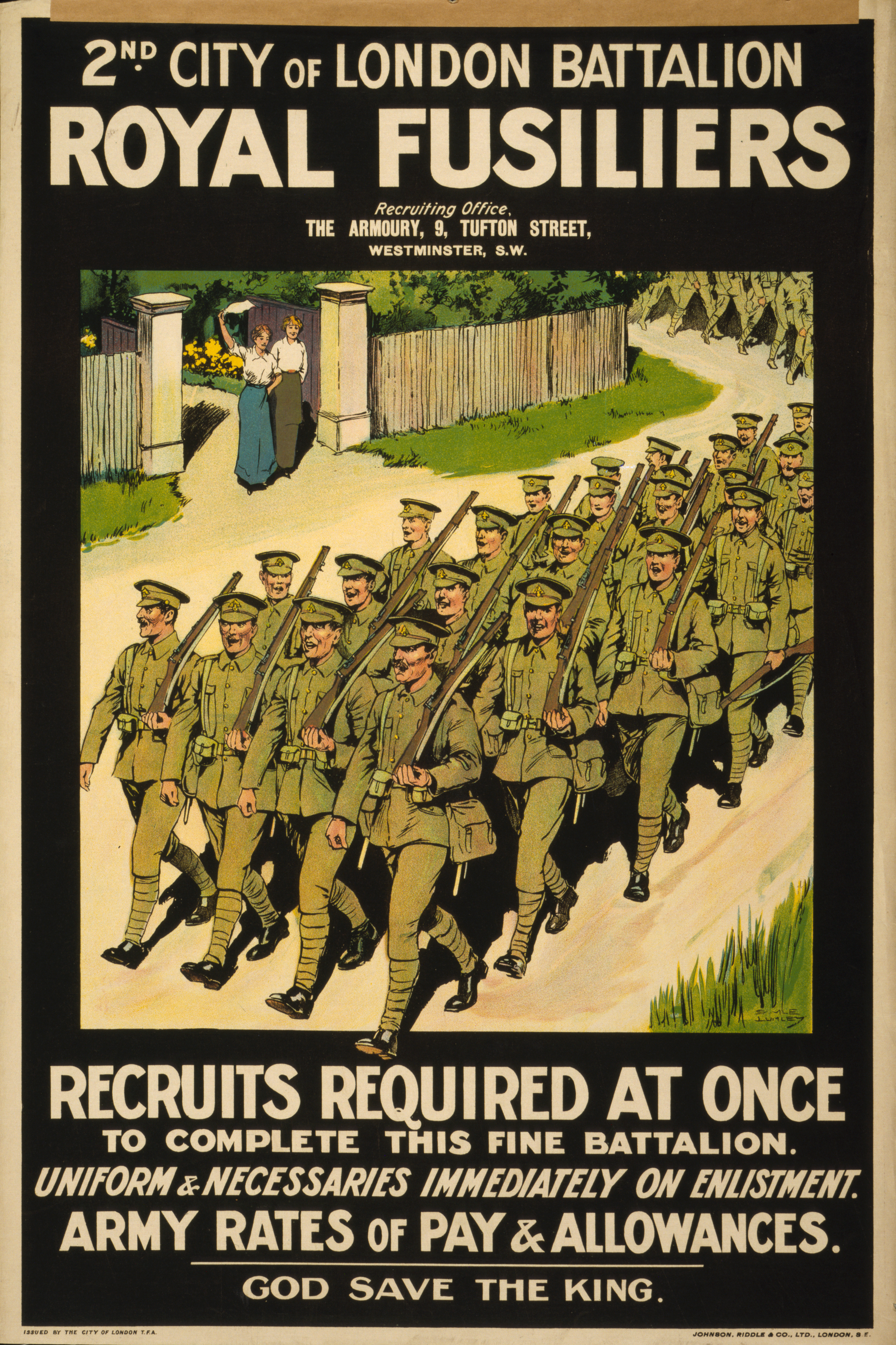
A 1915 recruitment poster for 2nd City of London Battalion, Royal Fusiliers.

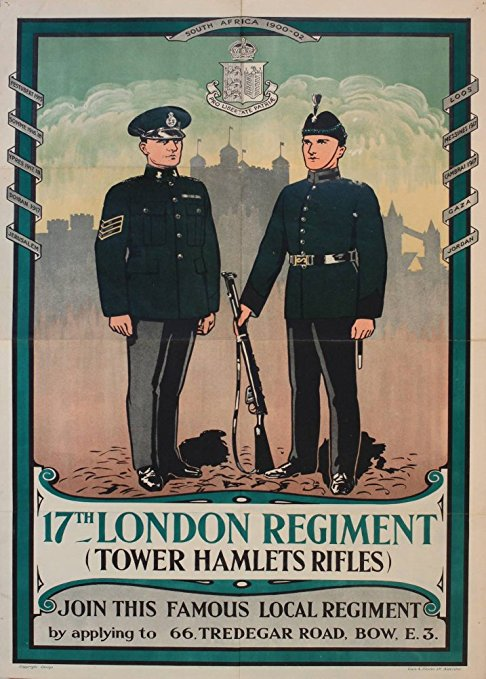
Recruitment poster for the London Regiment during the interwar years.

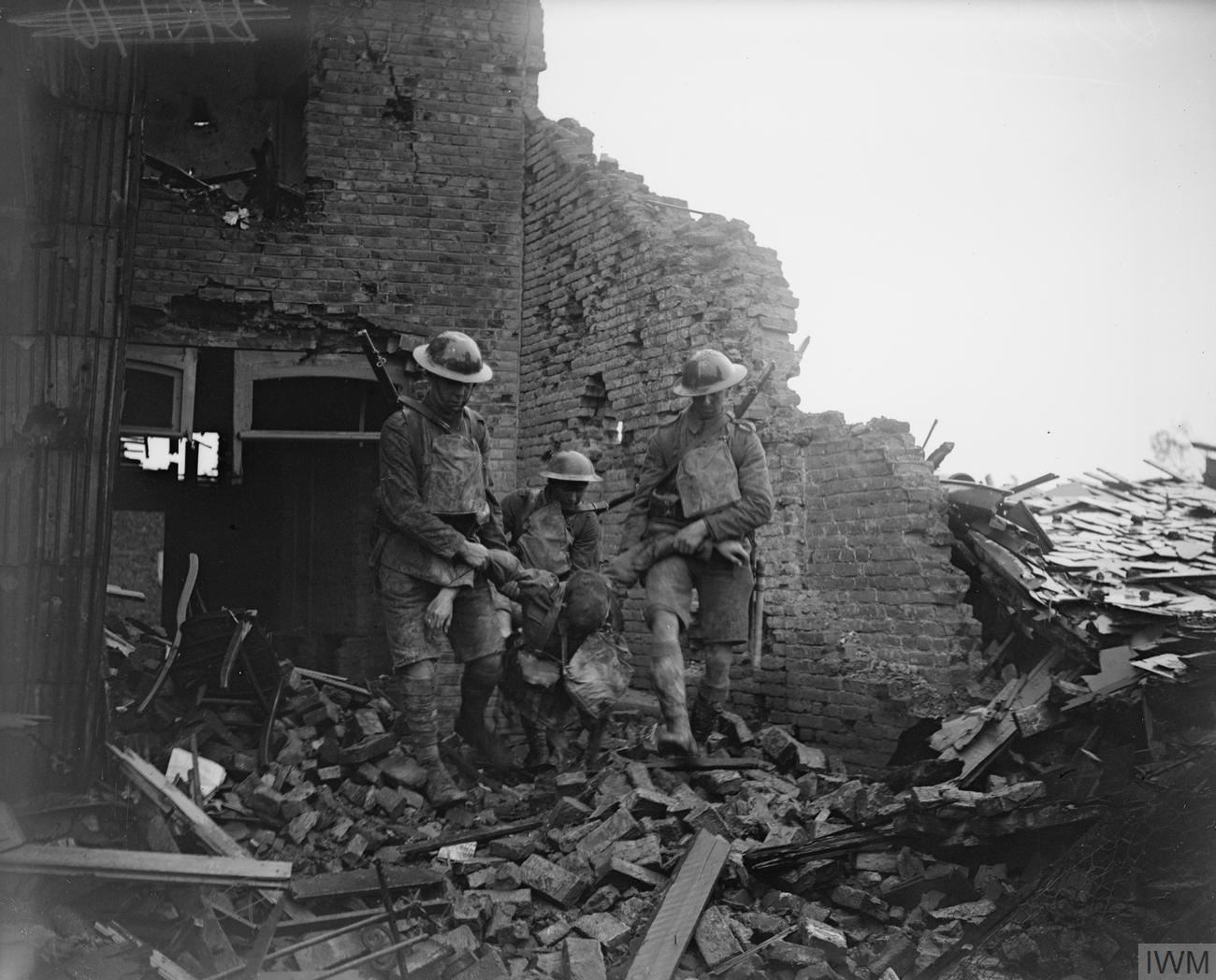
The London Regiment on the Western Front, c.1914–1918

The regiment was first formed in 1908 to regiment the 26 Volunteer Force battalions in the newly formed County of London, each battalion having a distinctive uniform. The London battalions formed the London District, which consisted principally of the 1st and 2nd London Divisions.

=== First World War ===
Now part of the Territorial Force, the London Regiment expanded to 88 battalions in the First World War. Of these, 49 battalions saw action in the trenches of the Western Front in France and Flanders, six saw action in the Gallipoli campaign, 12 saw action at Salonika, 14 saw action against the Turks in Palestine, and one saw action in Waziristan and Afghanistan.

Shortly after the outbreak of the First World War, the formation of Reserve or 2nd-Line units for each existing Territorial Force unit was authorised. They were distinguished by a '2/' prefix from their parent unit (prefixed '1/'). Initially these were formed from men who had not volunteered for overseas service, and the recruits who were flooding in. Later they were mobilised for overseas service in their own right and new 3rd Line units were created to supply drafts to the two service battalions. Unusually, the 1st, 2nd, 3rd and 4th London Battalions each sent three battalions overseas and formed 4th Line reserve units. Thus the 26 pre-war battalions of the London regiment became 82 battalions.

In June 1915, men of Territorial Force units who had only volunteered for Home service were formed into composite Provisional Battalions for coast defence. In 1916 the Military Service Act swept away the Home/Overseas service distinction and the provisional battalions took on the dual role of home defence and physical conditioning to render men fit for drafting overseas. For example, the 100th Provisional Battalion was formed from Home Service men of 173rd (3/1st London) Brigade (3/1st, 3/2nd, 3/3rd and 3/4th Bns London Regiment). 104th and 105th Provisional Battalions were assigned to the Honourable Artillery Company (which was nominally a battalion of the London Regiment but never accepted that identity), whilst 100th–103rd and 106th–108th Provisional Battalions were assigned to the London Regiment in general.

=== Post-war ===
The London Regiment was reformed in the Territorial Army in the 1920s and its individual battalions were granted battle honours in 1924. However, the regiment ceased to exist in 1938 and the battalions were all transferred to regular infantry regiments, the Royal Artillery or the Royal Engineers. For example, 5th Battalion became 1st Battalion, London Rifle Brigade, The Rifle Brigade (Prince Consort's Own).

The London Regiment was reformed in 1993 through the re-regimentation of some of the remaining successors of the original regiment (not including, for example, the Artists Rifles or Kensington Regiment (Princess Louise's)), which were part of a number of different TA infantry units: In 2021, under the Future Soldier it was announced that the London Regiment would be re-designated as 1st Battalion London Guards by February 2024.

== List of battalions ==
Unit	RVC identity	Volunteer Battalion identity	Headquarters	1938 identity
1st London Division
1st London Brigade
1st (City of London) Battalion, London Regiment (Royal Fusiliers)	10th Middlesex RVC	1st Volunteer Battalion, Royal Fusiliers	Bloomsbury (Handel Street)	8th (1st City of London) Battalion, Royal Fusiliers
2nd (City of London) Battalion, London Regiment (Royal Fusiliers)	23rd Middlesex RVC	2nd Volunteer Battalion, Royal Fusiliers	Westminster (Tufton Street)	9th (2nd City of London) Battalion, Royal Fusiliers
3rd (City of London) Battalion, London Regiment (Royal Fusiliers)	11th Middlesex RVC	3rd Volunteer Battalion, Royal Fusiliers	St Pancras (Edward Street) (Note: The Edward Street drill hall was damaged during the blitz and demolished after the war; the street is now known as Varndell Street)	10th (3rd City of London) Battalion, Royal Fusiliers
4th (City of London) Battalion, London Regiment (Royal Fusiliers)	1st Tower Hamlets RVC	4th Volunteer Battalion, Royal Fusiliers	Shoreditch (Shaftesbury Street) (Note: Drill hall demolished and the site redeveloped)	60th (City of London) Anti-Aircraft Regiment, Royal Artillery
2nd London Brigade
5th (City of London) Battalion, London Regiment (London Rifle Brigade)	1st London VRC (City of London Volunteer Rifle Brigade)	9th Volunteer Battalion, King's Royal Rifle Corps	Finsbury (Bunhill Row)	1st Battalion, London Rifle Brigade, The Rifle Brigade (Prince Consort's Own)
6th (City of London) Battalion, London Regiment (City of London Rifles)	2nd London VRC	10th Volunteer Battalion, King's Royal Rifle Corps	Finsbury (Farringdon Road)	31st (City of London Rifles) Anti-Aircraft Battalion, Royal Engineers [later 31st (City of London Rifles) Searchlight Regiment, Royal Artillery]
7th (City of London) Battalion, London Regiment	3rd London VRC	11th Volunteer Battalion, King's Royal Rifle Corps	Finsbury (Sun Street)	32nd (7th City of London) Anti-Aircraft Battalion, Royal Engineers [later 32nd (7th City of London) Searchlight Regiment Royal Artillery]
8th (City of London) Battalion, London Regiment (Post Office Rifles)	24th Middlesex VRC	7th Volunteer Battalion, Rifle Brigade	Finsbury (Bunhill Row)	n/a (Note: Absorbed by 7th Battalion London Regiment in 1921.)
3rd London Brigade
9th (County of London) Battalion, London Regiment (Queen Victoria's), Berkeley Square	1st Middlesex (Victoria and St. George's) VRC	4th Volunteer Battalion, King's Royal Rifle Corps	Westminster (Davies Street)	Queen Victoria's Rifles, King's Royal Rifle Corps
9th (County of London) Battalion, London Regiment (Queen Victoria's), Berkeley Square	19th Middlesex (St. Giles's and St. George's, Bloomsbury) VRC	6th Volunteer Battalion, Rifle Brigade	Westminster (Davies Street)	Queen Victoria's Rifles, King's Royal Rifle Corps
10th (County of London) Battalion, London Regiment (Paddington Rifles); disbanded 1912	18th Middlesex VRC	4th Volunteer Battalion, Rifle Brigade	Paddington (Harrow Road)	n/a
10th (County of London) Battalion (Hackney), London Regiment	n/a	formed in 1912 to replace the Paddington Rifles	Hackney (The Grove)	5th (Hackney) Battalion, Royal Berkshire Regiment
11th (County of London) Battalion, London Regiment (Finsbury Rifles)	21st Middlesex (Finsbury) VRC	7th Volunteer Battalion, King's Royal Rifle Corps	Pentonville (Penton Street)	61st (Middlesex) Anti-Aircraft Brigade, Royal Artillery
12th (County of London) Battalion, London Regiment (The Rangers)	22nd Middlesex VRC (Central London Rangers)	8th Volunteer Battalion, King's Royal Rifle Corps	Holborn (Chenies Street)	The Rangers, King's Royal Rifle Corps
2nd London Division
4th London Brigade
13th (County of London) Battalion, London Regiment (Kensington)	4th (Kensington) Middlesex VRC	3rd Volunteer Battalion, King's Royal Rifle Corps	Kensington (Iverna Gardens)	Princess Louise's Kensington Regiment, Middlesex Regiment (Duke of Cambridge's Own)
14th (County of London) Battalion, London Regiment (London Scottish)	7th (London Scottish) Middlesex VRC	1st Volunteer Battalion, Rifle Brigade	Westminster (Buckingham Gate)	London Scottish, Gordon Highlanders
15th (County of London) Battalion, London Regiment (Prince of Wales' Own Civil Service Rifles)	The Prince of Wales's Own 12th Middlesex (Civil Service) VRC	5th Volunteer Battalion, King's Royal Rifle Corps	Westminster (Somerset House)	n/a (Note: Amalgamated into 16th Battalion London Regiment in 1921.)
16th (County of London) Battalion, London Regiment (Queen's Westminster Rifles)	13th Middlesex (Queen's Westminster) VRC	6th Volunteer Battalion, King's Royal Rifle Corps	Kensington (Buckingham Gate)	Queen's Westminsters, The King's Royal Rifle Corps [Later 11th & 12th (Queen's Westminsters) Battalions, King's Royal Rifle Corps]
5th London Brigade
17th (County of London) Battalion, London Regiment (Poplar and Stepney Rifles)	2nd Tower Hamlets VRC	9th Volunteer Battalion, Rifle Brigade	Bow (Tredegar Road)	Tower Hamlets Rifles, Rifle Brigade (Prince Consort's Own) [later 9th Battalion, The Rifle Brigade (Prince Consort's Own) (Tower Hamlets Rifles); 656th Light Anti-Aircraft Regiment Royal Artillery (Rifle Brigade)]
18th (County of London) Battalion, London Regiment (London Irish Rifles)	16th Middlesex (London Irish) VRC	3rd Volunteer Battalion, Rifle Brigade	Chelsea (Duke of York's Headquarters)	London Irish Rifles, Royal Ulster Rifles
19th (County of London) Battalion, London Regiment (St. Pancras)	17th Middlesex (North Middlesex) VRC	3rd Volunteer Battalion, Middlesex Regiment	Camden Town (High Street)	33rd (St. Pancras) Anti-Aircraft Battalion, Royal Engineers [later 33rd (St. Pancras) Anti-Aircraft Battalion, Royal Artillery]
20th (County of London) Battalion, London Regiment (Blackheath and Woolwich)	3rd Kent VRC	2nd Volunteer Battalion, Queen's Own (Royal West Kent Regiment)	Blackheath (Holly Hedge House)	34th (The Queen's Own Royal West Kent) Anti-Aircraft Battalion, Royal Engineers [later 34th Searchlight Regiment, Royal Artillery (Queen's Own Royal West Kent)]
6th London Brigade
21st (County of London) Battalion, London Regiment (First Surrey Rifles)	1st Surrey (South London) VRC	1st Volunteer Battalion, East Surrey Regiment	Camberwell (Flodden Road) (Note: The Flodden Road drill hall was demolished and replaced with a modern structure in 1986)	35th (First Surrey Rifles) Anti-Aircraft Battalion, Royal Engineers [later 35th Searchlight Regiment, Royal Artillery (First Surrey Rifles)]
22nd (County of London) Battalion, London Regiment (Queen's)	6th Surrey RVC	3rd Volunteer Battalion, Queen's (Royal West Surrey Regiment)	Bermondsey (Jamaica Road)	6th (Bermondsey) Battalion, The Queen's Royal Regiment (West Surrey)
23rd (County of London) Battalion, London Regiment	7th Surrey RVC	4th Volunteer Battalion, East Surrey Regiment	Battersea (St John's Hill)	42nd (7th (23rd London) Bn, The East Surrey Regiment) Battalion, Royal Tank Regiment
24th (County of London) Battalion, London Regiment (Queen's)	8th Surrey RVC	4th Volunteer Battalion, Queen's (Royal West Surrey Regiment)	Southwark (New Street)	7th (Southwark) Battalion, The Queen's Royal Regiment (West Surrey)
Others
25th (County of London) Cyclist Battalion, London Regiment.	26th (Cyclist) Middlesex VRC	Rifle Brigade	Fulham (Fulham House)	n/a (Note: Absorbed by 47th (2nd London) Divisional Signals, Royal Signals in 1922.)
26th (County of London) Battalion		Title allotted to Infantry Battalion, Honourable Artillery Company but never used		
27th (County of London) Battalion		Title allotted to the Inns of Court Regiment but never used		
28th (County of London) Battalion, London Regiment (Artists Rifles)	20th Middlesex (Artists) VRC	6th Volunteer Battalion, Rifle Brigade	St Pancras (Dukes Road)	Artists Rifles, Rifle Brigade (Prince Consort's Own) [later 163 Officer Cadet Training Unit]
29th (City of London) Battalion (Note: Formed from 100th and 102nd Provisional Battalions; second-line formation; never saw active service.)				
30th (City of London) Battalion (Note: Formed from 101st and probably 103rd Provisional Battalions.) (Note: Second-line formation; never saw active service.)				
31st (County of London) Battalion (Note: Formed from 107th Provisional Battalion.)				
32nd (County of London) Battalion (Note: Formed from 106th and 108th Provisional Battalions)				
33rd (City of London) Battalion London Regiment (Rifle Brigade) (Note: Formed in June 1918 and went to the Western Front in the last months of the war.) (Note: Absorbed the surviving cadre of 7th Bn Rifle Brigade and joined 14th (Light) Division.)				
34th (County of London) Battalion, London Regiment (King's Royal Rifle Corps) (Note: Absorbed the cadre of 7th Bn Kings Royal Rifle Corps, and joined 16th (Irish) Division)				

== See also ==
- London Regiment (1993–2022)

== Sources ==
- Becke, Archibald F. (1937). Order of Battle of Divisions Part 2B. The 2nd-Line Territorial Force Divisions (57th–69th) with The Home-Service Divisions (71st–73rd) and 74th and 75th Divisions. London: HMSO. OCLC 4405016.
- Becke, Archibald F. (1938). Order of Battle of Divisions Part 3A. New Army Divisions (9–26). London: HMSO. OCLC 4405016.
- Grey, Major W.E., (2002) 2nd City of London Regiment (Royal Fusiliers) in the Great War 1914–19, Westminster: Regimental Headquarters, 1929/Uckfield: Naval & Military Press, ISBN 978-1-843423-69-0
- Grimwade, Captain F. Clive, (2002) The War History of the 4th Battalion The London Regiment (Royal Fusiliers) 1914–1919, London: Regimental Headquarters, 1922/Uckfield, Naval & Military Press, ISBN 978-1-843423-63-8.
- Osborne, Mike (2012). Defending London: A Military History from Conquest to Cold War. History Press. ISBN 978-0752479316.
