= Kenneth Pestell =

English cricketer (1931–2021)

Personal information
- Full name: Kenneth Frederick Pestell
- Born: 7 May 1931; Edmonton, Middlesex, England
- Died: 28 December 2021 (aged 90); London, England
- Batting: Right-handed
- Bowling: Right-arm medium

Career statistics
Competition	First-class
Matches	1
Runs scored	37
Batting average	18.50
100s/50s	–/–
Top score	21
Balls bowled	30
Wickets	0
Bowling average	–
5 wickets in innings	–
10 wickets in match	–
Best bowling	–
Catches/stumpings	–/–
- Source: Cricinfo, 19 June 2019

Kenneth Frederick Pestell (7 May 1931 – 28 December 2021) was an English first-class cricketer.

== Biography ==
A banker by profession, Pestell played a single first-class cricket match for D. R. Jardine's XI against Oxford University at Eastbourne in 1957. Batting twice in the match, Pestell was dismissed for 16 runs by Robert Wilson in the D. R. Jardine's XI first-innings, while in their second-innings he was dismissed for 21 runs by Ian Gibson. He also bowled five wicket-less overs in the match with his right-arm medium pace bowling.

Pestell died in London on 28 December 2021, aged 90.
