= Jimmy Smy =

English footballer

Personal information
- Full name: James Smy
- Date of birth: 24 November 1907
- Place of birth: Edmonton, England
- Date of death: 29 July 1997 (aged 89)
- Place of death: Brisbane, Australia
- Position: Inside left

Senior career*
Years	Team	Apps	(Gls)
- Hampstead Town
1928–1930	Tottenham Hotspur	17	(6)
- Sittingbourne
- * Club domestic league appearances and goals

James Smy (24 November 1907 – 29 July 1997) was an English professional footballer who played for Hampstead Town, Tottenham Hotspur and Sittingbourne.

== Football career ==
Smy joined Tottenham Hotspur after playing for Non league club Hampstead Town. The inside left scored six goals in 17 appearances for the Lilywhites between 1928 and 1930. After leaving White Hart Lane, Smy played for Sittingbourne where he ended his playing career.
