= 10th (County of London) Battalion (Hackney), London Regiment =

10th (County of London) Battalion, London Regiment (Hackney) 10th London Regiment (Hackney), The Rifle Brigade 5th (Hackney) Battalion, Royal Berkshire Regiment (Princess Charlotte of Wales's) 648th Heavy Anti-Aircraft Regiment, Royal Artillery (Royal Berkshire)
- Active: 1912-1955
- Allegiance: United Kingdom
- Branch: Territorial Force/Territorial Army
- Type: Infantry; Beach Group; Bank Group
- Role: Territorial Army
- Size: Battalion; 3 Battalions (First World War); 2 Battalions (Second World War)
- Part of: London Regiment; Rifle Brigade; Royal Berkshire Regiment; Royal Artillery
- Garrison/HQ: The Grove, Hackney (1912-1929); Hilman Street, Hackney (1929-1955)

10th (County of London) Battalion, London Regiment (Hackney) was a battalion of the London Regiment, an all-Territorial Force regiment in the British Army. The battalion existed between 1912 and 1955 and after World War I was re-affiliated to the Rifle Brigade, and later to the Royal Berkshire Regiment and Royal Artillery.

Throughout its existence, the battalion was nicknamed The Hackney Gurkhas or the Cockney Gurkhas. It's not clear which shared traits gave rise to the nickname, but some sources emphasise the soldier's short stature, resulting from a malnourished upbringing in some of the country's poorest districts. Whatever the origin, the Eastenders were flattered by being likened to their tough far eastern counterparts and proudly adopted the term, ensuring it survived through both world wars and beyond.

== History ==
=== Origin in the Essex Regiment ===
From 1860 to 1912, Hackney was part of the recruiting district of the 7th Battalion, Essex Regiment. Hackney provided three of the battalion's eight companies, Leyton and Walthamstow two each, and West Ham one. The establishment of a recruitment district spanning the Lower Lea was anomalous in that Hackney (unlike Leyton, Walthamstow and West Ham) was part of the Tower Hamlets (or Tower Division) of Middlesex, rather than Essex. From 1912 onward, Hackney raised its own battalion with the Hackney companies of the 7th Essex transferred over to form the core of the new unit. The 7th Essex struggled to replace their Hackney comrades and were still understrength at the start of the First World War.

=== 1912-1918 ===
The new battalion was formed in 1912 to replace the London Regiment's disbanded 10th (County of London) Battalion (Paddington Rifles) and took over its battalion numeral.

Now demolished, the new battalion's drill hall was sited on The Grove in Hackney. In September 1914, a 2/10th Battalion London Regiment was formed as part of 2/2nd London Brigade in 2/1st London Division, with the existing regiment renamed 1/10th Battalion. On its mobilisation, in August 1914, 1/0th Battalion moved to Bullswater Camp near Pirbright then the following month to Crowborough - 2/9th Battalion joined it at Crowborough that November.

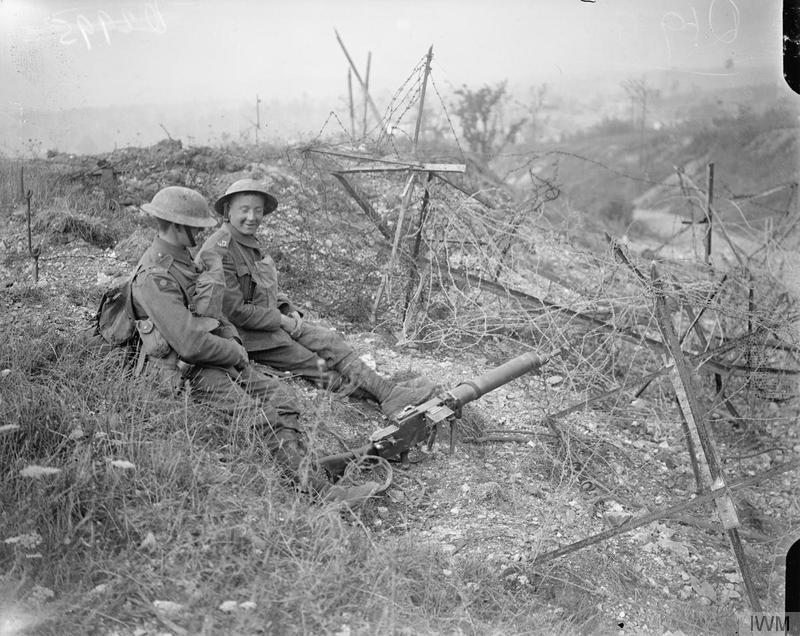
A German machine gun captured by men of the 2/10th Battalion, London Regiment (Hackney), shown in its position of fire, near Sailly Laurette, 8 August 1918.

1/10th formed part of 3rd London Brigade, itself part of 1st London Division - that brigade was renamed 162nd Brigade in 54th (East Anglian) Division the following year. The battalion sailed from Plymouth for Gallipoli in late July 1915 with the rest of its brigade, stopping at Mudros en route and landing at Suvla Bay on 11 August 1915. It was evacuated from Gallipoli that December and stationed in Egypt for the rest of the war. A 3/10th Battalion was formed in 1915.

On 7 July 1916, 1/10th and 3/10th Battalions London Regiment were both transferred to the corps of the Rifle Brigade whilst retaining their London Regiment affiliation. 1/10th kept its old name whilst 3/10th absorbed 3rd/25th Battalion London Regiment and was renamed 10th (Reserve) Battalion. 2/10th and 3/10th Battalions were disbanded by or at the war's end. The 1/10th, 2/10th and 3/10th Battalions' First World War memorial is at the Church of St John-at-Hackney.

=== 1920-1955 ===
During the Territorial Force's 1920-1921 conversion into the Territorial Army, 1/10th Battalion's transfer to the Rifle Brigade was formalised and it was renamed 10th London Regiment (Hackney), The Rifle Brigade. In 1929, it was transferred again, this time becoming 5th (Hackney) Battalion, Royal Berkshire Regiment (Princess Charlotte of Wales's) and moving its headquarters to Hilman Street in Hackney.

In June 1939, elements of 5th Battalion were split off to create a duplicate 7th (Stoke Newington) Battalion, which served on home defence until disbanded in 1942. On the outbreak of war, 5th Battalion was serving with its duplicate 7th Battalion in the 161st (Essex) Infantry Brigade, 54th (East Anglian) Division.

5th Battalion was an ordinary infantry battalion until 1942, when it joined No. 8 Beach Group, landing with the 3rd Canadian Infantry Division at Juno Beach early on D-Day. It fought as infantry on D-Day, with a particular focus on mopping up by-passed strongpoints (such as pill-boxes) and other resistance so troops landing later could land unhindered and push on inland.

After D-Day, the focus switched to its Beach Group duties, which was mainly stevedore work, but also included marking minefields, processing prisoners, the wounded and the dead. The battalion continued to take casualties through artillery, airstrikes, mines and accidents.

The battalion continued in this role till July\August 1944, when it was largely broken up, with whole platoons sent to reinforce battalions that had experienced heavy casualties in the Battle of Normandy. Many were sent to the 4th and 5th Battalions of the Wiltshire Regiment, others to the 2nd and 4th Dorset Regiment and other elements to Royal Berkshire battalions serving in the far east. The transfers and casualties left only a small rump unit of 16 officers and 136 other ranks by August 1944. In December 1944, they were reinforced by 380 men of the low medical category, but remained well understrength. They were used as a mobile column during the Battle of the Bulge that winter.

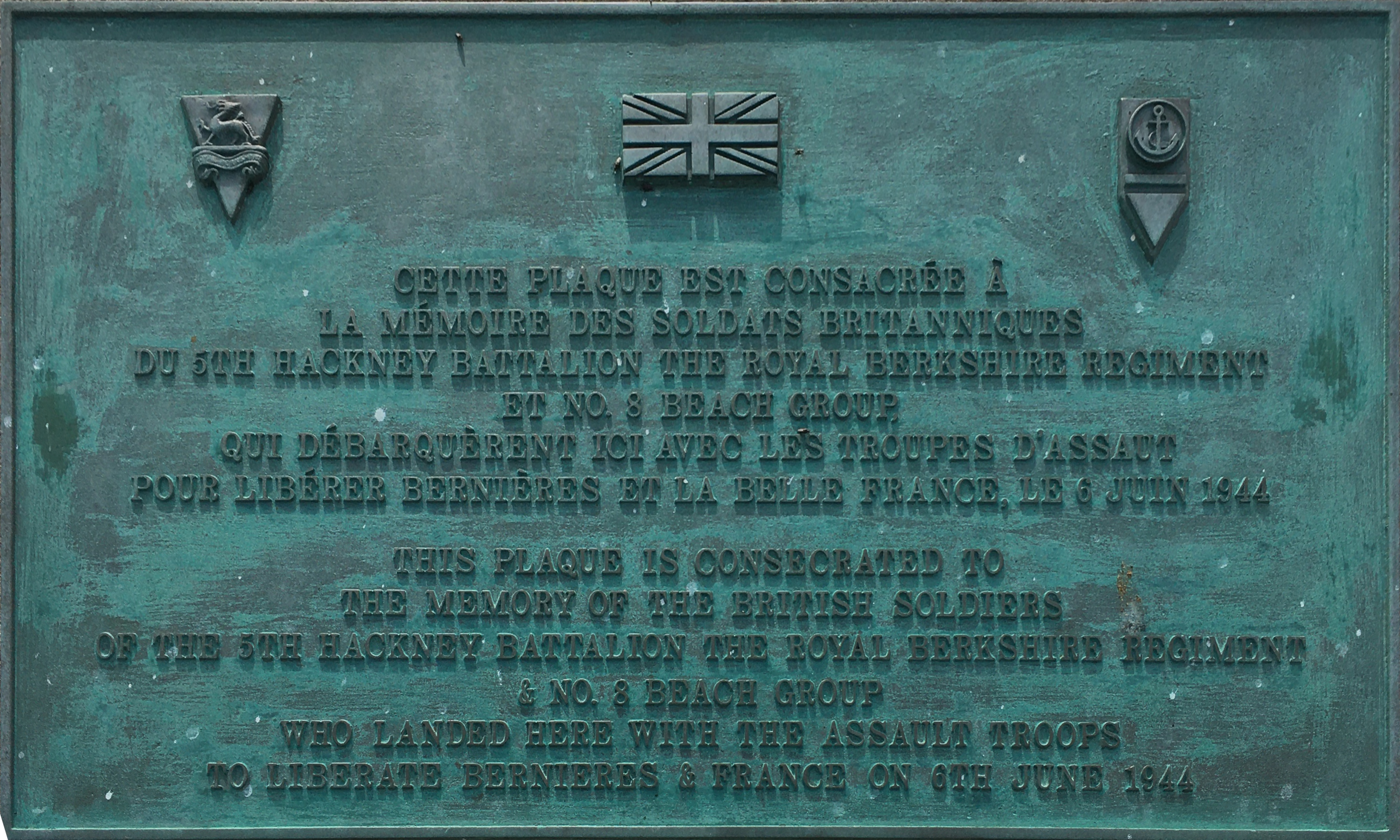
Memorial to the Hackney Battalion at Bernières-sur-Mer

In February 1945, 5th Battalion was re-designated as a Bank Group and in March assisted 15th (Scottish) Infantry Division in its crossing of the Rhine, in the Xanten area, between Wesel and Rees, with two Hackney companies were in the first wave across the river. It was still in the Xanten area, on garrison duty, when VE-Day came soon after. The battalion was disbanded at Hildesheim in June 1945. 5th (Hackney) Battalion was revived as 648th Heavy Anti-Aircraft Regiment, Royal Artillery (Royal Berkshire) in 1947 before finally being disbanded in 1955.

== Battle honours ==
=== First World War ===
==== 1/10th Battalion ====
- Suvla
- Landing at Suvla
- Scimitar Hill
- Gallipoli 1915
- Egypt 1915-17
- Gaza
- El Mughar
- Nebi Samwil
- Jaffa
- Tell' Asur
- Megiddo
- Sharon
- Palestine 1917-18

==== 2/10th Battalion ====
- Ypres 1917
- Menin Road
- Polygon Wood
- Passchendaele
- Villers Bretonneux
- Amiens
- Somme 1918
- Albert 1918
- Bapaume 1918
- Hindenburg Line
- Epéhy
- Pursuit to Mons
- France and Flanders 1917-18

=== Second World War ===
- Normandy Landing
- Rhine
- North West Europe 1944-45 (Note: These three battle honours were transferred to the Royal Gloucestershire, Berkshire and Wiltshire Regiment in 1944 and then to The Rifles in 2007.)
