= 33rd Cavalry =

33rd Cavalry may refer to:

== Divisions ==
- 33rd Cavalry Division (Soviet Union)
- 33rd Waffen Cavalry Division of the SS (3rd Hungarian)

== Regiments and battalions ==
- 33rd Cavalry Regiment (United States)
- 33rd Texas Cavalry Regiment, Confederate States Army
- 33rd Virginia Cavalry Battalion, Confederate States Army
- 33rd Queen Victoria's Own Light Cavalry

== See also ==
- 33rd Division (disambiguation)
- 33rd Brigade (disambiguation)
- 33rd Regiment (disambiguation)
- 33rd (disambiguation)
