= XXXIII Corps =

33 Corps, 33rd Corps, Thirty Third Corps, or XXXIII Corps may refer to:

- XXXIII Corps (British India)
- XXXIII Army Corps (Wehrmacht), Germany
- XXXIII Corps (India)
- 33rd Army Corps (Russian Empire)
- 33rd Army Corps (Soviet Union)
- 33rd (1st Partick) Lanarkshire Rifle Volunteer Corps, United Kingdom
- XXXIII Corps (United States)

== See also ==
- List of military corps by number
- 33rd Army (disambiguation)
- 33rd Battalion (disambiguation)
- 33rd Brigade (disambiguation)
- 33rd Division (disambiguation)
- 33rd Regiment (disambiguation)
- 33rd Squadron (disambiguation)
- 33rd (disambiguation)
