= 33rd =

33rd is the ordinal form of the number 33. 33rd or thirty-third may also refer to:

- A fraction, 1/33, equal to one of 33 equal parts

== Geography ==
- 33rd meridian east, a line of longitude
- 33rd meridian west, a line of longitude
- 33rd parallel north, a circle of latitude
- 33rd parallel south, a circle of latitude
- 33rd Street (disambiguation)

== Military ==
- 33rd Army (disambiguation)
- 33rd Battalion (disambiguation)
- 33rd Brigade (disambiguation)
- 33rd Division (disambiguation)
- 33rd Regiment (disambiguation)
- 33rd Squadron (disambiguation)

== Other ==
- 33rd Amendment
- 33rd century
- 33rd century BC

== See also ==
- 33 (disambiguation)
- 33 1/3 (disambiguation)
- 33rd Degree, in Scottish Rite Masonry
