= 33rd Army =

33rd Army may refer to:

- Thirty-Third Army (Japan), Imperial Japanese Army
- 33rd Army (Soviet Union)
- 33rd Guards Rocket Army, Soviet Union/Russia

== See also ==
- List of armies by number
- XXXIII Corps (disambiguation)
- 33rd Division (disambiguation)
- 33rd Brigade (disambiguation)
- 33rd Regiment (disambiguation)
- 33rd Battalion (disambiguation)
- 33rd Squadron (disambiguation)
- 33rd (disambiguation)
