= 33rd Division =

33rd Division or 33rd Infantry Division may refer to:

== Infantry divisions ==
- 33rd Infantry Division (Bangladesh)
- 33rd Army Division (2nd Formation) (People's Republic of China)
- 33rd Infantry Division (France)
- 33rd Division (German Empire)
- 33rd Reserve Division (German Empire)
- 33rd Infantry Division (Wehrmacht), Germany
- 33rd Waffen Grenadier Division of the SS Charlemagne, Germany
- 33rd Al-Mahdi Division, Iran
- 33rd Infantry Division "Acqui", Kingdom of Italy
- 33rd Division (Imperial Japanese Army)
- 33rd Infantry Division (Poland)
- 33rd Infantry Division (Russian Empire)
- 33rd Kuban Rifle Division, Russian Soviet Republic
- 33rd Guards Motor Rifle Division, Soviet Union, earlier the 33rd Guards Mechanized Division
- 33rd Guards Rifle Division, Soviet Union
- 33rd Motor Rifle Division, Soviet Union
- 33rd Rifle Division, Soviet Union
- 33rd Division (Spain)
- 33rd Division (United Kingdom)
- 33rd Infantry Division (United States)
- 33rd Division (Yugoslav Partisans)

== Other divisions ==
- 33rd Waffen Cavalry Division of the SS (3rd Hungarian), Germany
- 33rd Armoured Division, India
- 33rd Air Division, United States

== See also ==
- List of military divisions by number
- 33rd Army (disambiguation)
- XXXIII Corps (disambiguation)
- 33rd Brigade (disambiguation)
- 33rd Regiment (disambiguation)
- 33rd Battalion (disambiguation)
- 33rd Squadron (disambiguation)
