= Château de Hornoy =

French castle

- Hornoy-le-Bourg, Hauts-de-France, France

Site information
- Owner: Balliol family

Location
- Coordinates: 49°50′46″N 1°54′08″E

Château de Hornoy was a castle near Hornoy-le-Bourg, Hauts-de-France, France. It once belonged to the English and Scottish Balliol family.

The castle of Hornoy was forfeited to the French Crown in 1330 and was granted to Ferry de Picquigny, remaining in the Picquigny family until 1365, when it passed to Raoul de Coucy.
