= 33 =

33 may refer to:

- 33 (number), the natural number following 32 and preceding 34
- 33 BC
- AD 33
- 1933
- 2033

== Science ==
- Arsenic, a chemical element
- 33 Polyhymnia, an asteroid in the asteroid belt

== Music ==
- La 33, a Colombian salsa music band

=== Albums ===
- 33 (Luis Miguel album) (2003)
- 33 (Southpacific album) (1998)
- 33 (Wanessa album) (2016)

=== Songs ===
- "33" (song), by Lali and Dillom, 2025
- "Thirty-Three" (song), a 1995 song by the Smashing Pumpkins
- "33", a 2002 song by Coheed and Cambria
- "33", a song by Conrad Sewell from his 2023 album Precious
- "33", a song by Sinéad O’Connor from her 2007 album Theology
- "33", a 2020 song by Polo G
- "Thirty Three", a song by Karma to Burn from the album Almost Heathen, 2001

== Television ==
- El 33, a Catalan television channel
- "33" (Battlestar Galactica), an episode of Battlestar Galactica

== Other uses ==
- Los 33, the miners involved in the 2010 Copiapó mining accident
  - The 33, a 2015 film based on the Copiapó mining accident
- Thirty Three (film), a 1965 Soviet comedy film by Georgi Daneliya
- +33, the international calling code for France
- 33, a label printed on Rolling Rock beer bottles
- Alfa Romeo 33, a small family car
- DAF 33, a compact car

== See also ==
- 33rd (disambiguation)
- 33 1/3 (disambiguation)
- Club 33, a set of private clubs in Disney Parks
- List of highways numbered 33
- Treinta y Tres, a city in Uruguay
