= 33rd Battalion =

33rd Battalion or 33rd Infantry Battalion may refer to:

- 33rd Battalion (Australia), a unit of the Australian Army
- 2/33rd Battalion (Australia), a unit of the Australian Army that served during World War II
- 33rd Battalion, CEF, a unit of the Canadian Expeditionary Force during World War I
- 33 Battalion (SWATF), a unit of the South West Africa Territorial Force
- Reserve Police Battalion 33, an auxiliary unit of the Third Reich
- Schutzmannschaft Battalion 33, an auxiliary unit of the Third Reich
- 33rd Battalion Virginia Cavalry

== See also ==
- 33rd Division (disambiguation)
- 33rd Brigade (disambiguation)
- 33rd Regiment (disambiguation)
- 33rd Squadron (disambiguation)
