= 33 Revolutions per Minute =

33 Revolutions per Minute may refer to:

- 33 Revolutions per Minute (album), a 1993 album by Marxman
- 33 Revolutions per Minute (book), a 2011 book by Dorian Lynskey

== See also ==
- 33 1/3 RPM, the playing speed of certain records
