= 167th Brigade =

167th Brigade may refer to:

- 167th (1st London) Brigade, United Kingdom
- 167th (Camberwell) Howitzer Brigade, Royal Field Artillery, United Kingdom

== See also ==
- 167th Regiment (disambiguation)
