= Dulwich Public Baths =

Leisure centre in Southwark, London, England

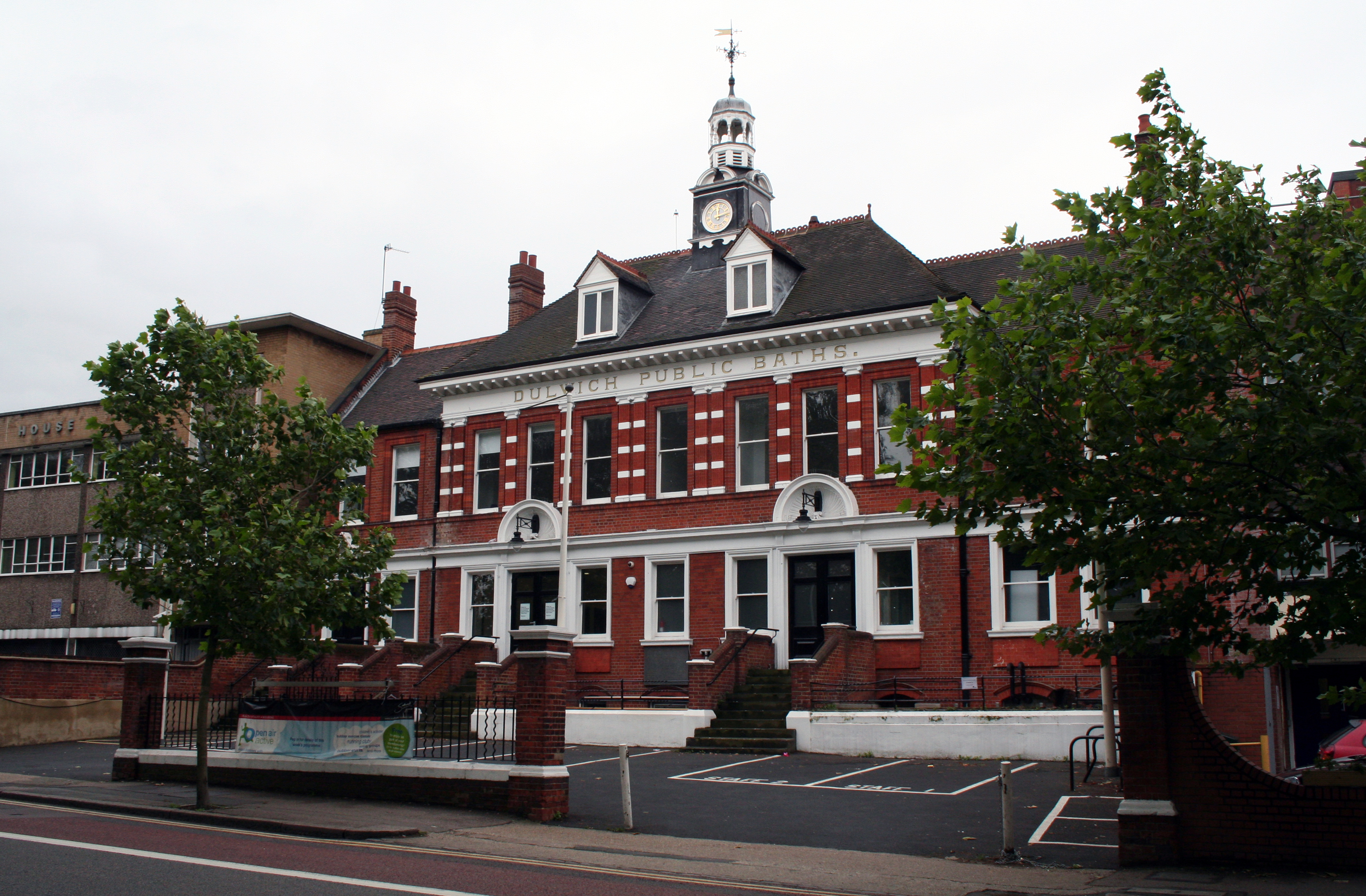
- Interactive map of Dulwich Public Baths
- Location: 2b Crystal Palace Road, London, SE22 9HB
- Coordinates: 51.460977°N 0.072284°W
- Operator: Southwark Leisure
- Facilities: Gym, studios, swimming pool

Construction
- Opened: 25 June 1892
- Architect: Spalding & Cross

Website
- Official website

Dulwich Public Baths (also Dulwich Leisure Centre) is a swimming pool and gym operated by Southwark Council in East Dulwich, South London. It opened in 1892, and is London's oldest public baths to have remained in continuous operation. The baths are listed Grade II on the National Heritage List for England.

== Description ==
The original sign of "Dulwich Public Baths" is on the front of the building though there has been significant, if sympathetic, redevelopment inside. There are two original entrances on the front separating men and women. The entrance is raised using steps up to the main doors to provide a high basement where a laundry was originally in operation.

The main pool was boarded over in 1982 (now the main gym area) leaving the second pool still in operation.

== History ==
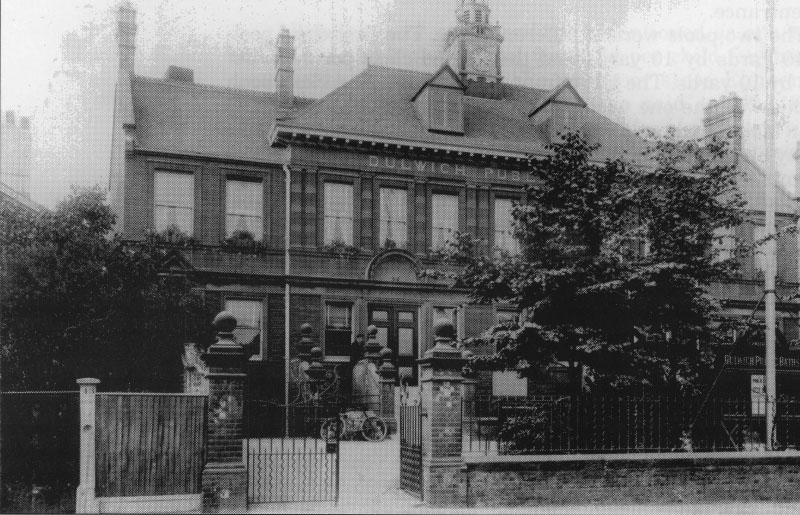
Dulwich Baths in 1896.

The Baths opened to the public on 25 June 1892. Dulwich was the first baths of seven baths designed by Spalding & Cross. The foundation stone was put in place in September 1891 but due to various delays including changes to drainage plans and a union dispute over the quality of lime being used in the concrete, on analysis found to be up to standard, the opening was not until well into the following year.

Charges were 6d for a 1st class swim and 2d for 2nd class (class being the choice between the main and second pools) with charges for schools varying between 3d to 1d depending on the agreement with each school. The basic swimming charge was to stay at 6d until 1957.

The Baths were available for hire for various functions including dances, indoor sports and functions.

=== First World War ===
The baths were closed in 1914 for hospital and Red Cross work during World War I. The War Refugees Committee were allowed to use it for housing Belgian refugees. In 1915 the baths briefly return to public use but were then allocated for use of the Camberwell Gun Brigades (33rd Divisional Artillery). The Brigade vacated in July 1915 and the baths then were used for troop accommodation and housed two brigades of the Territorial Artillery from September 1915. Public swimming resumed in 1917. The baths were used as an unofficial shelter throughout the frequent air raids of 1917 and the Council installed red and green lights to show "take cover" and "all clear" in addition to the sirens.

=== Inter-war period ===
In 1937 two rinks for indoor bowling were introduced. Players were charged 6d an hour, or a rink could be reserved for 4s an hour.

=== Second World War ===
Location map for East Dulwich Baths.

War preparations in 1938–39 before World War II included laying floors over both swimming pools for use as First Aid posts and medical stores and equipment were brought in.

The fuel shortage in late 1939 led to the pool being closed over winter. In 1940 the pools were again planned to close for the winter but the Auxiliary Fire Service asked for the pool to be kept full for use when dealing with air raid damage. The Council decided to keep the pools open as a result and adapted the pools for Fire Brigade pumps.

A shortage of towels during war-time with an increase in wastage, suspected to be partly due to theft, led to a 5s deposit per towel.

=== Post war ===
On 13 March 1946, the Council decided to allow mixed bathing in all the Borough's pools.

From 1945, the dances resumed with a number of popular bands playing at the Baths including the Ted Heath Band and Bert Gutsall and his Orchestra. The Baths' grand piano was replaced in 1949 with a second hand Welmar boudoir grand. In 1950, the Council promoted official 'Carnival' dances for Christmas Eve, New Year's Eve, and St Patrick's Day, with numbers limited to 550 at a function.

== Modern refurbishment ==
In the 1990s, the Friends of Dulwich Baths lobbied Southwark Council for repairs and £250,000 was invested in various re-developments including removing the women's slipper baths. In 2007, a full renovation plan of £5 million was agreed with Fusion taking over operation of the building as a leisure complex.

From May 2009, the £6.2 million redevelopment (revised budget) started on site necessitating the closure of the pool and a temporary gym. The refurbishment finally completed 25 June 2011 having taken 5 years from start to finish. The formal reopening event was attended by local MP Tessa Jowell and East Dulwich councillor James Barber.

The gym was fully renovated in December 2024 as part of a £2 million borough-wide redevelopment of Southwark council-owned gyms and leisure facilities. The move followed insourcing of the gyms by Southwark Council in June 2023, ending the management of the centre by Everyone Active after bailing out the company during the COVID-19 pandemic.

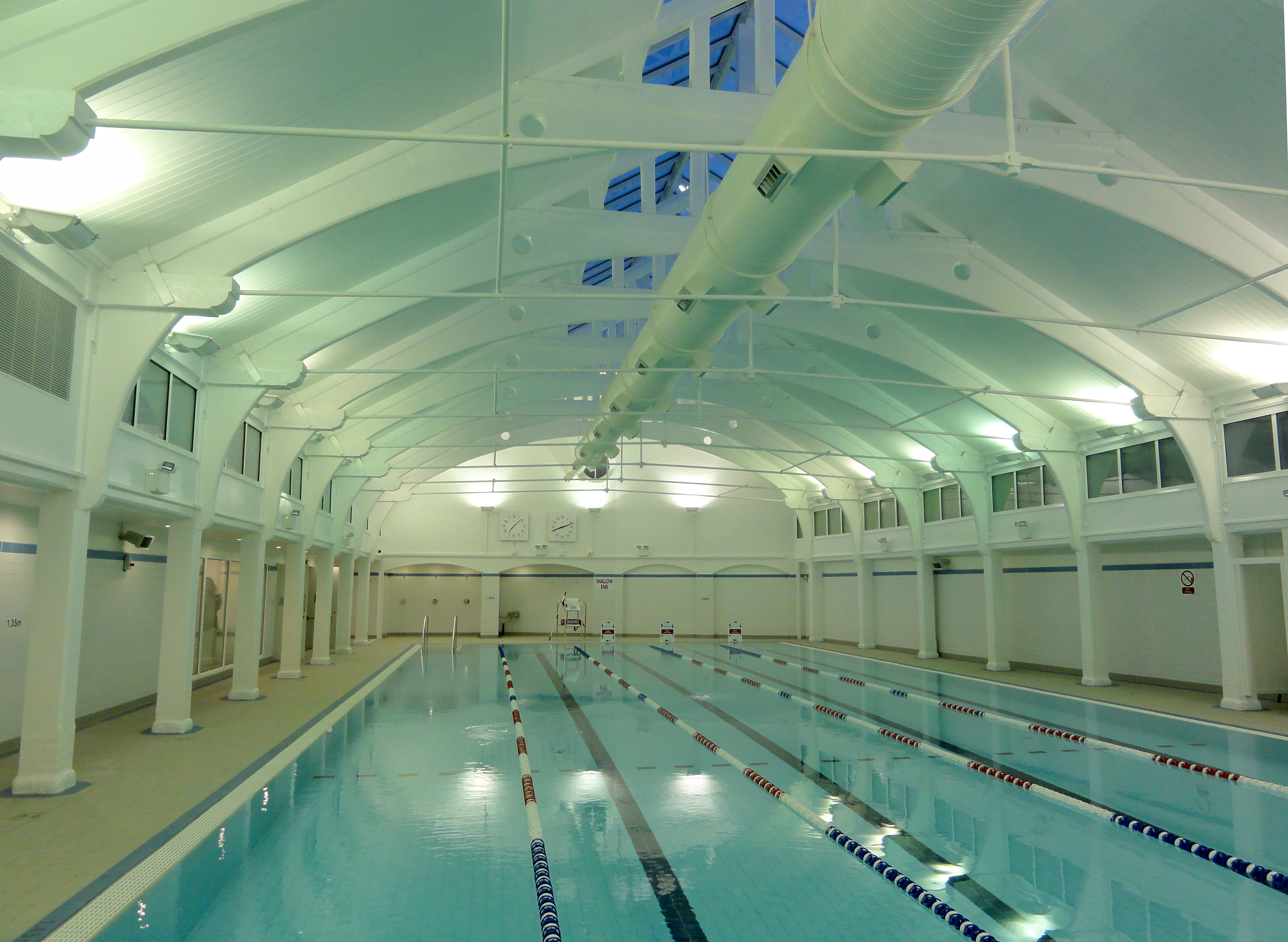
Swimming pool, reopened in September 2010.

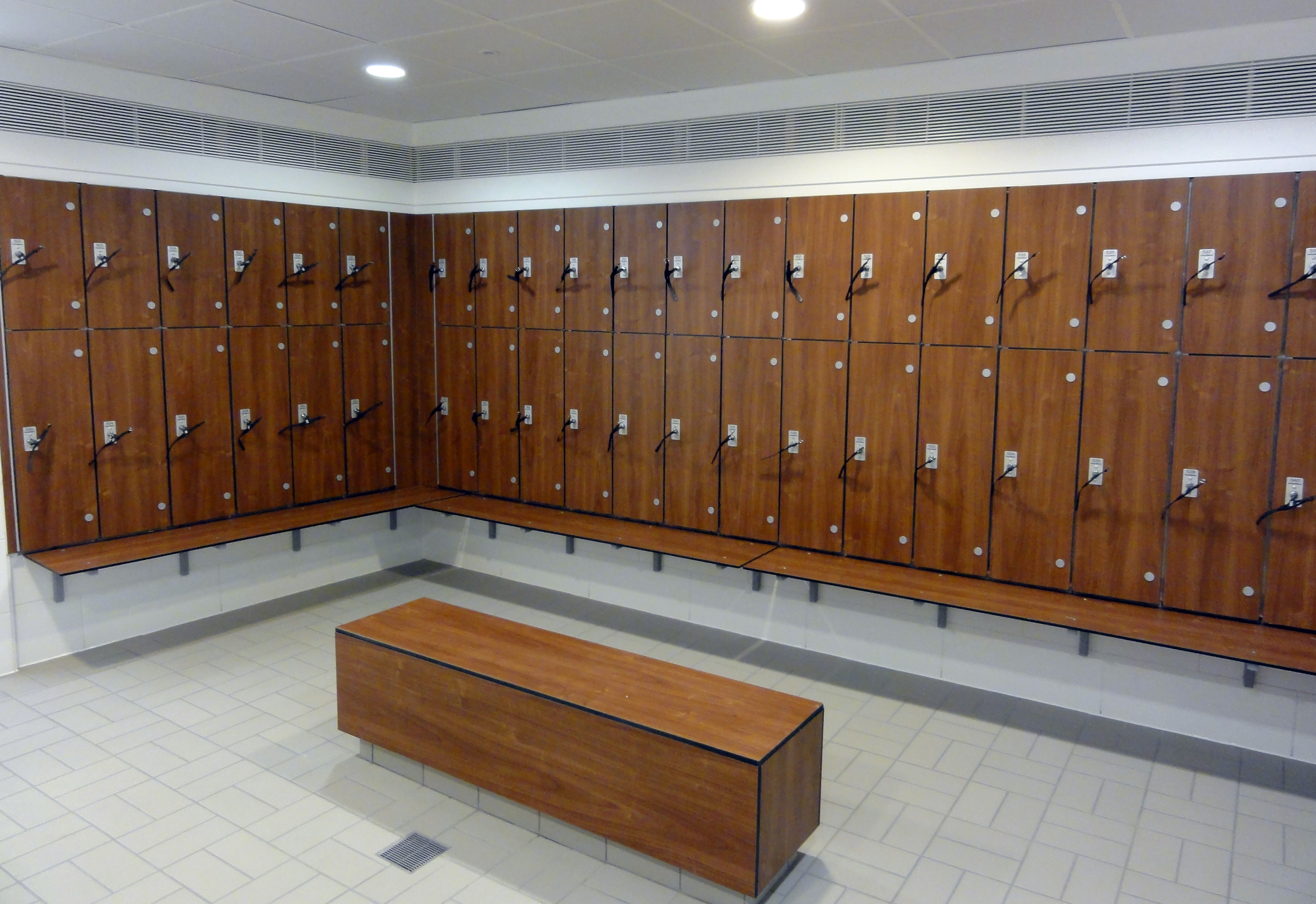
New changing rooms fittings, September 2010.

== See also ==
- History of the United Kingdom during World War I
