= 33rd Street station =

33rd Street station may refer to:

- 33rd Street station (CTA South Side Elevated), an elevated station in Chicago, Illinois
- 33rd Street station (IRT Lexington Avenue Line), a subway station in Manhattan, New York
- 33rd Street station (IRT Sixth Avenue Line), a former elevated station in Manhattan, New York
- 33rd Street station (PATH), a rapid transit station in Manhattan, New York
- 33rd Street station (SEPTA), a subway station in Philadelphia, Pennsylvania
- 33rd Street–Rawson Street station, a subway station in Queens, New York

== See also ==
- 33rd Street (disambiguation)
