= 33rd Reserve Division (German Empire) =

33rd Reserve Division (33. Reserve-Division)
- Active: 1914-1918
- Country: Prussia/Bavaria/Germany
- Branch: Army
- Type: Infantry
- Size: Approx. 15,000
- Engagements: World War I: Battle of the Frontiers, Battle of Verdun, Second Battle of the Aisne, Aisne Offensive, Champagne-Marne Offensive

The 33rd Reserve Division (33. Reserve-Division) was a unit of the Imperial German Army, in World War I. The division was formed on the mobilization of the German Army in August 1914. The division was disbanded in August 1918. The division began the war as part of the central reserve of Fortress Metz (Hauptreserve/Festung Metz).

Although designated a reserve division, it was initially composed of one active and one reserve infantry brigade. The active brigade was the 8th Bavarian Infantry Brigade, which had been detached from the 4th Bavarian Infantry Division. The rest of the division's troops came primarily from the Prussian Rhine Province and the Province of Westphalia.

== Combat chronicle ==
The 33rd Reserve Division began the war on the Western Front, where it fought in the Battle of the Frontiers and advanced to the Verdun region. From September 1914 to August 1916, it occupied the line in the region between the Meuse and Moselle Rivers. In late 1916, it suffered heavy losses in the later phases of the 1916 Battle of Verdun. After a few months in the trenches in Lorraine, it went to the Chemin des Dames region and fought in the Second Battle of the Aisne, also known as the Third Battle of Champagne (and to the Germans as the Double Battle on the Aisne and in the Champagne), and again suffered heavy losses. In September 1917, the division was transferred to the Eastern Front, arriving shortly before the December armistice on that front. It returned to the Western Front in January 1918, where it fought in several engagements, including the Aisne and the Champagne-Marne offensives against French and American forces, after which it was disbanded and its troops distributed to other divisions. Allied intelligence rated it as a good division in 1917, but before its dissolution in 1918, it was rated as fourth class.

== Order of battle on mobilization ==
The order of battle of the 33rd Reserve Division on mobilization was as follows:

- 8.Kgl. Bayerische Infanterie-Brigade
  - Kgl. Bayerisches 4. Infanterie-Regiment König Wilhelm von Württemberg
  - Kgl. Bayerisches 8. Infanterie-Regiment Großherzog Friedrich II. von Baden
- 66.Reserve-Infanterie-Brigade
  - Reserve-Infanterie-Regiment Nr. 67
  - Reserve-Infanterie-Regiment Nr. 130
- Reserve-Husaren-Regiment Nr. 2
- Ersatz-Abteilung/1. Lothringisches Feldartillerie-Regiment Nr. 33
- Ersatz-Abteilung/2. Lothringisches Feldartillerie-Regiment Nr. 34
- Ersatz-Abteilung/3. Lothringisches Feldartillerie-Regiment Nr. 69
- Ersatz-Abteilung/4. Lothringisches Feldartillerie-Regiment Nr. 70

In early August 1914, the following were also attached:

- I.Bataillon/Kgl. Bayerisches Reserve-Fußartillerie-Regiment Nr. 2
- II.Bataillon/Kgl. Bayerisches Reserve-Fußartillerie-Regiment Nr. 2
- 4.Kompanie/Kgl. Sächsisches 2. Pionier-Bataillon Nr. 22

== Order of battle on 10 October 1917 ==
The 33rd Reserve Division was triangularized in August 1916, when the 8th Bavarian Infantry Brigade was sent to the 14th Bavarian Infantry Division. This also made the division entirely Prussian in composition. Over the course of the war, other changes took place, including the formation of artillery and signals commands and a pioneer battalion. The order of battle on 10 October 1917 was as follows:

- 66. Reserve-Infanterie-Brigade
  - Reserve-Infanterie-Regiment Nr. 67
  - Reserve-Infanterie-Regiment Nr. 130
  - Infanterie-Regiment Nr. 364
- 6. Eskadron/Ulanen-Regiment Hennigs von Treffenfeld (Altmärkisches) Nr. 16
- Artillerie-Kommandeur 125
  - Reserve-Feldartillerie-Regiment Nr. 33
- Stab Pionier-Bataillon Nr. 333
  - 1. Ersatz-Kompanie/2. Lothringisches Pionier-Bataillon Nr. 20
  - 1. Landwehr-Pionier-Kompanie/IV. Armeekorps
  - Minenwerfer-Kompanie Nr. 233
- Divisions-Nachrichten-Kommandeur 433
