= 33rd Street =

33rd Street may refer to:

== Transportation ==
- 33rd Street (Baltimore), Maryland, an east–west parkway
- 33rd Street Railroad Bridge in Pittsburgh, Pennsylvania
- Thirty-third Street Bridge in Philadelphia, Pennsylvania

== Other uses ==
- 33rd Street Records, an independent record label based in Greenbrae, California

== See also ==
- 33rd Street station
