= 33rd Division (Yugoslav Partisans) =

Yugoslav Partisan military division formed in 1944

33rd Croatia Division
- Flag of Democratic Federal Yugoslavia (used by the Partisans)
- Active: 1944–1945
- Country: Democratic Federal Yugoslavia
- Branch: Yugoslav Partisan Army
- Type: Infantry
- Size: 1,165 (upon formation)
- Engagements: World War II in Yugoslavia

Commanders
- Notable commanders: Josip Antolović

The 33rd Croatia Division (Serbo-Croatian Latin: Tridesettreća hrvatska divizija) was a Yugoslav Partisan division formed on 19 January 1944 in Koprivnica. It was formed from the 1st and 2nd Moslavina Brigades which had a total of 1,165 fighters. The division was a part of the 9th Corps and it operated in Zagorje, Kalnik and Moslavina regions.
