= 33 1/3 (disambiguation) =

33 1/3 is a series of books written about important and/or seminal music albums.

33 1/3 may also refer to:

- Thirty Three & 1/3, an album by George Harrison
- 33 1/3 (album), an album by John Farnham
- 33 and a Third, an album by Def Dee

== See also ==
- Naked Gun 33 1/3: The Final Insult, a 1994 comedy film and the third film in The Naked Gun series
- 33 1/3 RPM (disambiguation), the playing speed, in rotations per minute, of some records
