= 33rd (Camberwell) Divisional Artillery =

Artillery formation of the British Army

- Royal Artillery cap badge
- Active: 1915–19
- Country: United Kingdom
- Branch: Kitchener's Army
- Role: Field Artillery
- Size: 2–4 Artillery brigades
- Part of: 33rd Division
- Garrison/HQ: Camberwell
- Nickname: Camberwell Gun Brigade
- Patron: Mayor of Camberwell
- Engagements: Battle of the Somme; Battle of Arras; Third Battle of Ypres; German spring offensive Hundred Days Offensive

Commanders
- Notable commanders: Lt-Col Sir Frederick Hall, 1st Baronet

Insignia
- Identification symbol: 33rd Division formation sign

The 33rd Divisional Artillery (33rd DA), popularly known as the Camberwell Gun Brigade, was a Royal Artillery force raised as part of 'Kitchener's Army' in early 1915. Recruited in the Borough of Camberwell, South London, the units served with the 'Pals battalions' of the 33rd Division on the Western Front for three years. They also supported other formations when 33rd Division was out of the line. The batteries saw action at the Somme, Arras, and Ypres, suffering heavy casualties. They were particularly distinguished defending against the German spring offensive of 1918, and continued through the victorious Allied Hundred Days Offensive.

== Background ==
On 6 August 1914, less than 48 hours after Britain's declaration of war, Parliament sanctioned an increase of 500,000 men for the Regular British Army, and the newly appointed Secretary of State for War, Earl Kitchener of Khartoum issued his famous call to arms: 'Your King and Country Need You', urging the first 100,000 volunteers to come forward. This group of six divisions with supporting arms became known as Kitchener's First New Army, or 'K1'. The flood of volunteers overwhelmed the ability of the army to absorb and organise them, and by the time the Fifth New Army (K5) was authorised on 10 December 1914, many of the units were being organised as 'Pals battalions' under the auspices of mayors and corporations of towns up and down the country.

The six K5 divisions were to be numbered 37th to 42nd, but the War Office (WO) then decided to convert the K4 battalions into reserve units to train reinforcements for the K1–K3 units, and on 27 April the K5 divisions were renumbered to take up the designations of the K4 formations. The short-lived 40th Division thus became 33rd Division. The division's original infantry units were Pals battalions raised by London regiments (particularly the Public Schools Battalions and Sportsmen's Battalions), and the Royal Artillery (RA) brigades were raised in Camberwell, South London.

== Recruitment ==
On 14 January 1915 the WO authorised Major Frederick Hall, MP for Dulwich, and the Mayor of Camberwell to raise a brigade of the Royal Field Artillery (RFA), to be numbered CLVI (156th). The local response was so prompt that in March another brigade was raised, numbered CLXII (162nd). The WO was then told that there were still enough would-be recruits in the Camberwell neighbourhood to raise the whole artillery for an infantry division. (Note: The artillery component of a British infantry division during World War I was commanded by a brigadier-general and was effectively a brigade, but was never referred to as such because 'brigade' was the term used by the Royal Artillery to designate a regimental-sized unit, of which there were initially four in each division.) At once, authority was given to recruit the two remaining RFA brigades, CLXVI (166th Bde) and CLXVII (H) (167th Howitzer Bde), the 126th Heavy Battery of the Royal Garrison Artillery, and the Divisional Ammunition Column (DAC). Major Hall himself was the first commanding officer (CO) of CLVI Bde. All the men came from Camberwell and nearby Dulwich, and the units were complete by 1 June:

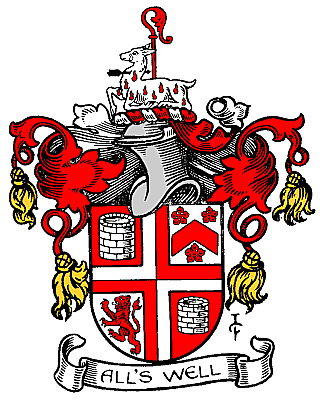
Coat of arms of the Borough of Camberwell

33rd Divisional Artillery

- CLVI (Camberwell) Brigade, RFA
- CLXII (Camberwell) Brigade, RFA
- CLXVI (Camberwell) Brigade, RFA
- CLXVII (Camberwell) Howitzer Brigade, RFA
- 33rd (Camberwell) Divisional Ammunition Column, RFA
- 126th (Camberwell) Heavy Battery and Ammunition Column, RGA

Each New Army RFA brigade consisted of four 4-gun batteries (designated A, B, C and D) and a Brigade Ammunition Column (BAC).

== Training ==
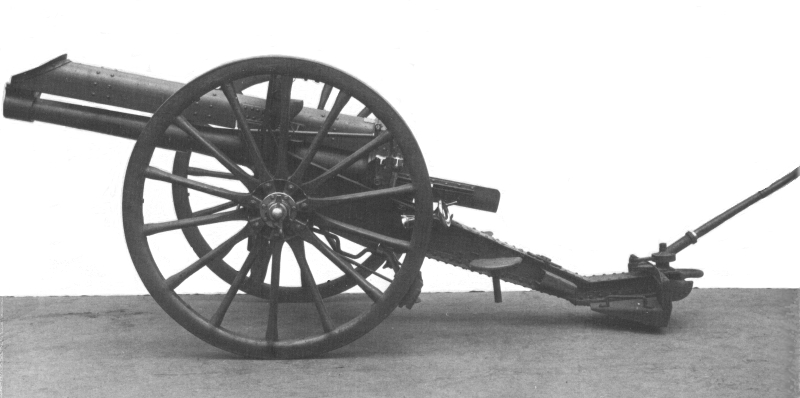
15-pounder gun issued for training.

33rd Divisional Artillery trained at the Grove Vale Depot in East Dulwich, while specialists were sent for courses to the Royal Artillery Barracks at Woolwich, St John's Wood Barracks and Larkhill Camp. At first there were no uniforms and they only had three obsolete 15-pounder guns and dummy loaders with which to learn the rudiments of gunnery. The men of CLVI Bde and the DAC lived at home, CLXII Bde was housed at Gordon's Brewery, CLXVI Bde at the Tramway Depot at Peckham, and CLXVII (H) Bde partly at home and partly at Dulwich Public Baths.

In July 1915 the 33rd Division began to assemble at Clipstone Camp, Nottinghamshire, but the artillery remained at Camberwell where four modern 18-pounder field guns arrived, together with the first 4.5-inch howitzer for CLXVII (H) Bde. In August the division moved to Salisbury Plain for final battle training, the artillery arriving at Bulford Camp between 5 and 10 August. The units were formally taken over by the military authorities on 12 August.

On 4 November the 33rd Division was ordered to prepare to embark for France. However, gunners required longer training, so the division's infantry joined the British Expeditionary Force (BEF) in France with the divisional artillery of the 54th (East Anglian) Division of the Territorial Force (TF) temporarily attached. Orders for 33rd DA to proceed to France were received on 6 December, and the batteries began to entrain at Amesbury for Southampton, 51 trains in all being required to move the batteries and ammunition columns.

== Western Front ==
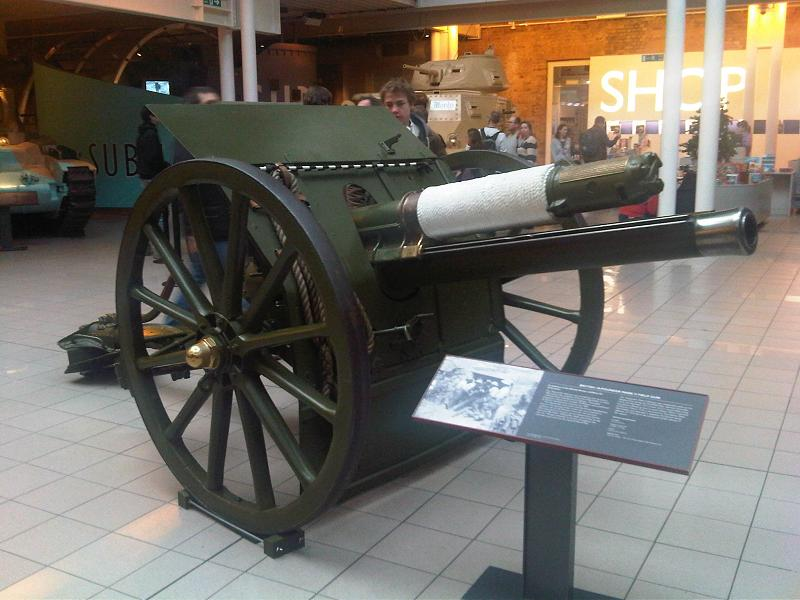
18-Pounder field gun preserved at the Imperial War Museum.

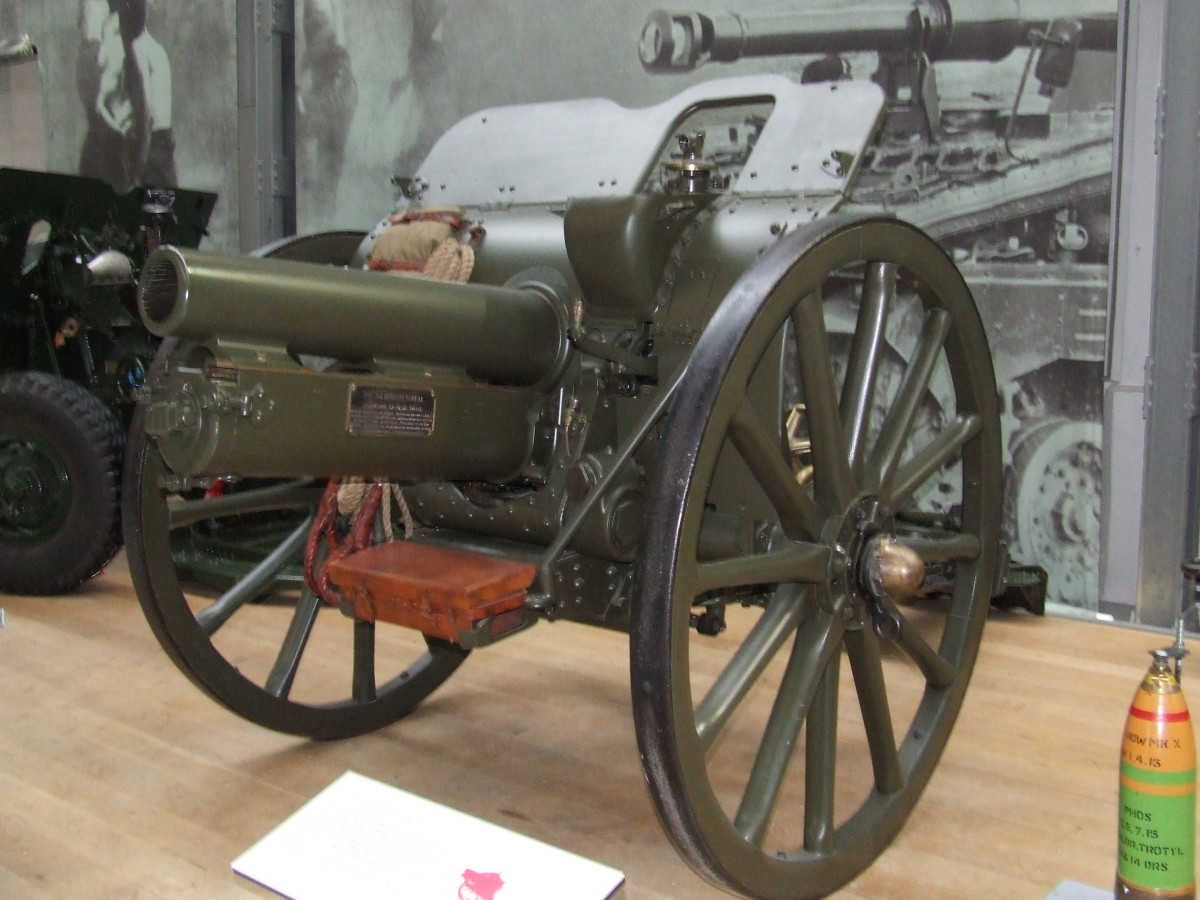
4.5-inch Howitzer at the Royal Artillery Museum.

33rd Divisional Artillery (less 126th Heavy Battery) embarked at Southampton on 12–13 December 1915, and concentrated at Aire and Thiennes on 16 December to rejoin their division. 54th Divisional Artillery left on 12 December and embarked at Marseille to join their own division in Egypt.

Each brigade of 33rd DA sent successive parties up to the line to be attached to the artillery of 2nd Division so that between 18 December and 11 January 1916 all the personnel received four days' experience with a front line battery. From mid-January the batteries began to relieve those of 2nd and 12th (Eastern) Division for six-day spells, continuing their training when not in the line. C/CLXVII (H) Battery went into the line in its own right on 30 December, attached to I Corps' Heavy Artillery for Counter-battery (CB) duties. A/CLXII and A/CLXVI Batteries joined it on 13 February, before the whole of 33rd DA took over the sector from 12th DA between 23 and 25 February, while 33rd Division's infantry relieved 12th Division. As the units he had raised began to move into the line, Lt-Col Hall handed over command of CLVI Bde to a permanent officer and returned to Parliament; he was later knighted (KBE) and awarded a Distinguished Service Order (DSO) for his efforts.

The line held by the division was on the La Bassée front from 'Mad Point' to Givenchy, just north of the Hohenzollern Redoubt, scene of bitter fighting the previous autumn, but now considered a 'quiet' sector suitable for newly arrived formations. (Note: On arrival in France, all but two of the division's original Pals battalions had been exchanged with other formations and replaced by experienced units of varied backgrounds.) But there was active Tunnel warfare in this sector, leading to further actions at the Hohenzollern Redoubt. The divisional artillery had to be prepared to put down an 'SOS barrage' at any time when a mine was exploded followed by an infantry raid. On 27 April a German mine was fired and 33rd Division was attacked with heavy gas shelling. Following this attack the batteries were subjected to several days of CB fire. On 22 June a German mine near Givenchy required every available gun to fire SOS missions. On 27 June a British trench raid at Mad Point was covered by a Box barrage fired by the divisional artillery. Further raids were carried out on 2 and 5 July as diversions from the Somme Offensive further south.

=== Reorganisation ===
On 14 February, B (H) Battery and a subsection of the BAC were transferred from CLXVII (H) Brigade to 1/IV London (H) Brigade in the 56th (1st London) Division (TF). Then in May the field artillery of the BEF was reorganised so that howitzer batteries were distributed among the brigades of 18-pounders. All three remaining batteries of CLXVII (H) Brigade were therefore sent to the other brigades of the division, to be designated D (H) Battery in each case. In exchange, CLXVII received an 18-pounder battery from each of the other brigades, The three former D batteries became A/ B/ and C/CLXVII Batteries. The BACs were also abolished and merged into the DAC, which was reorganised as a headquarters and four sections.

In January, the division's infantry brigades had formed light trench mortar batteries (TMBs). Now a brigade of medium and heavy trench mortars was formed by the divisional artillery (although in most divisions around half the men came from the infantry): X/33, Y/33 and Z/33 Medium TMBs (each equipped with four 2-inch Medium Mortars) by 4 May, and V/33 Heavy TMB (9.45-inch Heavy Mortars) by 29 May.

=== Battle of the Somme ===
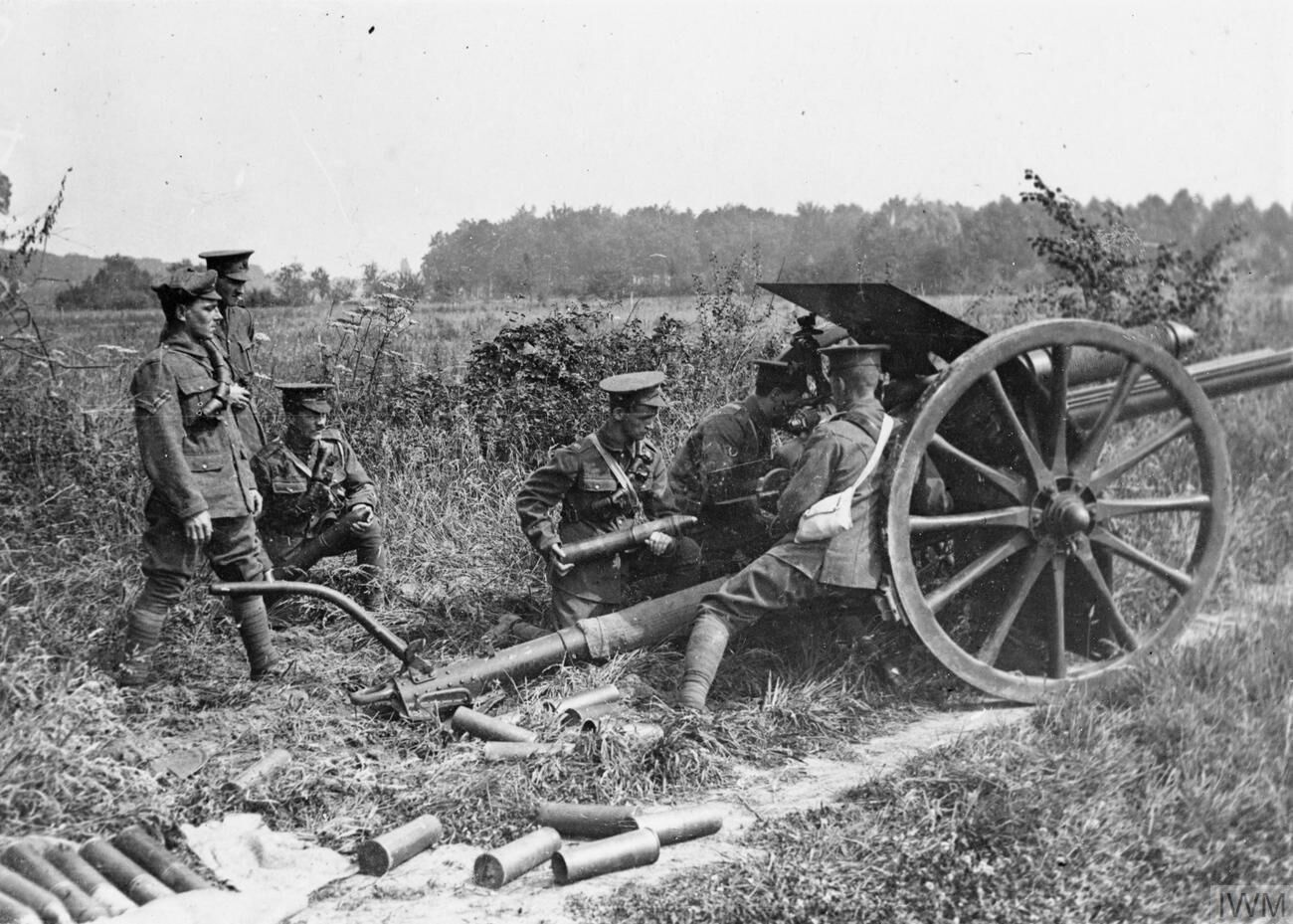
18-Pounder in action on the Somme, August 1916.

After five months of familiarisation with trench warfare on the Western Front, the 33rd Division saw its first fullscale operations during the Somme Offensive as part of XV Corps. It began to move south by train on 10 July and was in Corps Reserve during the Battle of Albert (12–13 July) before being committed to action during the Battle of Bazentin Ridge on 14 July. CLXII and CXLVI Brigades deployed in Caterpillar Valley largely without incident, though D (H)/CLXII Battery deployed in the wrong position and its guns and teams came under heavy shellfire, losing a number of casualties. The infantry of XV Corps took most of their objectives on 14 July, but High Wood and Delville Wood remained in enemy hands. 33rd Division renewed the attack the following day, supported by its own two brigades bombarding Switch Trench west of High Wood for an hour before moving the barrage on to Martinpuich while the infantry assaulted Switch Trench. But Switch Trench was almost completely hidden from the artillery's Forward Observation Officers (FOOs) and the attack was a failure, the infantry returning to their starting positions.

The gunners now dug in and camouflaged the positions they had taken up the previous day. They were joined by the other two brigades during the night of 15/16 July, and some batteries moved to less exposed positions. For five days 33rd DA was able to set up observation posts (OPs) and register targets before the next Attacks on High Wood planned for 20 July. 33rd Divisional Artillery suffered badly from German CB fire on 19 July, sustaining numerous casualties from gas and Shrapnel shells. XV Corps began its bombardment of High Wood at 02.55 on 20 July, with 2000 rounds of 18-pounder and 500 rounds of 4.5-inch ammunition fired by each brigade. The infantry went 'over the top' at Zero (03.25) when the guns lifted to a new barrage line for a further half hour, before lifting to the final barrage line at the far side of the wood. Although the wood was carried and a German counter-attack was broken up by artillery and rifle fire, the hostile artillery fire eventually drove the British infantry back to the southern half of the wood. For two days the artillery duel continued, 33rd DA suffering numerous casualties in men and guns. Although the infantry of 33rd Division were relieved on 21 July the artillery remained in the line under the command of 51st (Highland) Division which renewed the assault on 23 July. This was another failure. Despite a lull in the infantry fighting from 23 to 27 July, the artillery continued to fire under XV Corps' command at the rate of 2000 rounds per brigade by day and 700 by night. The guns' recoil springs began to fail, so that by 26 July CLXII Bde only had five guns in action, two of them only partially serviceable.

On 27 July, 33rd DA supported a new attack by 5th Division between High Wood and Delville Wood, important because it was an early example of a Creeping barrage. A storm of artillery fire heralded the new attack, and fighting continued all day, climaxing at 18.00 when a heavy counter-attack came in, which was broken up by the British artillery, as was another the following night. Casualties among 33rd DA's batteries were, however, heavy, with several guns completely destroyed and a number of gun detachments wiped out. 33rd Divisional Artillery supported attacks by several formations during the Delville Wood fighting until 1 August, when CLXII and CLXVI Bdes were relieved by 17th (Northern) Divisional Artillery. Unfortunately, the relief was carried out under German air observation and the gun teams were heavily shelled. CLVI and CLXVII Bdes remained in the line under the command of 51st (H) Division until they were withdrawn, exhausted, on 11 August, and relieved by CLXII and CLXVI Bdes returning. These two brigades now took up positions around Caterpillar Valley, supporting 33rd Division, whose infantry had also returned. Although there was a lull in the infantry fighting, the artillery duels continued with CB shoots, minor bombardments, and hundreds of shells were fired by day and night to 'search' the enemy's roads and dead ground. Wireless sets were now available, and the howitzers were available to respond to urgent calls from artillery observation aircraft.

Orders arrived on 16 August for the next divisional attack to be delivered on 'Wood Lane' trench two days later. The artillery ammunition allotted for night firing was doubled, while by day the guns engaged in wire-cutting, shelling Wood Lane, and 'searching' No man's land to drive German machine-gunners out of the shell holes. On the morning of 18 August the 18-pounders laid a barrage on Wood Lane, and three times lifted to suggest an impending attack; the 4.5s then dropped back onto the trench in an effort to catch any enemy troops who had manned the parapet. 33rd Division launched its attack at 14.45, but 4th Battalion King's (Liverpool Regiment) on the left, despite following the barrage so closely as to have 'walked right into [it]', were stopped by German machine gun teams who had succeeded in maintaining themselves in No man's land, and it never reached Wood Lane. This failure exposed the right flank of the 14th (Light) Division and the left flank of 1/4th Suffolk Regiment of the 33rd, and the assault failed. The guns then shortened their range to lay down a protective barrage.

33rd Division then went to rest, but 33rd DA remained in the line, side-slipping 200 yards (180 m) to the right, which entailed re-registering the targets in their zone. The horse teams worked day and night to replenish the ammunition from 'Green Dump', coming up the 'Valley of Death' under continuous gas and shell attacks. On 22 August Lt-Col Harris commanding CLXII Bde was ordered to reconnoitre a position for a forward gun to enfilade the new German trench running north-east from Wood Lane, and Lt V. Benett-Sandford with a gun of C Bty registered on the trench at a range of 1,600 yards (1,500 m). After rest, the division returned on 24 August for a more successful attack on High Wood. The divisional artillery was incorporated into a corps fireplan, with CLVI Bde supporting 7th Division, while CLXII and CLXVI supported 14th (L) Division. The bombardment began at 03.45, CLXII Bde sweeping the previously registered Wood Lane in enfilade from 05.45. Zero was at 06.45, when the 18-pdrs began a creeping barrage and the 4.5s lengthened range to bombard the Flers-Longueval road. From his OP near Longueval, Lt-Col Harris was able to send situation reports back to 33rd Divisional HQ, allowing the commander to deal quickly with situations as they arose. The attack was very successful for the division, with 100th Bde finally capturing Wood Trench.

German retaliation came on 25 August, when every battery position was bombarded throughout the day with shells of all calibres. This disrupted ammunition resupply, and some detachments had to be withdrawn from the guns due to heavy casualties. The 18-pdr battery positions of CLXII Bde, 'churned from end to end, were rendered quite uninhabitable, and during that night and the following day new positions were taken up'. CLVI Brigade also moved, but for tactical reasons, so that it could bombard Ginchy. The other brigades' target zones were also moved onto Delville Wood. The ammunition waggons struggled to resupply the guns in the mud. The weather was so bad that the attack on Ginchy was cancelled, which allowed the batteries to drain their positions and dig in properly. 33rd Divisional Artillery remained in position even after the division's infantry were relieved, and supported 24th Division against fierce German counter-attacks on 30 and 31 August. The bombardment for the next attack was due to begin on 2 September, but on the night of 31 August/1 September the positions of CLVI and CLXVII brigades were drenched with gas shells; B/CLXVII Bty suffered so many casualties that it had to be replaced by C Bty from divisional reserve. The bombardment on 2 and 3 September was followed by 1st and 24th Divisions' attack at noon on 3 September, when every gun and howitzer was in action. Delvill Wood was cleared, but there was a reverse in High Wood followed by a German counter-attack, Immediately, nine guns of CLXII Bde were switched to break up this attack, but the Germans halted along the skyline and did not cross it. No other guns were brought to bear on them, and they held the ground they had retaken. 33rd Divisional Artillery was relieved on 5 September after 8 weeks' continuous action and moved to the Arras sector.

=== Further reorganisations ===
Another reorganisation of the BEF's divisional artillery was carried out in September 1916, when the 18-pounder batteries were brought up to a strength of six guns each. In 33rd Division this was done by breaking up CLXVII Bde and transferring a section (half battery) to each of the batteries of CLIV and CLXII, while C/CLXVI was split up between A/ and B/CLXVI (Lt-Col C.G. Stewart of CLXVII Bde took command of CLXVI). The process was completed in January 1917 when CLXVI Bde was broken up, sections of D (H) bringing the other brigades' howitzer batteries up to six guns. A/ and B/CLXVI Batteries were transferred to XXVI and XCIII Army Field Artillery Brigades respectively. CLXVI's brigade HQ exchanged with CLVI, whose staff left, so that Lt-Col Stewart now commanded CLVI. The resulting organisation was as follows:

33rd Divisional Artillery

- CLVI (Camberwell) Brigade (A, B, C and D (H) Btys)
- CLXII (Camberwell) Brigade (A, B, C and D (H) Btys)
- 33rd Divisional Ammunition Column
- 33rd Divisional Trench Mortar Brigade
  - V/33 Heavy Trench Mortar Bty
  - X/33, Y/33 and Z/33 Medium Trench Mortar Btys

=== Battle of the Ancre ===
While 33rd Division remained at rest, its artillery returned to the Somme. The staff work at corps level was poor, and 33rd DA spent the last weeks of September marching and counter-marching from one position to another. Finally the batteries were in position under command of 49th (West Riding) Division to prepare for the final stage of the Somme Offensive, the Battle of the Ancre. From 7 to 11 October the guns were engaged in wire-cutting, then 33rd DA sideslipped to cut wire in front of 31st Division. This continued from 20 October to 13 November (the attack being postponed several times because of mud), with occasional bursts of fire to stop the wire being repaired, and bombardments of enemy communication trenches. These obvious preparations drew heavy CB fire from the Germans, with thousands of gas shells arriving nightly on the battery positions, forcing the gunners to wear respirators while serving their guns. The intensity of the bombardment was increased from 10 November to Zero hour (05.45) on 13 November. Although 31st Division's infantry found the wire successfully cut and advanced through to their second objective behind regular list of the field gun barrage, mud prevented the neighbouring division from crossing no man's land leaving 31st with an open flank. The Hull Pals of 92nd Bde actually got so far forward that they came under fire from their own guns. The captured ground had to be abandoned that evening and 31st Division withdrew in the evening covered by a protective barrage from 33rd DA. The offensive continued further south and 33rd DA fired a dummy barrage on 14 November to assist this before withdrawing from the fighting line.

=== Winter 1916–17 ===
33rd Divisional Artillery spent the following weeks overhauling equipment and training, particularly the newly arrived reinforcements. On 5 December the batteries began the move to the extreme right of the British front, where 33rd and 40th Divisions were to take over positions from the French Army and then alternate. Each division would have two artillery brigades in the line and one in reserve. Almost all the batteries were in position in the Maurepas–Bouchavesnes area by 16 December, where they converted the French gun pits and communications; in practice the batteries reverted to four-gun establishments to take over four-gun positions until new platforms could be erected in the mud. They were pulled out of these positions for rest in mid-January 1917, then returned at the end of the month to take over yet another section from the French, this time straddling the River Somme with a 2,500 yards (2,300 m) gap filled with marshes between the two groups. Battery positions were difficult to find, because the whole sector was under German observation. When the marsh froze over and German raids were feared, the ice was broken by howitzer fire. Harassing fire by German Minenwerfers were replied to by X, Y and Z/33 medium TMBs. Enfilade sections were established to take advantage of bends in the river. More active operations recommenced in February, with wire-cutting and trench bombardments to simulate attacks, and covering fire for actual trench raids. On 9 March, 33rd DA was relieved and moved north in bad weather to the train for the Arras Offensive.

On 21 March 1917, Lt-Col C.G. Stewart, who had commanded three successive brigades of 33rd DA, was promoted to Brigadier-General as Commander, Royal Artillery (CRA) of the division.

=== Battle of Arras ===
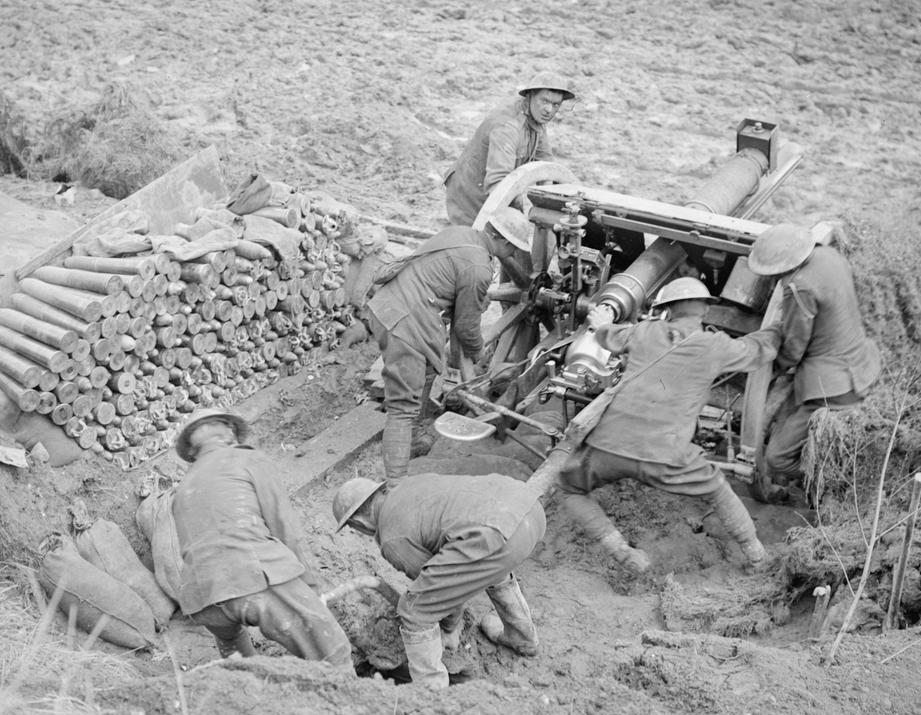
Re-positioning an 18-pounder during the advance near Athies during the First Battle of the Scarpe.

For the forthcoming attack, 33rd DA was responsible for the zone immediately south of the River Scarpe, and after taking part in the preliminary bombardment was to advance in support of the assaulting infantry of 15th (Scottish) Division. OPs were established in some tall factory chimneys on the east side of Arras (with telephone lines running through the town's sewers for protection from shellfire) and the first guns came into action on 30/31 March to begin wire-cutting. The planned five-day bombardment began on 4 April (it was actually extended to six days when the attack was postponed to 9 April) with the biggest and most complex fireplan yet seen. One day was devoted to destroying positions in woods, another to trench junctions, and a third to villages and cross-roads, while the enemy front and support trenches and wire were kept under constant bombardment day and night. Retaliatory fire from the Germans was light, but did cause some casualties on the gun positions. Meanwhile, the routes forward were marked with coloured flags and the waggon lines were brought up for the advance behind the infantry. The 18-pdrs and 4.5s were supplied with 300 rounds per gun per day, the 2-inch mortars with 120 and the 9.45s with 50, the mortars assisting with short-range wire-cutting. 8 April, the original day planned for the attack, gave perfect visibility, allowing the FOOs to spot and concentrate on untouched wire. During the night of 8/9 April the batteries shelled the enemy gun positions with gas, then at 05.30 on 9 April the guns began firing the protective barrage as the infantry advanced. The 18-pdrs fired a creeping barrage (50 per cent Shrapnel, 50 per cent HE), while the 4.5s fired a standing barrage on the enemy front line. The German forward positions (the Black Line) were quickly overrun, the infantry pausing to reorganise behind the barrage, then advancing again at 07.30 towards the more strongly-held Blue Line beyond Railway Triangle through Athies and along Observatory Ridge. The infantry were accompanied by FOOs from their supporting batteries. Railway Triangle proved a serious obstacle, and the creeping barrage outpaced the infantry, but the FOOs saw this and the barrage was brought back to fall on the railway embankment, eliminating the defenders. Meanwhile, two companies of 12th Battalion, Highland Light Infantry, had continued on towards the Blue Line, but realising that they were now ahead of the resumed barrage, coolly took cover and let it pass over them, then followed close behind it. As soon as the Blue Line was secured 33rd DA's batteries began to move up, one section at a time, to prepared positions at Blangy, just behind the British start line, from which they continued the barrage to the third objective (Orange Hill on the Brown Line). All the guns had to pass through narrow streets and cross a single bridge to get to these positions, and it had been feared that German shellfire would have prevented the move, but little was received. By mid-afternoon CCLXII Bde was moving forward again, this time to Railway Triangle. But now it began to snow, and the churned-up battlefield turned to mud as the gun teams struggled forward, the crews manhandling the guns across unbridged trenches. However, they were in position before dawn on 10 April.

There was little fighting on 10 April, while the infantry reorganised and the artillery struggle out of the bog east of Railway Triangle back to the outskirts of Arras, then moved up towards Monchy-le-Preux along the Cambrai road, despite fearful congestion. Next day 33rd DA supported 37th Division's successful attack on Monchy, but the attacks on 12 April failed in the face of increased German artillery. 33rd DA's batteries and waggon lines came under heavy fire and the horse teams had to be withdrawn, leaving only a few at Railway Triangle for pack duties. On 14 April a German counter-attack on Monchy was broken up by the field batteries. 33rd DA then continued harassing fire under 17th (N) Division until 23 April. 17th Division attacked on 23 and 24 April, then 12th (E) Division on 28 April, before the next great effort of the Arras offensive (the Second Battle of the Scarpe) on 4 May. During this attack the howitzer batteries were called upon to bombard the stubbornly-held Scabbard Trench while the British infantry were lying only yards away. The accurate HE did great execution and when the enemy troops broke cover they were caught by the 18-pdrs. After another lull, 4th Division captured the Roeux chemical works on 11–12 April, and 12th Division attempted to take Devil's Tench, both advances being supported by 33rd DA. On 14 May 33rd DA fired a 'Chinese' (dummy) barrage towards Devil's Trench and then bombarded it heavily to catch any defenders who showed themselves. But while the British infantry were reorganising, the German's concentrated on the artillery and the batteries' casualties rose steadily under CB fire directed by air observers. On 16 May the chemical works was lost and a new attack on Devil's Trench was launched on 19 May. The night before, D (H)/CLXII Bty ran a single gun up to Chinstrap Lane in the hope that its enfilade fire would assist the attack, but the infantry were defeated by machine gun fire. Minor attacks and Chinese barrages continued until 14 June, when 3rd Division captured Infantry Hill behind a barrage fired by 33rd DA, and two German counter-attacks on 17 June were smashed by the field guns. On 20 June 33rd DA was finally withdrawn from the Arras sector after three months' action. Because CLXII brigade had always been the furthest forward, the Commander-in-Chief, Sir Douglas Haig awarded it the unusual distinction of presenting a captured 5.9-inch German howitzer. Between April and June it had supported nine separate divisions. 33rd Division had joined in the Second Battle of the Scarpe, and suffered severely due to mistakes by its unfamiliar supporting artillery. From 12 May the CRA, Brig-Gen Stewart controlled the artillery supporting 33rd Division while his brigades were under the CRAs of the divisions to which they were attached.

=== Flanders coast ===
The batteries moved south and took up positions at Hénin-sur-Cojeul facing the Hindenburg Line. For the first time since February, 33rd DA was supporting troops of its own division. In early July, however, the division was transferred to the Flanders coast, the withdrawal of the guns on the night of 11/12 July being accompanied by German shellfire. Training was carried out behind the lines until the batteries entrained on 24 July and took up positions in the sand dunes near Dunkirk, on the extreme left of the whole Western Front. Here Fourth Army was intended to make an amphibious assault behind the enemy lines and advance up the coast in conjunction with the BEF's Flanders offensive (the Third Battle of Ypres). In the meantime the massed artillery duelled with the German guns, suffering casualties through the summer. By the end of August it was clear that the BEF was not going to achieve a clean breakthrough, and the units on the coast began to be sent to the Ypres Salient to reinforce the offensive there. 33rd Divisional Artillery pulled back to its waggon lines on the night of 27/28 August and spent two days there, suffering serious casualties to the DAC from long-range guns, before marching south on 1 September to join Second Army.

=== Third Battle of Ypres ===
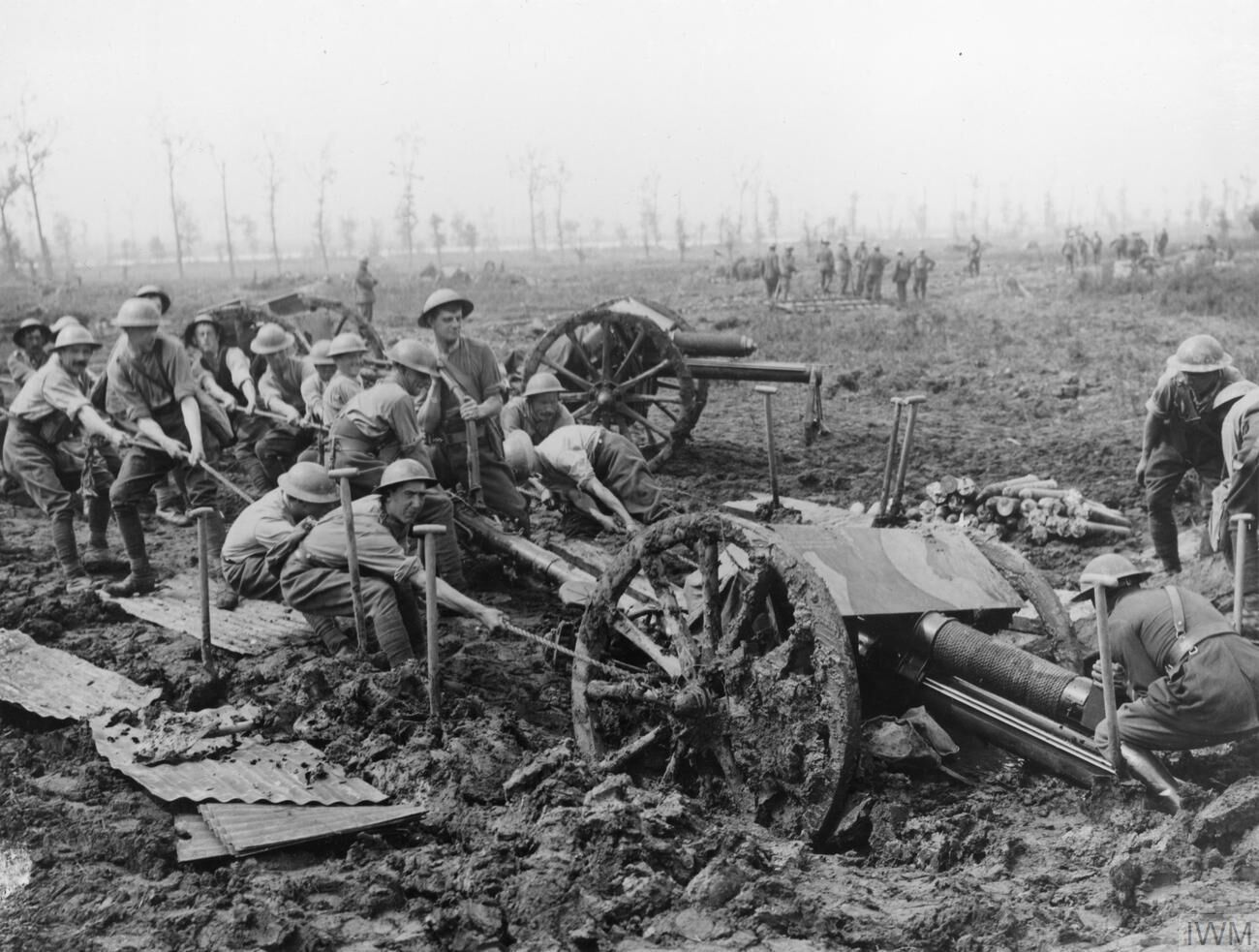
18-pounder being hauled out of mud at Zillebeke, 1917.

The first sections of CLVI Bde relieved CCLXXXVIII Army Field Bde on the night of 5/6 September, the remainder moving in over the next two nights. CLXII Brigade was not relieving another unit, but had to prepare its own gun positions in the mud under shellfire. The working parties were reinforced by men from the DAC and TMBs; Lt-Col Arthur Johnson, commanding the DAC, was killed at Zillebeke on 17 September. The brigades were supporting 23rd and 24th Divisions near Zillebeke, and on 15 September the bombardment began for the Battle of the Menin Road Ridge on 20 September. The terrain was featureless, but most batteries of 33rd DA were able to register their guns on the ruins of Gheluvelt Mill. Because of the mud, it was realised that the infantry could only advance slowly, so the creeping barrage was adjusted accordingly, with practice barrages fired twice a day before the attack. The battle was a notable artillery victory, the creeping barrage described as 'magnificent both in accuracy and volume',. However, casualties among the gunners from German CB fire were heavy, particularly in the minutes before Zero hour, and the guns had to be served at high intensity all day because of the slowness of the advance. 23rd Division took all three of its objective lines, the creeping barrage helping the men onto the third, where the heaviest resistance was encountered. Afterwards the guns fired a protective barrage while the infantry consolidated, and SOS barrages to break up German counter-attacks. By the end of the day every battery had suffered guns put out of action by enemy fire and ammunition dumps exploded, and the next two days were spent hauling up replacement guns from the Corps pool, and replenishing ammunition by means of pack horses.

The new style of attack pioneered by Second Army on the Menin Road was to be repeated at intervals of six days. 33rd Division's infantry relieved 23rd Division on the night of 24/25 September, and Brig-Gen Stewart took command of the artillery in the sector. The next attack, the Battle of Polygon Wood was due on 26 September, but early on 25 September, while the relief was being completed, a surprise counter-attack was launched by the Germans, driving 98th Bde and part of 100th Bde back to their support line, despite the SOS barrage being fired. A second attack mid-morning was stopped by the SOS barrage, but when the British artillery fired a practice barrage the Germans responded with devastating CB fire. A further artillery duel accompanied an SOS barrage late in the afternoon. These exchanges set back preparations for the next day's attack, which was held up on 33rd Division's front. The lost trench was recaptured, followed by the first objective, but the infantry could not get beyond it and at 12.15 the batteries were ordered to fire a protective barrage. A severe German shell storm and counter-attack came in mid-afternoon. It was not until the next day that 33rd Division worked its way forward to the final objective. By now the gun detachments were exhausted and weakened by casualties. A/CLVI Battery lost 13 guns in four days and 21 men, including nine gun No 1s, and the other batteries suffered similarly. B/CLXII Battery had to be relieved on 27 September, and the other batteries were only kept in action by men brought up from the DAC and the TM batteries; most guns had only one qualified gun-layer remaining.

On 28 September 33rd Division and the CRA were withdrawn, but the two brigades of 33rd DA remained in the line under the command of 23rd Division – a practice barrage coinciding with and breaking a German counter-attack. The brigades supported 5th Division for the next phase of the offensive, the Battle of Broodseinde on 4 October. The objectives were strictly limited, but as before the guns 'shot' the infantry forward, and the German infantry and artillery were severely handled. The creeping barrage had advanced to the extreme range of the 18-pdrs to catch more Germans before dropping back to provide a protective barrage for the consolidating British infantry, breaking up eight counter-attacks in the afternoon and evening.

Conditions for the artillery in the Ypres Salient were now very bad: British batteries were clearly observable from the Passchendaele Ridge and suffered badly from counter-battery fire, while their own guns sank into the mud and became difficult to aim and fire. Nevertheless, B/CLXII Bty came up again and the gun detachments did their best to reconstruct their gun positions, haul up ammunition and register for the next attack (the Battle of Poelcappelle) on 9 October, when 5th Division attempted to clear the Polderhoek Spur. But many of the shells were misdirected because of unstable gun platforms, while many landing in mud were ineffective. The infantry lost direction in the sea of shell holes, lost the barrage, and achieved nothing at the cost of heavy casualties.

Over the following days 33rd DA's batteries were rotated between the gun lines and the waggon lines, where they could get some rest, and by 24 October all were back in the line except C/CLXII, which had been worst hit. For the attack of 26 October (the Second Battle of Passchendaele), CLXII Bde HQ took command of 'C' Group at Bedford House supporting 20th Bde of 7th Division; the group included A and D (H)/CLXII, B and C/CLVI, and three Australian batteries. D (H)/CLXII Battery was shelled out of its position at Maple Cross and relocated to Zouave Wood. The other batteries of 33rd DA were in 'B' Group supporting 91st Bde of 7th Division. The bad weather continued and the mud worsened, but at 05.40 the barrage started, dropping 150 yards (140 m) in front of the infantry as they formed up. It then began creeping forward at a slow pace of 7 yards (6.4 m) per minute, pausing as a protective barrage at each objective. But even at this slow pace the infantry could not keep up through the mud and were shit down by the unsuppressed machine guns. By 08.20 91st Bde could advance no further and was forced back to its start line. 20th Brigade reached Gheluvelt, but was stopped by the enemy pillboxes and the ground had to be given up at the end of the day. This failure was the last infantry action supported by 33rd DA in 1917. The batteries began to withdraw, under gas shelling, over the next few days. It had been in action for 51 days continuously. Although the batteries only kept the minimum number of men in the gun line (six men per gun), CLXII Bde had lost 315 men in the period, and CLVI almost as many. A/CLVI Battery had 26 guns disabled, and D (H)/CLXII had lost 19 guns and 106 officers and men.

=== Winter 1917–18 ===
33rd Divisional Artillery was given a full month in a rest area near Boulogne to absorb raw reinforcements and reorganise gun detachments around the few remaining experienced gunners. On 22 November Brig-Gen Stewart and 33rd DA staff returned to Ypres to command the batteries then supporting 33rd Division in the line at Passchendaele, with his own batteries to follow later. However, the batteries were suddenly ordered up late on 1 December and they had to rush up a long distance, with the gunners taken by motor lorry. They then relieved the army field batteries in position by sections, completing the relief by the end of 4 December. The guns along this section of front were organised into two groups: Lt-Col Bernard Butler of CLVI Bde commanded No 1 Group, which included the whole of 33rd DA, while Lt-Col E.J. Skinner of CLXII Bde commanded the waggon lines; CLXXXVI (Deptford) Bde of 39th DA formed No 2 Group. Infantry operations were at a standstill, but the artillery was active throughout the winter, under fire from German artillery and unable to prepare dugouts in the sodden ground. Firing was reduced to a minimum while the gun detachments struggled to keep their equipment serviceable in the mud and the drivers struggled to bring ammunition and supplies up the shell-shattered tracks. After just 17 days in the line, the exhausted brigades began to be rotated to the waggon lines. In January 1918 they went back up to relieve 50th (Northumbrian) Division's gunners in the No 1 and No 2 Group positions. In February the brigades were sent to the rear to calibrate their guns and undergo training with the infantry of their division, before returning to the same positions. During March the Germans increased their CB and gas shelling and began trench raids, while 33rd DA practised 'counter-preparation' barrages to meet enemy attacks.

In February 1918, V/33 and Z/33 TMBs were abolished and the personnel split between X/33 and Y/33, now termed Mobile TMBs, each consisting of six Newton 6-inch Mortars and manned exclusively by the RFA.

=== German Spring Offensive ===
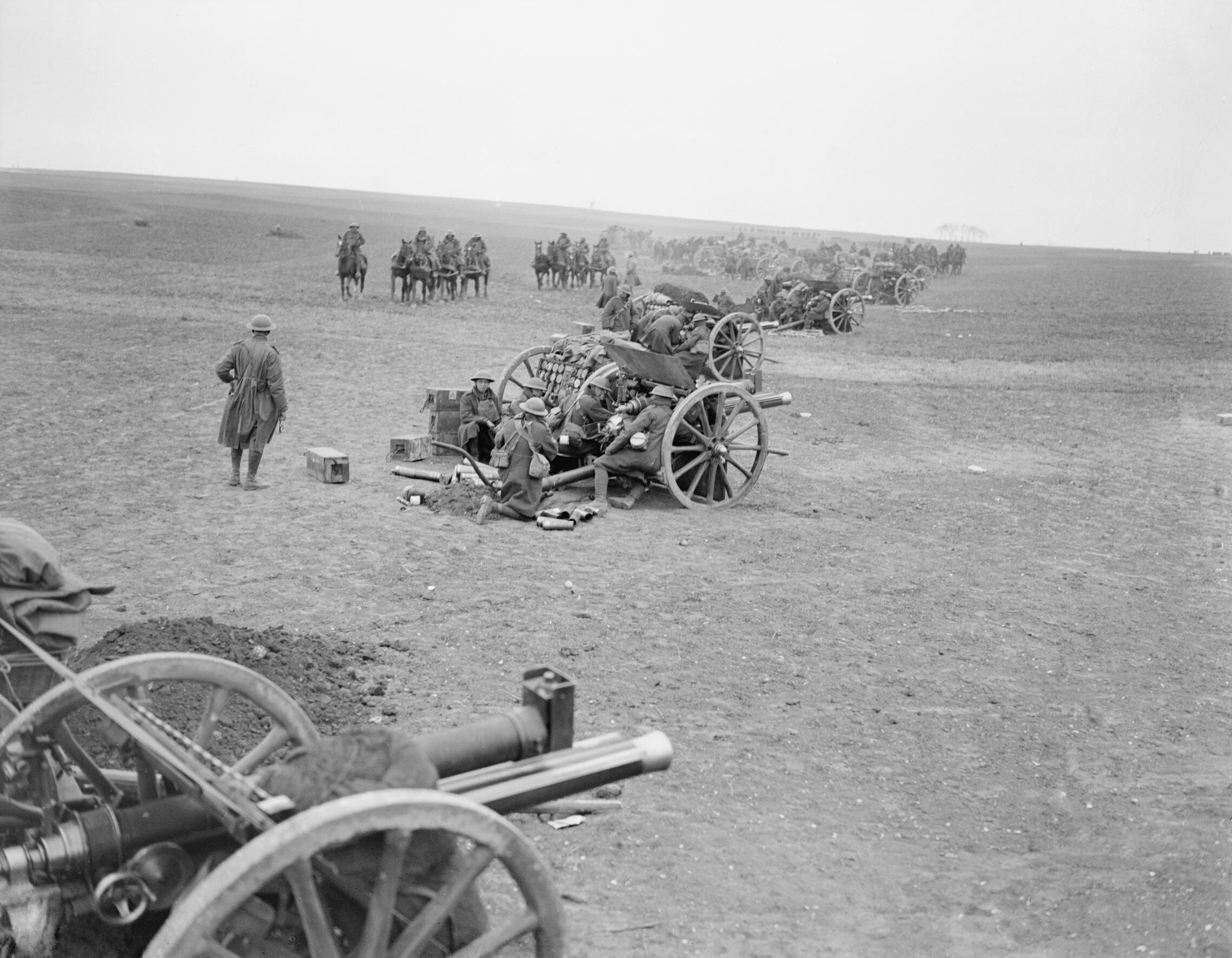
18-pounder battery in action in the open during the Spring Offensive.

The Germans launched their Spring Offensive on 21 March, but Second Army in the Ypres Salient was unaffected. However, the guns began to be distributed in greater depth, with alternative positions prepared, in case the German attack was widened and Second Army found itself pushed back. On 7 and 8 April, 33rd DA was relieved from the front line and went back to Poperinghe and Vlamertinghe for rest. On the afternoon of 10 April they got word that the Germans had launched a new phase of their offensive, the Battle of the Lys and the batteries were ordered up to assist the defence. That night they bivouacked by their guns, with Lewis gun teams posted for all-round defence, before taking up their positions next day. CLVI Brigade was posted between Vierstraat and Kemmel, but CLXII Bde found that the positions they had reconnoitred near Spanbroekmolen were overrun by the enemy before they could take them up, so they went into action in the woods north of Kemmel. Both brigades were supporting 19th (Western) Division, and remained in these positions until 16 April, occasionally breaking up groups of Germans seen in the distance.

16 April dawned with a dense fog, through which the Germans attacked without warning: the FOO of CLVI Bde at Wytschaete only saw them when they were 25 yards (23 m) away. He opened rifle fire against them and tried to get word to the neighbouring batteries, but was fatally wounded. Now fully aroused, the batteries poured in fire and set up new OPs. CLXII Brigade was forced to shorten its range progressively, and then to withdraw by sections as the enemy drew closer. The withdrawal was carried out under heavy shellfire. The guns remained under shellfire next day and CLVI Bde was also forced to withdraw, though CLXII Bde was able to support an attempted British counterattack near Wytschaete. The position remained stable from 17 to 25 April, with 33rd DA under the command of 9th (Scottish) Division until 22 April when a French formation took over the front.

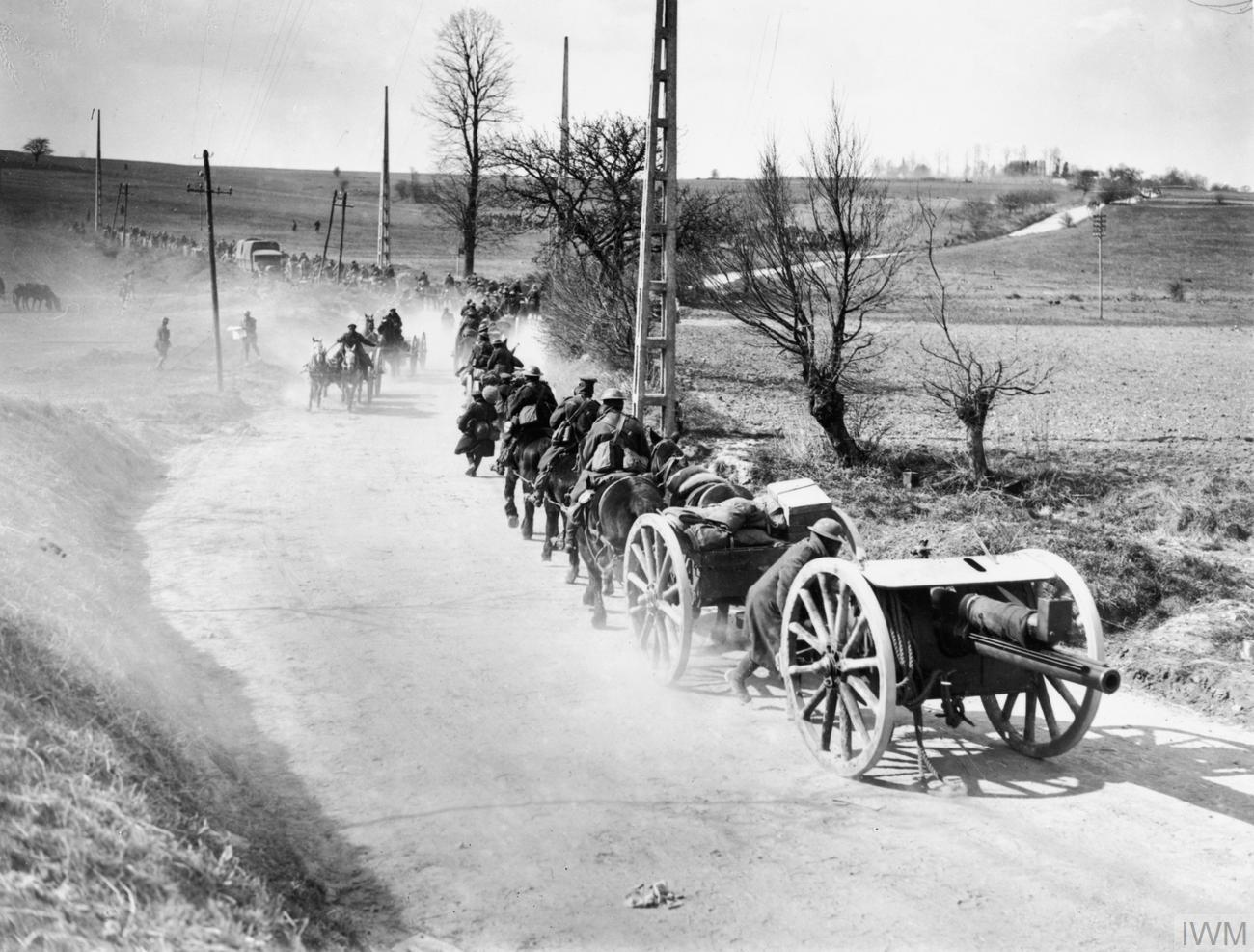
18-pounder battery moving up during the Spring Offensive

During 24 April the gun positions came under CB fire directed by German Observation balloons and at 01.00 on 25 April some of the batteries were warned of an impending attack. The German bombardment beginning an hour later was extremely heavy, mixing gas and high explosive (HE). When the German infantry advanced at 06.15 a thick fog blinded 33rd DA's observers on Mont Kemmel, and the gunners had to fire their counter-preparation barrage blind. 9th Battalion, King's Own Yorkshire Light Infantry, of 21st Division were driven out of their support positions by gas shelling, and took up some disused trenches on Hill 44 just in front of CLVI Bde. Soon afterwards it became clear that there were no French infantry left between the gun lines and the advancing Germans, and there was a gap to the right flank: the only infantry in the line were the 9th KOYLI and a few stragglers collected by Maj Barker of C/CLVI Bty as an escort for his guns. Hill 44 was clearly a German objective, so Lt-Cols Butler and Skinner decided to begin withdrawing their undamaged guns singly, leaving the others in action. In CLVI Bde, A Bty only had one gun able to fire from its main position, and this was soon silenced; the two guns of the advanced section under Lt Blackwell were surrounded and captured. B Battery was almost out of ammunition and its field of fire was blocked by trees, so Maj Studd had the breech blocks and sights removed except for two guns, one of which was towed out by a team from C Bty, and the other was run forward with the help of some KOYLI, and Maj Studd and four gunners engaged the enemy over open sights at a range of 300 yards (270 m). C Battery was in the open: the limbers were brought up from 200 yards (180 m) behind, one at a time, and the first three guns were withdrawn, but one team was bogged and shot down. The last guns were kept in action by a sergeant and six gunners, the only men unwounded. D (H) Battery had its advanced gun knocked out but the rest were successfully withdrawn. By 11.00 the only gun in the forward positions still in action was Maj Studd's, protected by a thin line of the KOYLI; this gun was swung round to fire directly in the rear to drive off attackers. By 13.00 the gun was out of ammunition, so Studd removed the breech block and sight, and set off to find his battery.

Meanwhile, CLXII Bde had been subjected to the same pre-dawn bombardment and all communication between the batteries and brigade HQ were cut, but the guns continued firing all morning. The advanced section of D Bty did still have a telephone wire operating, and reported on the German advance. At 08.00 horse teams were sent up to withdraw these two guns before they were overrun, which was carried out successfully, the gunners walking by their guns and all the wounded carried away, even though the Germans were on both flank and only 300 yards (270 m) away: every driver of both teams was awarded the Military Medal (MM). Once this section had retired, the main line of guns followed, withdrawing by sections to previously reconnoitred positions. Only three guns could not be extricated, two of C Bty and one of A Bty, and even these were recovered at nightfall. By the end of the day the battle had developed into a stalemate at Ridge Wood, and CLXII Bde was still in action, firing in support of the defending infantry; CLVI Bde came back into action next day. The brigades remained under shellfire for the next three days, and on 29 April they fired in support of 49th (WR) Division to repulse the last German attack on the Flanders front.

=== Summer 1918 ===
Shelling continued on both sides through early May, but there were no more major actions. On 6 May Brig-Gen Stewart took over control of all the guns of 9th (Scottish) and 30th Divisions assembled on this front in addition to his own two brigades, and some rest for batteries became possible. On 8 May there was a sharp local action, heralded by heavy German bombardment of the battery positions. Their infantry achieved a partial breakthrough in front of Ridge Wood, but this was driven back by the British guns and an energetic counter-attack by 19th Infantry Bde of 33rd Division, which had just come in to the line.

Some exchanges of fire continued, and Lt-Col Skinner was wounded and evacuated on 10 May, but the batteries could be withdrawn and by 18 May the whole of 33rd DA was assembled in a rest camp as part of II Corps' reserve. It was assigned to support 49th (WR) Division and Belgian forces if required, but was not called upon. In June and July, 33rd DA was back in the line, carrying out some CB shoots and supporting occasional trench raids. On 14 July the right hand battalion of 33rd Division and the left hand of the neighbouring 6th Division attacked under cover of the guns and finally recaptured Ridge Wood. The FOOs went forward with the infantry and brought down defensive fire to break up the German counter-attacks.

Also on 14 July, groups of officers from the US Army's 30th Infantry Division were attached to each field brigade, in preparation for 33rd Division to train 30th US Division in trench warfare. This began on 25 July, though the American division's own artillery was not present, and it would spend the rest of the war supported by British and Australian artillery units. The American infantry units began rotating with those of 33rd Division in the front line, and by 17 August the 30th US Division held the whole sector, supported by 33rd DA. This continued until the end of August, when 33rd DA was relieved and travelled south to join its parent division. It went into billets for a fortnight's rest and training before entering the Allied Hundred Days Offensive, which had been launched on 8 August.

=== Hundred Days' Offensive ===
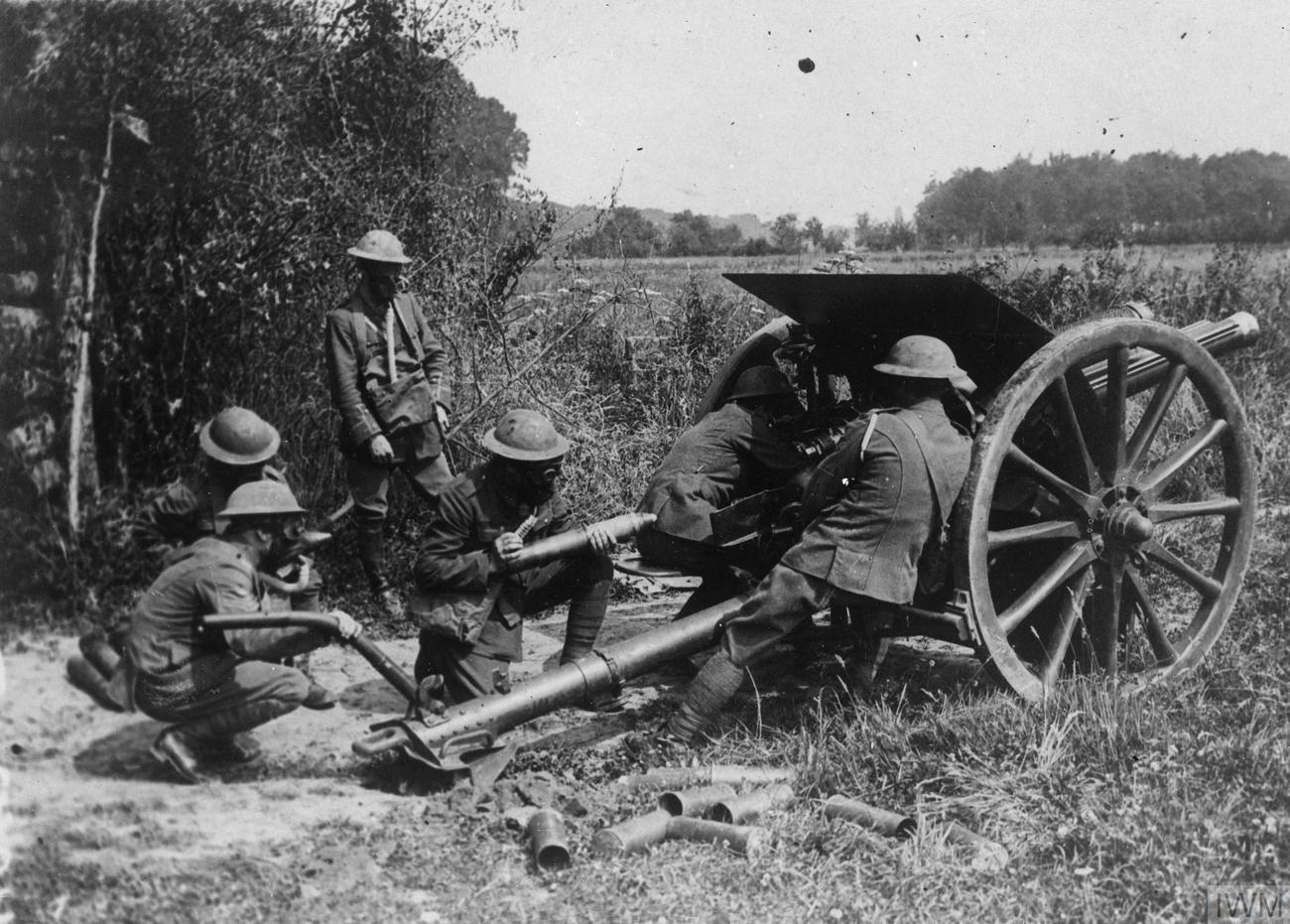
Gunners wearing Small box respirators firing an 18-pounder, August 1918.

33rd Divisional Artillery moved into action north of Heudecourt during the night of 16/17 September having moved secretly up to the line by a series of long night marches. These marches had exhausted the gunners, who only had time for brief registration shoots before the attack went in at 05.20 on 18 September (the Battle of Épehy. The two brigades of 33rd DA supported 17th (N) Division in a fireplan that involve a hurricane bombardment by mortars, a creeping barrage of 18-pdrs and a half-hour smoke barrage by the 4.5s. There was also a searching barrage of 18-pdrs and 4.5s fired 200–500 yards beyond the creeping barrage. 17th (N) Division achieved all its objectives after a hard fight: Gauche Wood proved a tough objective, but the 6-inch mortars were brought up to knock out a machine gun nest hidden amongst derelict British tanks from a previous battle. In the afternoon 33rd DA's guns engaged moving targets, broke up counter-attacks, and laid on a further creeping barrage after dark as the infantry pushed forward to consolidate just short of the Hindenburg Line.

33rd Division then relieved 21st Division, which had attacked on the right, and 33rd DA moved up behind it on 23 September. That night CLXII Bde was subjected to an intense enemy gas bombardment, which put Brigade HQ and B Bty completely out of action; Maj G. Fetherston of A Bty directed the whole brigade despite an earlier wound. The division's task was to capture the Hindenburg outposts covering the St Quentin Canal and there was a great deal of minor fighting. Two guns of B/CLXII were brought back into action, one each to A and C, and these two batteries were also given four captured 77mm guns, which enabled them to fire captured stocks of 'Yellow Cross' (Mustard gas) shells. The Battle of the St Quentin Canal was launched on 29 September; two brigades of 33rd Division attacked Villers-Guislain, supported by three RFA brigades (including both of 33rd DA's) under the command of Brig-Gen G.H.W. Nicholson, the CRA. However, the attack failed and the infantry were back on their starting position by nightfall, having suffered heavy casualties. The batteries had been ordered to move up behind the infantry, and were caught by shellfire, with B/CLVI Bty less than 400 yards (370 m) from the enemy.

Despite the failure at Villers-Guislain, the Battle of the St Quentin Canal was a resounding success, the Hindenburg Line was penetrated, and the enemy in front of Third Army began to withdraw. Over the following days 33rd Division probed forward against rearguards, field artillery sections and mobile mortar sections working with the infantry to shell strongpoints, 38th (Welsh) Divisional Artillery (CXXI and CXXII Bdes) operating under the command of 33rd DA. From this date until the end of the war the two divisions together formed the right of V Corps, the infantry leapfrogging each other as they advanced. The CRA of whichever division was in the lead (Brig-Gens G.W.H. Nicholson (33rd) and T.E. Topping (38th)) commanded both divisional artilleries. On the night of 4/5 October 38th (W) Division took the lead and its engineers and pioneers worked to get 33rd DA, 38th (W) DA, and XXXIV Army Field Artillery Bde across the St Quentin Canal. Next day the enemy line broke: by 16.00 CLVI Bde was across a rough bridge over the canal and an hour later both brigades began to cross. On 7 October the combined divisional artilleries and XIII (Mobile) Bde, RGA, began wire-cutting for an attack by 38th (Welsh) Division against the Beaurevoir Line (the Second Battle of Cambrai). Zero hour was 01.00 on 8 October and four separate creeping barrages were arranged, guns and tanks operating together to 'carry' the infantry into Villers-Outréaux. After the division's successful advance of about 5,000 yards (4,600 m), CXXII and CLVI Brigades moved up west of Malincourt and XIII RGA Bde to Villers-Outréaux.

That night 33rd Division was ordered to pass through 38th (W) Division, and to pursue the enemy towards the River Selle next morning. 19th Infantry Bde took the lead as a brigade group, which included CLVI Bde and both field brigades and the mobile mortar section of 38th (W) DA, as well as XCIV Bde (21st DA), E Squadron, North Irish Horse (V Corps Cyclist Battalion), 11th Field Co, RE, and C Company, 33rd Battalion, Machine Gun Corps. This mobile group set off at 02.00 and reached the outskirts of Malincourt just after a delayed action mine left by the Germans destroyed the road, imposing a delay on the wheeled vehicles. CLVI Brigade was assigned to close support and fired as the infantry crossed their start line at 05.20, then moved ahead with them, operating in two- and three-gun sections. Advancing under open warfare conditions and clearing a succession of villages, the brigade made an advance of seven and a half miles in a few hours on 9 October, but often the batteries were unable to fire because of uncertainty over the relative positions of the British and German troops, as well as difficulty in bringing the ammunition so far forward under enemy shellfire. The infantry were held up by machine guns at Clary, but two guns of A/CLVI and three of B/CLVI, together with some advanced sections of CLXII immediately came into action and engaged the machine guns over open sights. A single gun B/CLVI also engaged some machine guns for the neighbouring 17th (N) Division. The guns then followed the infantry through Clary, and by 10.00 al four brigades were in action beyond the village. Clary was the first place where the troops encountered liberated French civilians in large numbers, and they were given an enthusiastic welcome. During the subsequent pursuit to the River Selle on 10 October CXXII Bde advanced ahead of 98th Infantry Bde, following 7th Cavalry Bde and coming into action on the forward slope down to the river. 33rd DA's batteries also worked their way up onto the high ground commanding the river and engaged the enemy batteries on the opposite slope. Although the cavalry suffered severe casualties from the strong enemy rearguards 98th Bde pushed on and got patrols across the river that night.

The supply problems led to a pause before the Battle of the Selle could be launched. Although 33rd Division obtained bridgeheads across the river on 12 October, there was insufficient ammunition for a regular barrage, the guns merely firing on targets of opportunity. For the next week the guns and mortars of 33rd DA supported 38th (W) Division in preparing for the attack, bombarding enemy positions along the railway embankment, preventing working parties from repairing the wire, and firing gas shells into dead ground likely to shelter enemy troops. V Corps resumed its advance at 02.00 on 20 October, with 38th (W) Division carrying out a deliberate attack across the Selle in heavy rain. There was no preliminary bombardment, and the barrage came down at zero, resting on the initial line (the railway) for 4 minutes, then advancing by lifts of 100 yards (91 m) every four minutes. This was slow enough to allow the infantry to scramble up the slippery embankment in the dark. A 'protector' barrage paused on each of the objectives as the infantry dug in, before moving on as the next wave leap-frogged through. 38th (W) Division took all its objectives and 38th (W) DA closed up to the river, pushing a section of 18-pdrs across that night. On 21 October they were joined by CCXXIII Bde of 63rd (Royal Naval) DA. During the moonlit night of 21/22 October the two 38th (W) DA field brigades went across and formed up immediately beyond the river before dawn, cramped close behind the infantry, while 33rd DA's guns remained deployed on the west side. CLVI Brigade was attached to 113th Infantry Bde and CXXI Bde across the river, while CLXII supported 115th Infantry Bde and CXXII Bde. On 23 October 33rd Division took over the advance, covered by fire from 33rd and 38th (W) DA and CCXXIII Bde, all under Brig-Gen Nicholson, and with two 6-inch mortars moving up with each infantry brigade. For the attack on the second objective, 2nd Bn Argyll and Sutherland Highlanders took the lead accompanied by the 18-pdrs of B/CLVI Bty and a section of 4.5s of D/CLVI Bty. The attack was so successful that the rest of the field guns found themselves left behind and had to move forward across the Selle to keep the enemy in range. Lieutenant-Colonel Butler of CLVI Bde was mortally wounded by a shellburst while riding up from Bde HQ to his batteries. On 24 October 33rd Division attacked towards Le Quesnoy supported by the four brigades of the two divisions firing bursts and then moving forwards, but without a full barrage it failed to take its objective of Englefontaine. The guns kept up fire on all exits from Englefontaine, and at 01.00 on 26 October the division attacked again behind a thick barrage, 10 per cent of which was gas shells. Nicholson had to work out all the details himself because all his staff had been laid low by Spanish flu, but the operation was a complete success.

38th (W) Division moved up behind this advance, reaching Richemont on 26 October, where Topping and his 38th (W) DA staff relieved Nicholson that night. All four field brigades withdrew at dusk for a 72-hour rest (by now both of 33rd DA's field brigades were seriously weakened by the flu outbreak, and CLVI Bde only got 24 hours). They returned to the line on 29 October as V Corps prepared to attack through the Forêt de Mormal towards the River Sambre. 38th (W) Division launched the attack into the forest (Battle of the Sambre) at 05.30 on 4 November. It had some hard fighting at the edge of the wood, being unable to follow the barrage as closely as usual because the gunners were using Shrapnel shells to burst in the treetops, with the danger of some friendly shells bursting above the attackers. The creeping shrapnel barrage was preceded by another with HE and Thermite shells. The leading battalions were supported by sections of 18-pdrs advancing with them. Once the infantry had taken the second objective the artillery moved up, 38th (W) and 33rd DA working forward one battery at a time to maintain the barrage. Bringing the field guns up through the fallen trees along roads deliberately cratered by the enemy was difficult, but they provided a barrage to support the advance onto the final objective, which was gained just before dark. The engineers and pioneers were put to work making the roads through the forest passable for the artillery. 33rd Division, which had been following closely, completed the advance through the forest on 5 November. Although harassing fire was kept up before the attack, the guns were now forbidden to use HE shell for fear of causing casualties to French civilians sheltering in the villages. The advance was made without a barrage, sections of guns moving up with each battalion, but it was effective, the Germans retreating across the Sambre and destroying the bridges. By 10.30 the leading infantry were crossing the river, but the guns could not follow.

By dawn on 7 November a rough bridge constructed at the bottom of a steep path allowed D/CLXII Bty to get the first guns across the Sambre. It was followed by A/CLXII, which came straight into action to break up an enemy counter-attack. The bridge was temporarily blocked by a broken-down transport waggon, but after a delay the whole brigade got across for what was the last fighting day on this part of the front. 38th (W) DA's field brigades acted as an improvised DAC, bringing up and dumping ammunition for 33rd DA until the respective DACs could struggle through the forest. CLVI Brigade had also been left behind, and CLXII Bde fired the division's last shots on 9 November. Blown bridges made further pursuit impossible.

=== Demobilisation ===
33rd Divisional Artillery was concentrated in the Wattignies sector on 11 November 1918 when news arrived of the Armistice with Germany. After the news was read out at a parade, the gunners went off to play a football match against the infantry. The batteries then returned through Northern France to billets in the Hornoy area. Demobilisation began in March 1919 and by the second week of June only an equipment guard remained with each battery. In July the last cadres entrained for Le Havre, where they were progressively shipped back to Southampton, CLVII Bde on 10 July, DAC on 12 and 17, and CLXII Bde on 27 July. A few days later they marched through Camberwell before disvabding.

All surviving units of 33rd DA were disbanded in 1919 except the original A/CLXVI Bty, which in early 1917 had joined XXVI Army Field Brigade as A Bty. In 1919 this was redesignated as 165 (H) Bty and later 141 (H) Bty. It was absorbed into 55 Bty of the Regular Army in 1922.

== Commanders ==
The following officers served as CRA of 33rd Divisional Artillery during the war:

- Brig-Gen W.H. Stuart, 5 July–12 November 1915
- Brig-Gen C.F. Blane, CMG, 12 November 1915 – 21 March 1917
- Brig-Gen C.G. Stewart, CMG, DSO, 21 March 1917– 29 July 1918
- Brig-Gen G.H.W. Nicholson, CMG, from 29 July 1918

== 126th (Camberwell) Heavy Battery, RGA ==
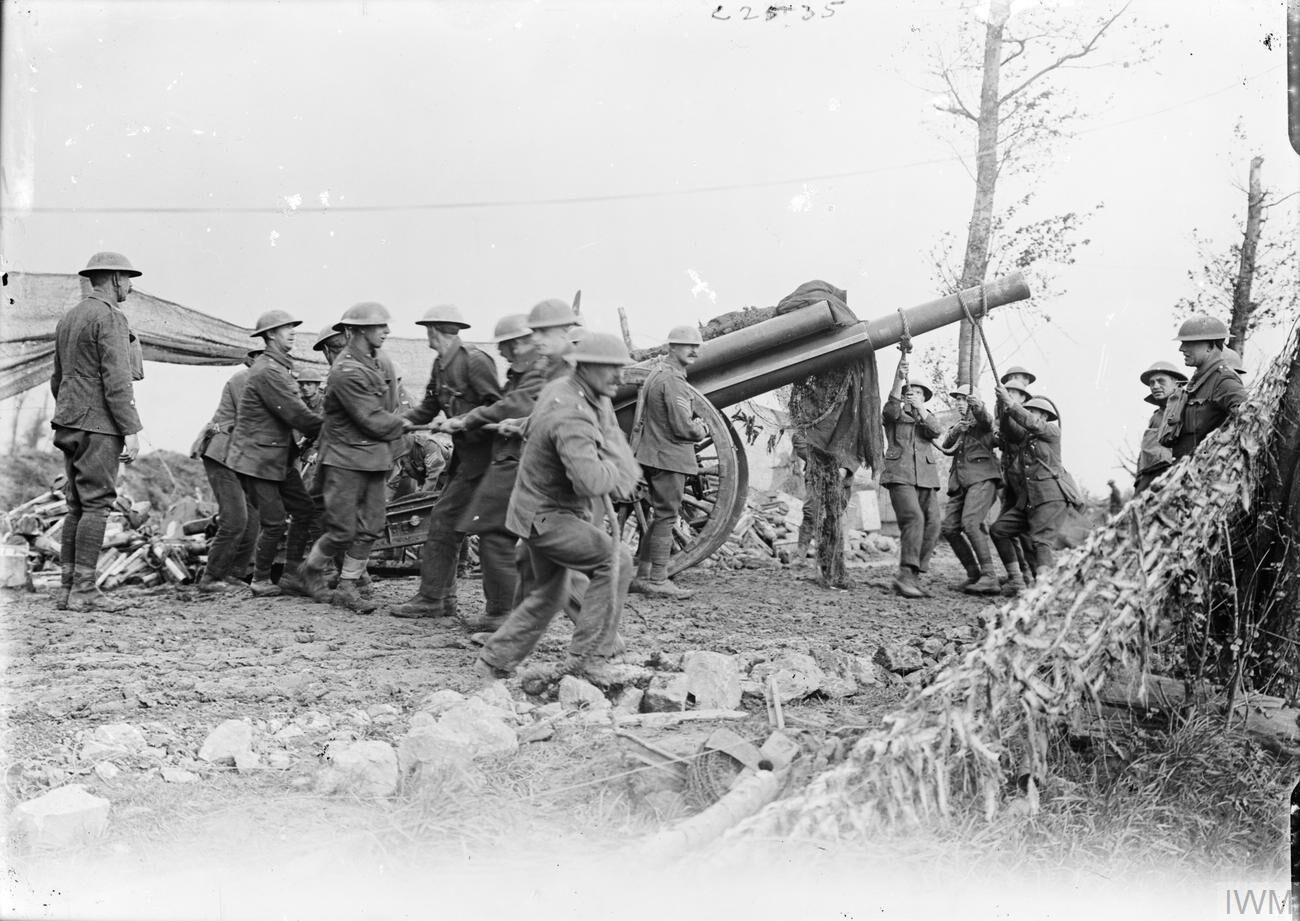
Moving a 60-pounder gun out of its emplacement, 1917.

126th (Camberwell) Heavy Battery and its ammunition column were raised at Camberwll as part of 33rd Divisional Artillery in April 1915. By the time 33rd Division embarked for France, the policy was to remove heavy batteries from infantry divisions and concentrate them into heavy artillery groups (HAGs). 126th Heavy Bty, equipped with four 60-pounder guns, disembarked at Le Havre on 29 April 1916 and joined 22nd HAG with Fourth Army on 2 May in time for the Battle of the Somme.

The battery moved to 44th (South African) HAG on 6 September. Then on 24 November it was made up to six guns with a section from 197th Heavy Bty, which had just arrived from England to join Fourth Army. (Note: 197th Heavy Bty and its ammunition column had been formed at Aldershot, on 21 June 1916; its other section joined 22nd Heavy Bty in 44th HAG.)

On 13 March 1917, 126th Hvy Bty was ordered to 31st HAG with First Army, which it joined on 21 March. Here it formed part of the counter-battery support for I Corps in the Battle of Vimy Ridge. The corps' objective was Bois en Hache, north of the Ridge. There was a 48-hour preliminary bombardment, then when the attack went in at 05.30 on 9 April the most powerful and concentrated bombardment of the war so far crashed onto the German lines. The role of the 'heavies' was to bombard targets in depth and carry out a comprehensive CB fireplan. The attack was a great success.

The composition of HAGs was extremely fluid, and batteries were frequently moved from one to another as operations demanded. 126th Heavy Bty moved to 15th HAG on 11 May, then to 67th HAG on 4 July, 89th HAG on 28 July, and back to 67th HAG on 10 November. It was assigned to 62nd HAG on 5 December and arrived on 22 December when the HAG joined Fourth Army, but from 23 December to 15 January 1918 it was actually attached to 68th HAG.

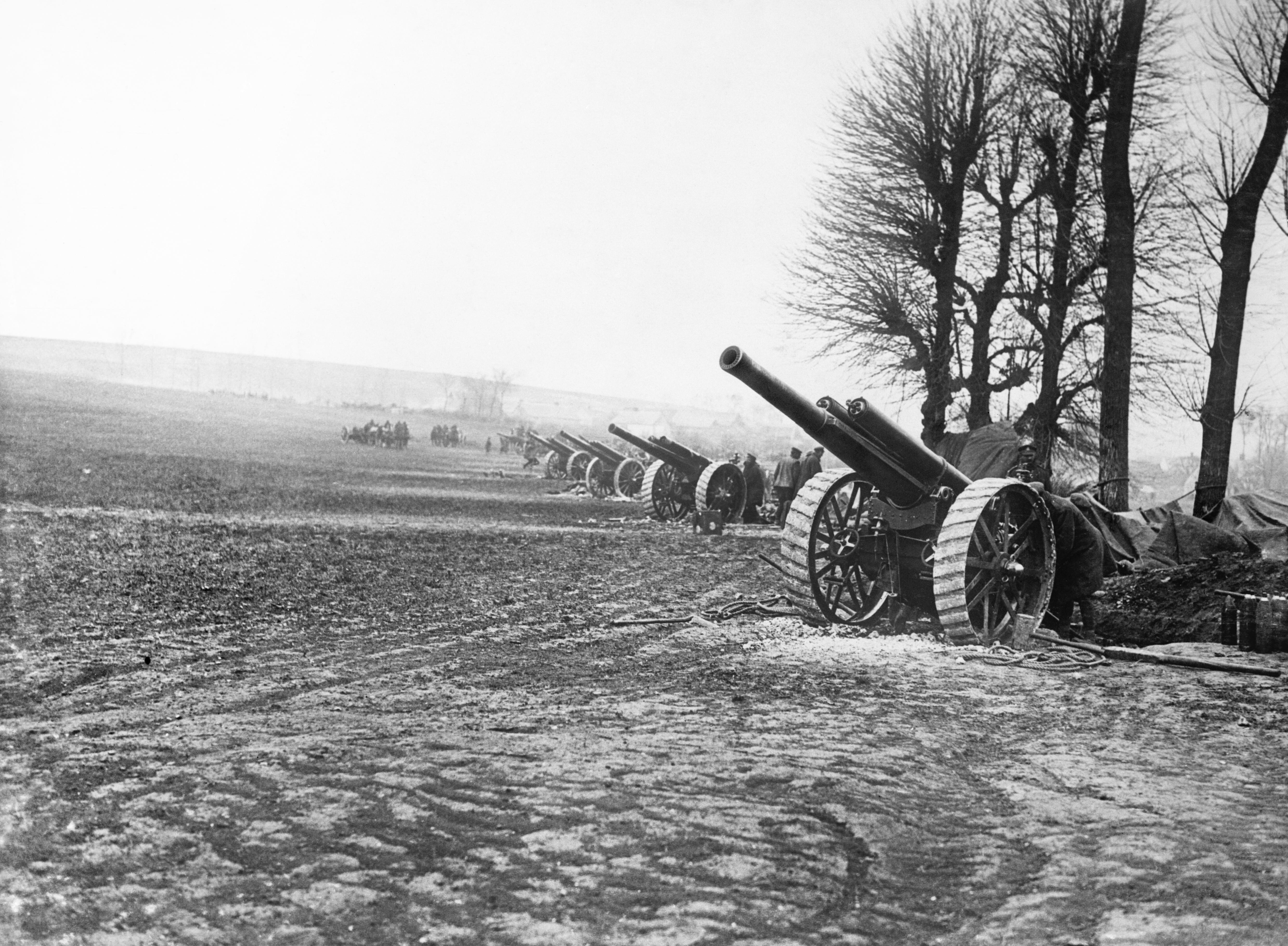
60-pounders deployed in the open during the German Spring Offensive.

On 1 February 1918 the HAGs were redesignated 'Brigades, RGA', and became more permanent organisations. 126th Heavy Bty remained with 62nd Brigade, RGA, until the end of the war. The brigade had a mixture of 60-pounders and various heavy howitzers. 62nd Brigade transferred from Fourth to Third Army on 14 March and was still with it at the time of the Armistice with Germany on 11 November 1918.

A week after 62nd Bde RGA transferred to Third Army the German spring offensive was launched. Part of Third Army was engaged in the desperate fighting, but overall it was not obliged to retreat as far or to abandon as many heavy guns as Fifth Army further south. By the time of the attack on Third Army's front at Arras on 28 March, 'the German artillery was ineffective and, when it opened fire, was shot to pieces by the British heavies'.The German offensive had been halted on Third Army's front by 5 April.

=== Hundred Days' Offensive ===
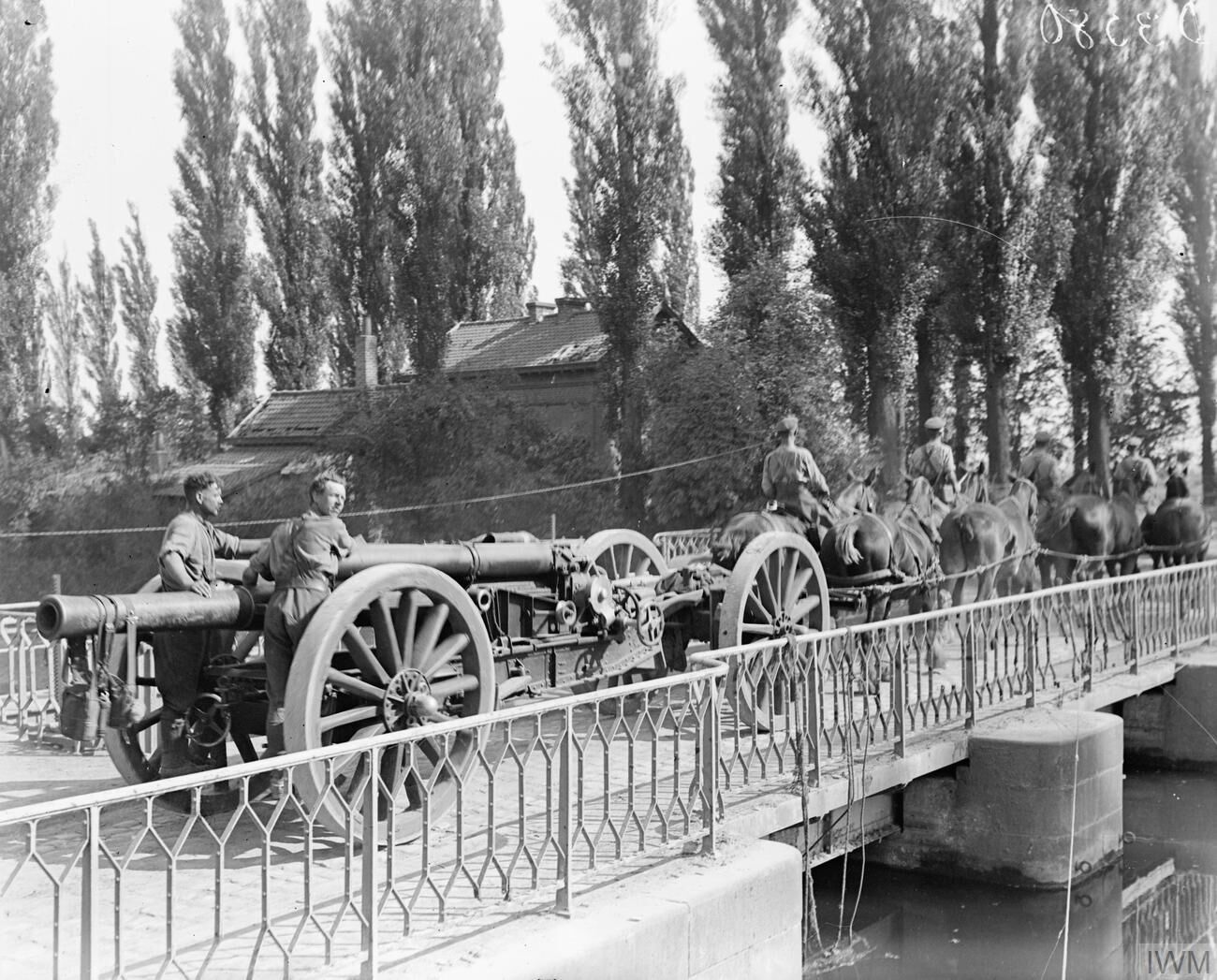
A 60-pounder advancing during the Hundred Days Offensive

Third Army joined in the Allied Hundred Days Offensive on 21 August, without a preliminary bombardment, but with massive artillery support once the attack began. By the end of August 62nd Bde RGA was with XVII Corps, and stayed with it for the rest of the war. The corps' task on 2 September was to capture the southernmost part of the Drocourt-Quéant Switch Line (the Wotan Stellung) where it joined the Hindenburg Line. Zero hour was 05.00, and at 06.00 the heavy guns including 62nd Bde switched from CB work to firing at the ground ahead of the advancing infantry between the D-Q and Hindenburg lines and on Quéant and other localities. The successful advance of 57th (2nd West Lancashire) Division through this ground cracked open the defences and allowed the flanking divisions to force their way through the Hindenburg Support Position and across the roads behind.

At the Second Battle of Cambrai (8–10 October 1918), XVII Corps was tasked with encircling the town of Cambrai on the south and compelling its evacuation. The heavies began a harassing bombardment on 6 October and continued this intermittently until Zero hour, 04.30 on 8 October. Despite German counter-attacks, the operation was successful.

On 12 October, XVII Corps was pursuing the Germans towards the River Selle. Patrols found the villages of Haussy, Montrécourt and Saulzoir along the river were still strongly held, so an attack by 8th Battalion Queen's Royal Regiment (West Surrey) was quickly arranged for 18.30 that evening. While the infantry advanced behind a field artillery barrage, 62nd Bde shelled the three villages for 50 minutes. The enemy soon cleared out of the part of Montrécourt on the west side of the Selle and 8th Queen's reached the river and got patrols across.

Third Army crossed the river during the Battle of the Selle by means of a surprise attack at 02.00 on 20 October under a full moon with no preliminary barrage. 126th Heavy Bty and 62nd HAG supported XVII Corps, which seized the three villages in its front and pushed on rapidly to the high ground behind. The next set-piece attack was the Battle of the Sambre. Zero hour for Third Army was 05.30 on 4 November, and 19th and 24th Divisions of XVII Corps attacked with complete success – some units advancing beyond their objectives – supported by 62nd Bde and many other guns, some of which had to move forward during the morning to bring down fire on the further objectives in the afternoon. By now the offensive had turned into a pursuit, and many of the heavy batteries had been left behind by the time fighting was ended by the Armistice.

Postwar, 126th (Camberwell) Heavy Bty was due to become A Bty in a consolidated 62nd Bde RGA, but this order was rescinded after the Treaty of Versailles and the battery was disbanded.

== Notes ==
- Maj A.F. Becke, History of the Great War: Order of Battle of Divisions, Part 2a: The Territorial Force Mounted Divisions and the 1st-Line Territorial Force Divisions (42–56), London: HM Stationery Office, 1935/Uckfield: Naval & Military Press, 2007, ISBN 1-847347-39-8.
- Maj A.F. Becke, History of the Great War: Order of Battle of Divisions, Part 3a: New Army Divisions (9–26), London: HM Stationery Office, 1938/Uckfield: Naval & Military Press, 2007, ISBN 1-847347-41-X.
- Maj A.F. Becke, History of the Great War: Order of Battle of Divisions, Part 3b: New Army Divisions (30–41) and 63rd (R.N.) Division, London: HM Stationery Office, 1939/Uckfield: Naval & Military Press, 2007, ISBN 1-847347-41-X.
- Maj A.F. Becke, History of the Great War: Order of Battle of Divisions, Part 4: The Army Council, GHQs, Armies, and Corps 1914–1918, London: HM Stationery Office, 1944/Uckfield: Naval & Military Press, 2007, ISBN 1-847347-43-6.
- David Bilton, Hull Pals, 10th, 11th 12th and 13th Battalions East Yorkshire Regiment – A History of 92 Infantry Brigade, 31st Division, Barnsley: Pen & Sword, 2014, ISBN 978-1-78346-185-1.
- Maj-Gen H.D. DePree, A History of the 38th (Welsh) and 33rd Divisions in the Last Five Weeks of the Great War (reprinted from Journal of the Royal Artillery, Vol LVIII, Nos 3 & 4, Vol LIX Nos 1, 2 & 3), Uckfield: Naval & Military Press, 2005, ISBN 978-1-84574-219-5.
- Brig-Gen Sir James E. Edmonds, History of the Great War: Military Operations, France and Belgium 1917, Vol II, Messines and Third Ypres (Passchendaele), London: HM Stationery Office, 1948/Uckfield: Imperial War Museum and Naval and Military Press, 2009, ISBN 978-1-845747-23-7.
- Brig-Gen Sir James E. Edmonds, History of the Great War: Military Operations, France and Belgium 1918, Vol IV, 8th August–26th September: The Franco-British Offensive, London: Macmillan, 1939/Uckfield: Imperial War Museum and Naval & Military, 2009, ISBN 978-1-845747-28-2.
- Brig-Gen Sir James E. Edmonds & Lt-Col R. Maxwell-Hyslop, History of the Great War: Military Operations, France and Belgium 1918, Vol V, 26th September–11th November, The Advance to Victory, London: HM Stationery Office, 1947/Imperial War Museum and Battery Press, 1993, ISBN 1-870423-06-2.
- Capt Cyril Falls, History of the Great War: Military Operations, France and Belgium 1917, Vol I, The German Retreat to the Hindenburg Line and the Battle of Arras, London: Macmillan, 1940/London: Imperial War Museum & Battery Press/Uckfield: Naval and Military Press, 2009, ISBN 978-1-84574722-0.
- Gen Sir Martin Farndale, History of the Royal Regiment of Artillery: Western Front 1914–18, Woolwich: Royal Artillery Institution, 1986, ISBN 1-870114-00-0.
- J.B.M. Frederick, Lineage Book of British Land Forces 1660–1978, Vol II, Wakefield: Microform Academic, 1984, ISBN 1-85117-009-X.
- Jack Horsfall & Nigel Cave, Battleground Europe: Somme: Serre, London: Leo Cooper, 1996, ISBN 0-85052-508-X.
- G.I.S. Inglis, The Kensington Battalion: Never Lost a Yard of Trench, Barnsley: Pen & Sword, 2010, ISBN 978-1-84884-247-2.
- Andrew Jackson, Accrington's Pals: The Full Story, Barnsley, Pen & Sword, 2013, ISBN 9781-84884-469-8.
- John Lee, 'The British Divisions at Third Ypres', in Peter H. Liddle (ed), Passchendaele in Perspective: The Third Battle of Ypres, London: Leo Cooper, 1997, ISBN 0-85052-552-7.
- Maj J. Macartney-Filgate, History of the 33rd Divisional Artillery in the War 1914–1918, Uckfield: Naval & Military Press, 2005, ISBN 978-1-843429-78-4.
- Martin Middlebrook, The First Day on the Somme, 1 July 1916, London: Allen Lane 1971/Fontana, 1975, ISBN 0-00-633626-4.
- Capt Wilfred Miles, History of the Great War: Military Operations, France and Belgium 1916, Vol II, 2nd July 1916 to the End of the Battles of the Somme, London: Macmillan, 1938/Imperial War Museum & Battery Press, 1992, ISBN 0-89839-169-5.
- Lt-Col J.E. Munby (ed.), A History of the 38th (Welsh) Division, London: Hugh Rees, 1920/Uckfield: Naval & Military Press, 2007, ISBN 978-1-84342-583-0.
- Lt-Col Graham Seton-Hutchinson, The Thirty-Third Division in France and Flanders, 1915–1919, London: Waterlow & Sons 1921/Uckfield: Naval & Military Press, 2004, ISBN 978-1-84342-995-1.
- Instructions Issued by The War Office During August 1914, London: HM Stationery Office, 1916.
- Instructions Issued by The War Office During July, 1915, London: HM Stationery Office.
- Instructions Issued by The War Office During September, 1915, London: HM Stationery Office.
- Instructions Issued by The War Office During June, 1916, London: HM Stationery Office.
- Leon Wolff, In Flanders Fields: The 1917 Campaign, London: Longmans, 1959/Corgi, 1966.
- Mitchell A. Yockelson, Borrowed Soldiers: Americans under British Command, 1918, Norman, OK: University of Oklahoma Press, 2008, ISBN 978-0-8061-3919-7.

== External sources ==
- Commonwealth Wars Graves Commission records
- Dulwich Society
- The Long, Long Trail
