= VF-33 (1942–1945) =

Fighting Squadron 33
- Active: 6 August 1942 – 19 November 1945
- Country: United States
- Branch: United States Navy
- Type: Fighter
- Nickname: Hellcats
- Engagements: World War II

Aircraft flown
- Fighter: F6F-3/-5 Hellcat

Fighting Squadron 33, or VF-33, was an aviation unit of the United States Navy. Originally established as Escort-Scouting Squadron 16 or VGS-16 on 6 August 1942, it was redesignated as Composite Squadron 16 or VC-16 on 1 March 1943, redesignated as VF-33 on 15 August 1943, and disestablished on 19 November 1945. It was the first US Navy squadron to be designated as VF-33.

== Operational history ==
VF-33, equipped with F6F Hellcats, was first deployed to Munda where they supported the New Georgia Campaign.

While deployed in the Solomons, VF-33 was credited with 60 Japanese aircraft shot down, and produced three aces: Lt.(jg) Frank E. Schnieder with seven kills, Lt. C. K. Hildebrandt with five kills, and Lt.(jg) James J. Kinsella also with five kills, three with VF-33 and two with VF-72 in the F4F-4 Wildcat.

== See also ==
- History of the United States Navy
- List of inactive United States Navy aircraft squadrons
- List of United States Navy aircraft squadrons
