= 33 Battalion (SWATF) =

33 Battalion/701 Battalion
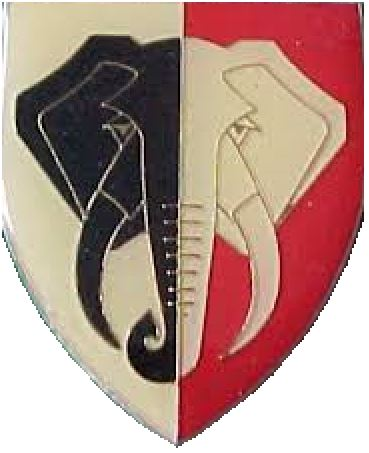
- SWATF 33/701 Battalion emblem
- Active: 1977
- Country: Namibia, South Africa
- Allegiance: South Africa
- Branch: South African Army,
- Type: Light Infantry
- Part of: South West African Territorial Force
- Garrison/HQ: Mpacha, Northern Namibia
- Nickname(s): Eastern Caprivi Battalion

Insignia
- Part of the South West African Territorial Force

33 Battalion or the Eastern Caprivi Battalion, was a light infantry battalion that was part of the SWATF.

== History ==
=== Origin ===
33 Battalion was established in 1977 under the command of Major G. Preton-Thomas with a strength of one company.

The main base was at Mpacha in Sector 70 or the Caprivi Strip.

=== Operations ===
The unit was mainly deployed in the Caprivi, but took part in a number of external operations into Zambia and from 1978 deployed companies into Kavango, Kaokaland and Owambo. During these operations the unit lost 8 Lozi and 2 South African members.

=== Renaming ===
The South West Africa Territory Force SWATF renumbered battalion numbers according to their geographical positioning on the border. The prefix 10 pertained to battalions operating to the west of the Kavango River, 20 to the Kavango or central region and 70 to the eastern region. Under this system, 33 Battalion was renamed 701 Battalion in 1980.

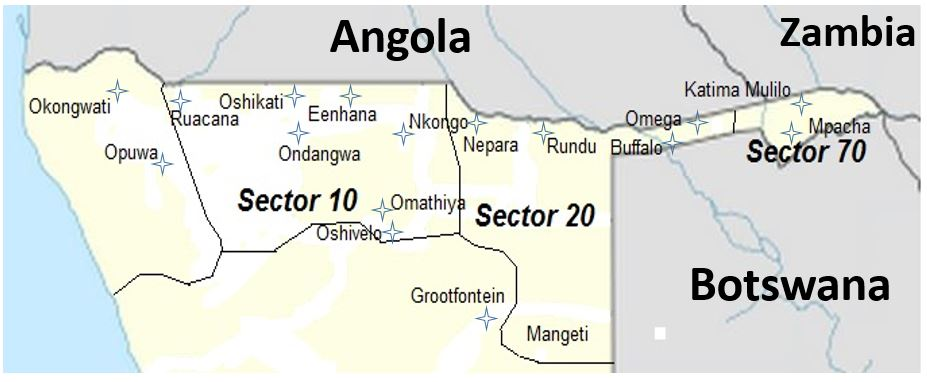
SWATF Northern Sector Map

=== Attachments ===
From 1983, a company of marines was attached.

33 Battalion also had an attached SWATF armoured car squadron and an artillery battery.

=== Insignia ===
The units flash was officially introduced during 1982 under the command of Commandant J.A. Victor.

== List of casualties ==
1985, Basson, J.L. Cav 1988, Thomas, J.A. Lt
