= Hornoy-le-Bourg =

- Commune
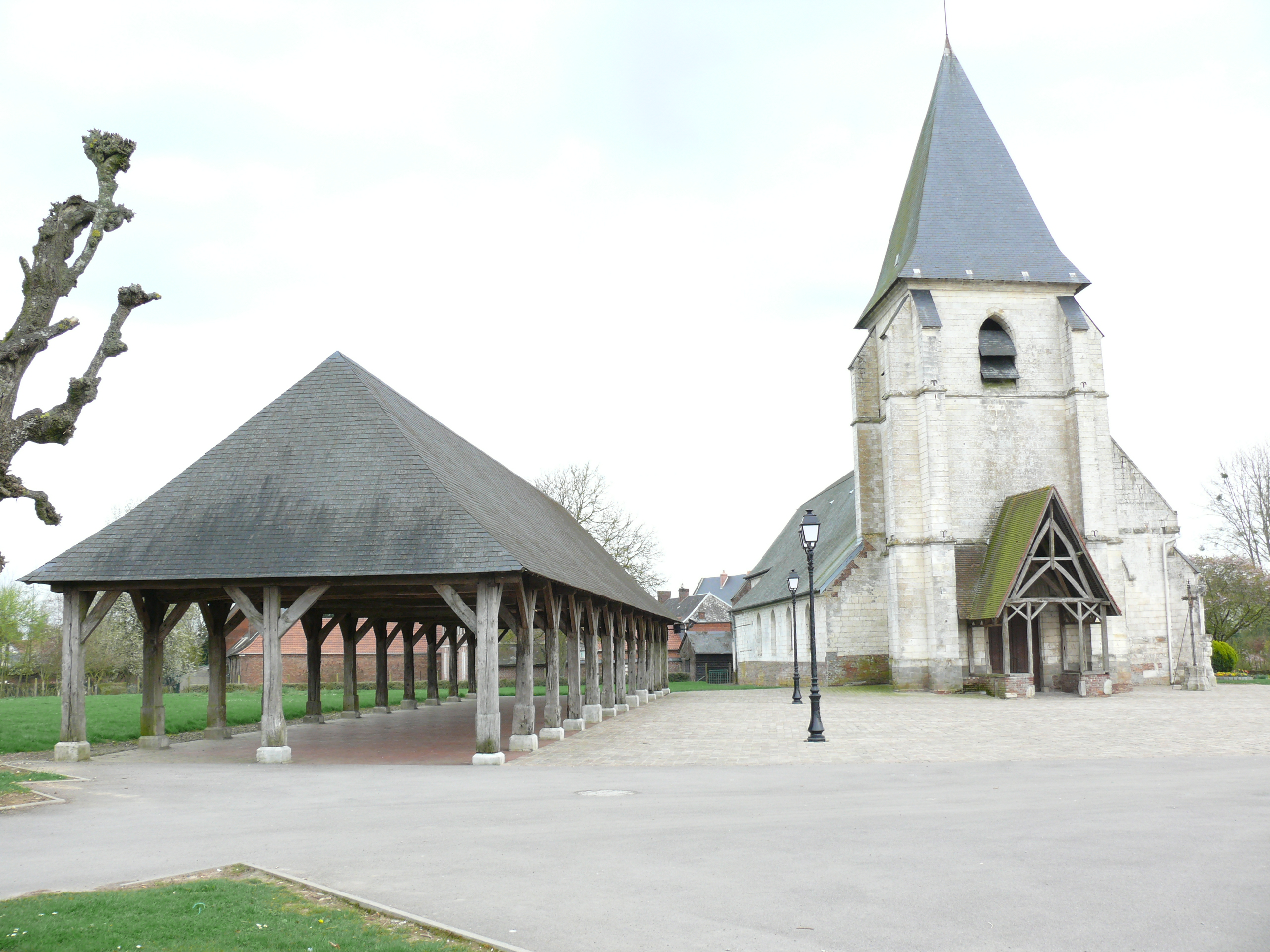
- The church and covered market in Hornoy-le-Bourg

- Coat of arms
- Location of Hornoy-le-Bourg
- Location within France Location within Hauts-de-France
- Coordinates: 49°50′46″N 1°54′08″E
- Country: France
- Region: Hauts-de-France
- Department: Somme
- Arrondissement: Amiens
- Canton: Poix-de-Picardie
- Intercommunality: CC Somme Sud-Ouest

Government
  - Mayor (2020–2026): James Froidure
- Area^{1}: 51.23 km^{2} (19.78 sq mi)
- Elevation: 166 m (545 ft)
- Highest elevation: 201 m (659 ft)
- Lowest elevation: 68 m (223 ft)
- Population (2023): 1,622
  - Density: 31.66/km^{2} (82.00/sq mi)
- Time zone: UTC+01:00 (CET)
  - Summer (DST): UTC+02:00 (CEST)
- INSEE/Postal code: 80443 /80640
- ^{1} French Land Register data, which excludes lakes, ponds, glaciers > 1 km^{2} (0.386 sq mi or 247 acres) and river estuaries.

Hornoy-le-Bourg (French pronunciation: [ɔʁnwa lə buʁ]) is a commune in the Somme department in Hauts-de-France in northern France.

== Geography ==
The commune is situated at the junction of the D18 and D211 roads, some 16 miles (26 km) southwest of Amiens.

It is the second largest commune of the Somme department (by area).

== Places of interest ==
- The church
- The market hall
- The war memorial

== Population ==
Historical population
| Year | Pop. | ±% p.a. |
|---|---|---|
| 1968 | 1,607 | — |
| 1975 | 1,503 | −0.95% |
| 1982 | 1,467 | −0.35% |
| 1990 | 1,448 | −0.16% |
| 1999 | 1,449 | +0.01% |
| 2007 | 1,663 | +1.74% |
| 2012 | 1,670 | +0.08% |
| 2017 | 1,679 | +0.11% |
| 2023 | 1,622 | −0.57% |
Source: INSEE

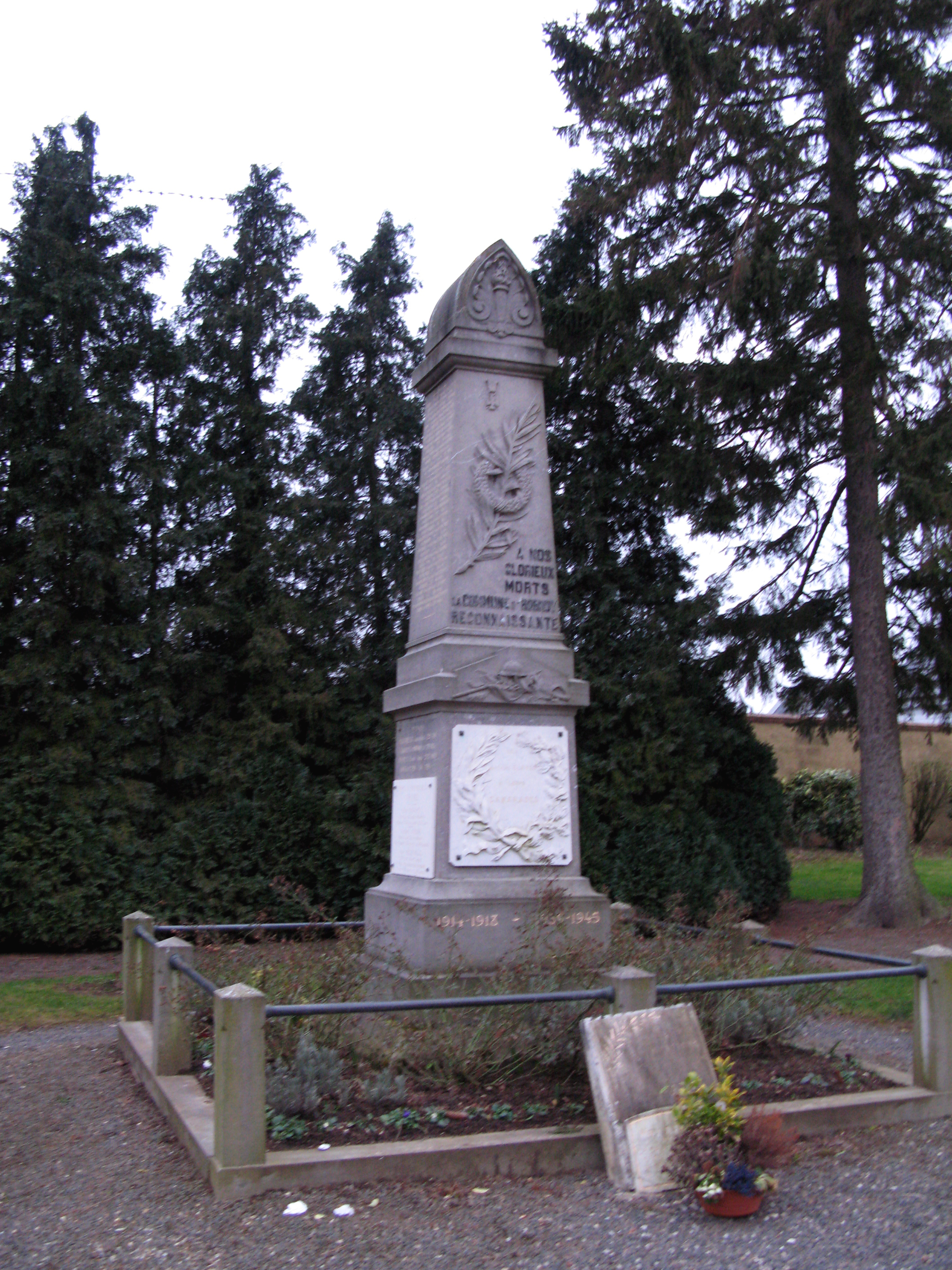

== Personalities ==
- Countess of Dompierre d'Hornoy, Marquise of Florian, née Marie-Elisabeth Mignot, niece of Voltaire, was buried here in 1771.
- Jean-Pierre Claris de Florian, poet, often stayed at Hornoy.

== See also ==
- Communes of the Somme department
