= 33 1/3 RPM =

33 1/3 RPM may refer to:

- The playing speed, in rotations per minute, of LP records
- The playing speed of some extended play records
