= 33rd Waffen Cavalry Division of the SS (3rd Hungarian) =

German cavalry division

- Division emblem
- Active: December 1944 – January 1945
- Country: Nazi Germany
- Branch: Waffen-SS
- Type: Cavalry
- Size: Division

33rd Waffen Cavalry Division of the SS (3rd Hungarian) (German: 33. Waffen-Kavallerie-Division der SS (ungarische Nr. 3)) was an SS cavalry division formed from Hungarian volunteers in December 1944.

It never had more than one regiment when it was absorbed by the 26th Waffen Grenadier Division of the SS (2nd Hungarian) the following month, after it was almost destroyed in the fighting near Budapest.

There is also some doubt that there ever was a 33rd Waffen Cavalry Division of the SS (3rd Hungarian) in anything but name.

The number 33 was re-issued and given to the Charlemagne Division.
