= 33 Squadron =

33 Squadron or 33rd Squadron may refer to:

- No. 33 Squadron IAF, a unit of the Indian Air Force
- No. 33 Squadron (Finland), a unit of the Finnish Air Force
- No. 33 Squadron RAAF, a unit of the Royal Australian Air Force
- No. 33 Squadron RAF, a unit of the United Kingdom Royal Air Force
- 33 Squadron (Portugal), a unit of the Portuguese Air Force
- 33rd Cyberspace Operations Squadron, a unit of the United States Air Force
- 33rd Flying Training Squadron, a unit of the United States Air Force
- 33rd Reconnaissance Squadron, a unit of the United States Air Force
- 33rd Rescue Squadron, a unit of the United States Air Force
- 33rd Special Operations Squadron, a unit of the United States Air Force
- 33rd Troop Carrier Squadron, a unit of the United States Army Air Forces
- VC-33 (Composite Squadron 33), a unit of the United States Navy
- VF-33 (Fighter Squadron 33), a unit of the United States Navy
- VF-33 (1942–1945), a unit of the United States Navy
- VP-33 (Patrol Squadron 33), a unit of the United States Navy
- VS-33 (Scouting Squadron 33), a unit of the United States Navy
- VA(AW)-33 (All-Weather Attack Squadron 33), a unit of the United States Navy
- VAW-33 (Carrier Airborne Early Warning Squadron 33), a unit of the United States Navy
- VAQ-33 (Electronic Attack Squadron 33), a unit of the United States Navy

== See also ==
- 33rd Division (disambiguation)
- 33rd Brigade (disambiguation)
- 33rd Regiment (disambiguation)
