= 33rd Brigade =

33rd Brigade or 33rd Infantry Brigade may refer to:

== Australia ==
- 33rd Brigade (Australia), a unit of the Australian Army

== Canada ==
- 33 Canadian Brigade Group, a unit of the Canadian Army

== Greece ==
- 33rd Mechanized Infantry Brigade (Greece)

== India ==
- 33rd Indian Brigade of the British Indian Army in the First World War
- 33rd Indian Infantry Brigade of the British Indian Army in the Second World War

== Iran ==
- 33rd Al-Mahdi Airborne Brigade

== Japan ==
- 33rd Independent Mixed Brigade (Imperial Japanese Army)
- 33rd Mixed Brigade (Imperial Japanese Army)

== Ukraine ==
- 33rd Mechanized Brigade (Ukraine)

== United Kingdom ==
- 33rd (Western) Anti-Aircraft Brigade
- 33rd Armoured Brigade (United Kingdom)
- 33rd Infantry Brigade (United Kingdom)
- 33rd Brigade, Royal Field Artillery
- 33rd Divisional Trench Mortar Brigade

== United States ==
- 33rd Infantry Brigade Combat Team (United States), a unit of the United States Army

== See also ==
- 33rd Division (disambiguation)
- 33rd Regiment (disambiguation)
- 33rd Squadron (disambiguation)
