= 33rd Regiment =

33rd Regiment may refer to:

== Infantry regiments ==
- 33rd Regiment (Vietnam People's Army), a unit of the PAVN
- 33rd Punjabis, an infantry regiment of the British Indian Army
- 33rd Regiment (3rd Burma Bn.) Madras Infantry, a unit of the British Indian Army
- 33rd Regiment of Foot, a unit of the British Army
- 33rd Infantry Regiment (United States), a unit of the United States Army

== Cavalry regiments ==
- 33rd Light Dragoons, a cavalry regiment of the British Army

== Engineering regiments ==
- 33 Combat Engineer Regiment, a unit of the Canadian Army
- 33 Engineer Regiment (EOD), a unit of the British Army's Royal Engineers

== Signal regiments ==
- 33 Signal Regiment (Canada), a unit of the Royal Canadian Signals Corps
- 33 (Lancashire and Cheshire) Signal Regiment, a unit of the British Army

== Artillery regiments ==
- 33rd (St Pancras) Searchlight Regiment, Royal Artillery, a unit of the British Army
- 33rd Field Artillery Regiment, a unit of the United States Army

== American Civil War regiments ==
- 33rd United States Colored Infantry Regiment, a unit of the Union Army
- 33rd Wisconsin Volunteer Infantry Regiment, a unit of the Union Army
- 33rd Pennsylvania Infantry, a unit of the Union Army
- 33rd Ohio Infantry, a unit of the Union Army
- 33rd New York Volunteer Infantry Regiment, a unit of the Union Army
- 33rd Regiment Kentucky Volunteer Infantry, a unit of the Union Army
- 33rd Illinois Volunteer Infantry Regiment, a unit of the Union Army
- 33rd Indiana Infantry Regiment, a unit of the Union Army
- 33rd Iowa Volunteer Infantry Regiment, a unit of the Union Army
- 33rd Virginia Infantry, a unit of the Confederate States Army
- 33rd Tennessee Infantry Regiment, a unit of the Confederate States Army
- 33rd Regiment Alabama Infantry, a unit of the Confederate States Army
- 33rd Arkansas Infantry Regiment, a unit of the Confederate States Army

== See also ==
- 33rd Division (disambiguation)
- 33rd Brigade (disambiguation)
- 33 Squadron (disambiguation)
