= Robert Row =

English fascist (1915–1999)

Robert Row

Robert Row (1915–1999) was an English fascist from Lancaster, a member of Oswald Mosley's British Union of Fascists And Union Movement who was detained by the British government under Defence Regulation 18B during the Second World War. After the war, he wrote and edited British fascist publications and remained a believer in Mosley and British Fascism until his death.

== Early life ==
Robert Row was born in 1915. His father worked for Waring & Gillow and was sent to Cuba to decorate the House of Assembly. He left school in 1931, by his own account during the Sterling crisis of that year, when Britain left the Gold Standard. In 1998, he recalled a succession of low-paid jobs and an environment of boarded-up shops in his local high street during his youth: "The times were desperate and after more of the same I joined the Blackshirts in 1934" (the BUF).

== Fascist career ==
In Oswald Mosley's British Union of Fascists, Row saw policies that would put Britain first and "banish the slump". He became highly active in the movement, but with the outbreak of the Second World War, he was detained by the British government under the newly introduced Defence Regulation 18B. He spent time at Walton prison and was also held for a time at a prison camp near Huyton, where the most prominent inmate was John Beckett. Both associated freely during their incarceration, although they argued regularly. Beckett had left the BUF in 1938. He was released late during the war, joined the British Army and served in Palestine.

After the war, Row worked as an agricultural labourer in Surrey and began to send articles to Union, the organ of the Union Movement, the successor to the BUF. The editor, Alexander Raven Thomson, appointed Row as deputy editor of Union in the 1950s; Row became the editor after Thomson's death in 1955. The paper became The National European in 1964 and Action in 1966 before the Union Movement also changed its party name to Action in 1973. He was editor of all of those titles until the closure of Sanctuary Press in 1992. He also edited Lodestar with Jeffrey Hamm from 1985 to 1992.

Row was assaulted or intimidated several times during his fascist activities. In 1963, six young men of the antifascist Yellow Star Movement broke into the Union Movement headquarters at 302 Vauxhall Bridge Road and assaulted Row and Keith Gibson, the Union Movement's political secretary. All six were arrested and later fined (one aged 16 was bound over) at the Old Bailey after pleading guilty to assault and causing damage to property. According to testimony, Row was made to kneel on the floor and rip up copies of Action. Both Row and Gibson required hospital treatment. Soon afterward, according to Comrade, he was attacked again by the same group on his way home from work.

Row was close to Raven Thomson politically and in the early 1950s supported his view that the Union Movement should move closer to neo-Nazism, which was gaining some support in Germany, rather than Mosley's unpopular "Europe a Nation" policy. Later, with Jeffrey Hamm, he was a key figure in Action. Increasingly, in the postwar decades, Row through his writings became a unifying force for the dwindling and aging band of former BUF members, as the movement engaged less in political action and more in rhetoric and nostalgia for the BUF.

== Death ==
Row remained a committed fascist until his death and continued to contribute to publications of the offshoots of the BUF until the end, such as Comrade, newsletter of the Friends of Oswald Mosley. He died in 1999 after a minor operation at 83. His ashes were scattered by his niece in Lancashire at a site on which he and his brothers cycled in his youth. He never married.

== Selected publications ==
- Union Movement – The answer to the slump. Union, London, c. 1948.
- Sir Oswald Mosley: British patriot and national European. European Action, n.d.
- The coloured question in Britain: Cause and solution. Sanctuary Press, n.d.
