= League of Saint George =

British neo-Fascist organisation

- Founder: Keith Thompson; Mike Griffin
- Founded: 1974
- Split from: Action Party
- Newspaper: The League Review; The League Sentinel
- Membership (1970s): 50–100
- Ideology: British fascism Europe a Nation
- Political position: Far-right

The League of St George is a neo-fascist organisation based in the United Kingdom. It has defined itself as a "non-party, non-sectarian political club" and, whilst forging alliances with different groups, has eschewed close links with other extremist political parties.

== History ==
A flowchart showing the history of the early British fascist movement

The League was formed around 1974 as a political club by Keith Thompson and Mike Griffin as a breakaway from the Action Party, founded by British fascist Oswald Mosley. The League sought to continue what it saw as a purer form of the ideas of Mosley than those offered by then leader Jeffrey Hamm. In the 1970s the League became a political home for the more intellectual adherents of "Neo-Nazi" ideology, particularly those who wanted a united Europe with a European-derived population, a continuation of Mosley's Europe a Nation policy. Alongside this the League also followed Mosley's lead in endorsing Irish republicanism, something of a change from their contemporaries in the British far right who reserved their support for Ulster loyalism. The League was never intended to be a political party, but more of a social, intellectual, and cultural organization, albeit with the ultimate political aim of promoting European people and their culture. Intended as an exclusive club for what were seen as the leading minds on the British far right, its membership tended to be restricted to around 50–100 members. Indeed, membership of the League was restricted to those invited to join only.

The group often had a torrid relationship with the far right parties, and indeed the National Front barred its members from joining the League in 1977. Around this time Spearhead even included articles claiming that the League was in fact a cult dominated by clandestine leaders, secret oaths and profane initiation ceremonies. Nonetheless, individual members maintained ties to both organisations, with some contributing to both Spearhead and The League Review. Similarly the British Movement, which had originally co-operated with the League, eventually severed its ties over the Northern Irish issue. The Enemy Within is an account of the League of St George written by a former member, the cartoonist Robert Edwards, who founded the pro-Mosley European Action UK pressure group in 2005.

== International contacts ==
Adopting the emblem of the Arrow Cross, the League sought to forge links with like-minded groups in Europe, and took part in international neo-Nazi rallies at Diksmuide in Belgium, where it forged links with the Vlaamse Militanten Orde and the National States' Rights Party. Eschewing the route of electoral politics, the League instead sought to set itself up as an umbrella group for National Socialists of any affiliation, although the League did work closely with first the British Movement and then the British National Party when it was founded (with Thompson and John Graeme Wood attending the party's inaugural meeting while claiming to speak for the League).

Steve Brady, a former activist in the short-lived National Party (and who retained close links to the Ulster Defence Association despite the League's avowed support for Irish republicanism), was appointed International Liaison Officer in 1978 and helped to oversee the development of links with groups internationally such as the Faisceaux Nationalistes Européens of France, founded by Mark Fredriksen, and Italy's Nuclei Armati Rivoluzionari (NAR). Brady also wrote a column in League Review, under the nom-de-plume Heimdall. The group also gained support in South Africa amongst some leading supporters of the Herstigte Nasionale Party who were responsible for funding the League during the early 1980s.

== 'Safehousing' ==
The League went into hiatus in the early 1980s after an episode of ITV current affairs show World in Action exposed its attempts to set up safe houses for suspected Italian terrorists, based on information given by Ray Hill, who had been active in the League.

== Subsequent activities ==
Following these revelations the group became less active, but did not close down altogether. Its magazine, The National Review, received some attention in far-right circles in 1986 when Colin Jordan published an article calling for the development of an underground struggle. This article was credited with attempts to revive the British Movement and to set up other groups to carry out Jordan's ideas.

In 1996 it was alleged in Searchlight that members of the League had recruited mercenaries for a mission in South Africa organised by Constand Viljoen with the aim of assassinating the country's leaders and damaging its infrastructure. Ultimately the plan was foiled by the South African secret service and by a change in strategy by Viljoen, who abandoned his Afrikaner Volksfront in order to lead the Freedom Front.

It continues to exist under other leadership to this day. Previously publishing a regular monthly magazine, The League Review, which had a comparatively wide European readership, it now publishes a quarterly journal, The League Sentinel.

The group was featured in Bill Buford's Among the Thugs where the author commented to a member that his ideas of leaving urban life and returning to the soil recalled those of the Pol Pot and the Khmer Rouge.

== Members ==
Leading members of the League have included Dagenham-based John Harrison, millionaire Robin Rushton, former Mosley's Union Movement member, speaker and election candidate Keith Thompson, Mike Griffin, and Roger Clare, who has also been active in South Africa and New Zealand. Ian Souter Clarence, the former head of Column 88, was a member, while both publisher Anthony Hancock and National Front and National Party veteran Denis Pirie were also closely associated with the group.

== Media coverage ==
An article by Ian Cobain in The Guardian dated 24 November 2016 reported that the League of St George of today is mainly active in publishing and distributing fascist books. The League's publishing arm is Steven Books.

== In popular culture ==
In 2013, a theatrical production and musical called League of St George based on "the fascist brotherhood of the League of St George" toured the UK including the Edinburgh Festival Fringe, the Corbett Theatre in Loughton, Essex and the Hope Theatre in London.

== Bibliography ==
- R. Hill & A. Bell, The Other Face of Terror- Inside Europe’s Neo-Nazi Network, London: Collins, 1988
