= John Warburton (fascist) =

John Warburton in his British Union of Fascists uniform.

John Warburton (30 April 1919 – 26 August 2004) was an English fascist and press photographer. He was an assistant district leader for the Clapham branch of Sir Oswald Mosley's British Union of Fascists (BUF) before the Second World War, and afterwards was a key member of the Union Movement, the founder editor of Comrade, and the senior Council member of Friends of Oswald Mosley.

== Early life ==
John Warburton was born in Bury, Lancashire, on 30 April 1919, the son of a blacksmith who died when Warburton was 13. His mother's maiden name was Christian. He had a brother, Edmund ("Ned"). John was educated at St George's Church of England School at Unsworth, Lancashire.

The brothers became interested in Sir Oswald Mosley's British Union of Fascists (BUF) after attending a public meeting at Belle Vue, Manchester. They both joined the British Union Cadets and enjoyed the camaraderie and sense of purpose that they found there. John had at first been attracted to communism but was deterred by its lack of patriotism. At 14, he started work as a clerk at Manchester Dyers. Both brothers were present at the Battle of Stockton, a violent clash between the BUF and a larger number of communists and Labour supporters during which Ned received an injury that cost him an eye after potatoes were thrown with razor blades embedded in them. Some time later, John contracted scarlet and rheumatoid fever and spent five months in hospital. His mother was advised to take him south for the warmer weather, and the family settled in Clapham, London, in the autumn of 1936. John found an office job with a firm of dried fruit importers in Camberwell.

== British Union of Fascists ==
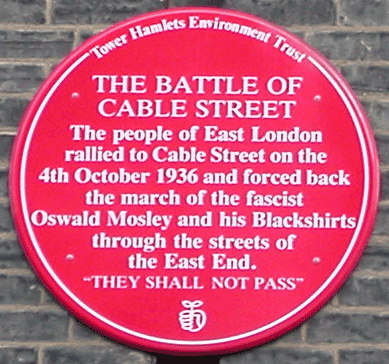
Plaque in Dock Street commemorating the Battle of Cable Street.

Warburton first saw Sir Oswald Mosley at a rally on Clapham Common: "He was striding along, and to me he was a god. As I matured and grew older, I realised he wasn't a god. But he was the nearest approach to it I'd ever met". Warburton and his brother were at the Battle of Cable Street on 4 October 1936 and at Mosley's Limehouse met ten days later. It was at that meeting that Warburton began to record events with his camera, which led to a long career as a press photographer.

He became assistant district leader for the Clapham branch of the BUF and was also a member of the Battersea branch. He acted as a steward at BUF rallies; ejected hecklers, sometimes forcibly; and once had to rescue Unity Mitford after she had become part of a left-wing "Save Spain" rally in Hyde Park while she was wearing a swastika badge.

== Second World War ==
Warburton missed the massive Earl's Court rally of the BUF on 16 July 1939, he had volunteered for the British Army and been told to report to the Queen's West Surrey Regiment the day before. Probably as a consequence of his army service, he was not detained under Defence Regulation 18B during the Second World War as many other fascists were, although his home was searched by police officers from Special Branch and his political papers seized. He was discharged from the army on medical grounds after 18 months and return to civilian life as an agency press photographer.

In 1942, Warburton married Joan C. Thorpe (died 1997) in Battersea. His wife had been a member of Mosley's New Party, the predecessor to the BUF in the 1930s.

== Post-war ==
After the end of the Second World War, Warburton worked for the London afternoon papers, the Evening Standard, the Evening News and The Star, and later for the Sport and General agency. He continued to be highly active in fascist circles and was a founding member of the Union Movement in 1948.

In the 1970s, he worked with Bernard Levin of The Times, to fight an attempted left-wing takeover of the National Union of Journalists.

Warburton was the senior Council member for the Friends of Oswald Mosley (founded 1982) which represented the tail end of the movement started by Mosley in the 1930s. and the founder and editor as "John Christian" of Comrade in 1986. With help from Robert Row, Warburton campaigned to set the record right, as they saw it, about Mosley and the BUF and to rehabilitate people unfairly tarred by detention under regulation 18B during the Second World War. They argued for the release of official records relating to those detentions and Warburton spent many years researching the names of the detainees. His findings were eventually published in 2005 with a second revised edition published in 2008. Warburton was also instrumental in securing for the University of Birmingham, the papers of Edward Jeffrey Hamm.

== Death ==
Warburton died on 26 August 2004.

== Selected publications ==
- The Hell of Ham Common: The secrets of Britain's war-time torture camps. European Action, n.d. (With Charlie Watts)
- The Defence Regulation 18B British Union detainees list. Friends of Oswald Mosley, London, 2005. (Revised edition 2008) (With Jeffrey Wallder)
