= Victor Burgess =

British fascist figure (1919–1999)

Victor Cecil Burgess (25 January 1919 – 2 November 1999) was a British fascist who was one of the principal figures in the British League of Ex-Servicemen and Women (BLESMAW).

== Career ==
After the outbreak of the Second World War, Burgess was briefly detained by the British government under the newly-introduced Defence Regulation 18B.

In 1942, Burgess set up a distribution centre for anti-Semitic literature for the British Union of Fascists in Edgware, Middlesex. According to Graham Macklin, Burgess was lucky to escape prosecution for seditious libel.

By 1944, Burgess, along with Jeffrey Hamm, had taken control of the BLESMAW. The organisation had been founded as an alternative to the Royal British Legion in 1937 and held its first meeting in Hyde Park on 4 November 1944. It promoted itself as a fascist organisation that endorsed racial purity and "Britain for the British" and inspired a hostile reaction from the crowd. Under Hamm and Burgess, the group became active in East London, where it was involved in street violence. Burgess was ousted from the group by 1946, however, as Hamm viewed him as a rival for the leadership.

Burgess then linked up with Alexander Raven Thomson in his group the Union of British Freedom, a network designed to co-ordinate the activities of several small regional discussion groups that were sympathetic to Mosley.

Burgess was well regarded by other Mosleyites in the immediate postwar period for his habit of delivering anti-Semitic speeches on Friday nights at Hampstead Heath although many of those in attendance were Jewish. During one such speech, he was allegedly attacked with a razor by members of the 43 Group. However, his olive skin also led to rumours that he was of Romani descent. Another rumour was that his wife, Olive, had been a communist, which was true, as she had served as a member of the Communist Party of Great Britain's Hendon branch.

As a sideline, Burgess imported pornographic magazines from the United States, a source of mirth for some of his fellow members, but that was ultimately ended when one of his political colleagues reported Burgess to the police for what he considered an immoral practice.

Joining the Union Movement (UM) upon its formation, he became head of the influential Kensington branch and was initially required to work alongside Hamm at the party's headquarters. However, tensions between the two men were such that Mosley was eventually forced to end the arrangement and to send Hamm to Manchester to take charge of the northern section of the party.

In 1949, Burgess stood as a local councillor in Kensington South, London. He received 2.5% of the vote and was not elected.

The UM went into decline after Mosley's decision to move to Ireland in 1951. In an attempt to arrest that trend, Burgess and his associate Derek Lesley-Jones set up the Special Propaganda Service, a group of 18 activists whose twin roles were to travel the country supplying local branches with propaganda material as well as to infiltrate Communist Party events and to cause disturbances. However, internal divisions within the UM saw that initiative abandoned, which made Burgess resign from the UM in February 1953.

== Sources ==
- An early history of Union Movement. A European Action Publication.
- Thompson, Keith. Victor Burgess: Leadership, idealism and courage. Steven Books. ISBN 9781904911777
