= Jean-François Thiriart =

Belgian political theorist

- Born: 22 March 1922; Brussels, Belgium
- Died: 23 November 1992 (aged 70)
- Occupation: Political theorist
- Known for: his national bolshevik ideology, serving in the SS and being the founder of Jeune Europe

Jean-François Thiriart (French pronunciation: [ʒɑ̃ fʁɑ̃swa tiʁjaʁ]; 22 March 1922 – 23 November 1992), often known as Jean Thiriart, was a Belgian far-right political theorist.

Coming from a left-wing background, during the Second World War he was a collaborator with the Nazi Third Reich, as a result of which he served a prison sentence. In the 1960s, he founded and directed the transnational Jeune Europe (Young Europe) movement. He was the theorist of European national communism, a synthesis of revolutionary nationalism and Pan-European nationalism, a form of revolutionary nationalism transposed up to the scale of Europe as a unitary state.

== Youth ==
Coming from a left-wing family, Thiriart was initially a member of some Socialist and antifascist movements. He switched to far-right politics and joined the extremist Fichte Bund. In 1940, he was associated with Les Amis du grand Reich Allemand, a group composed of former far left activists which supported collaborationism with the Third Reich. Thiriart himself served in the Waffen SS and later served time in prison for his collaboration. Upon his release, he set up in business as an optometrist.

== Cold War syncretism ==
Thiriart returned to the political scene in the 1960s, after in 1960 Belgium had granted independence to the Belgian Congo, which became the Republic of the Congo (Léopoldville), setting off the Congo Crisis. Due to his strong opposition to this development, Thiriart became associated with the Mouvement d'Action Civique (MAC), although he also became interested in a more international vision. Establishing links with French groups similarly opposed to decolonization, Thiriart eventually became a European nationalist, convinced of the need for a united Europe. As a result, he formed Jeune Europe, a movement aiming to reach out across Europe, soon founding branches in Italy, Spain, and France. In Belgium, he continued to co-operate with MAC, which enjoyed close ties to Jeune Europe.

Thiriart publicly disavowed fascism and called Nazism obsolete, but his movement was still accused of having a fascist basis, partly as a result of adopting as its emblem the Celtic cross, a symbol widely used in neo-fascism, and partly because in its weekly magazine Jeune Europe it advertised the activities of the allegedly neo-Nazi Hans-Ulrich Rudel, leader of the Deutsche Reichspartei.

With a policy that was both Anti-American and Anti-Soviet, Thiriart represented Europe as the true cradle of civilisation, and was opposed to uncontrolled immigration and imperialism, instead supporting national liberation, sovereignty and self-determination for all Europeans and what he called the "allied ethnicities" of Europe. Thiriart's views won him many enemies, on both the orthodox right and the left, this is partly due to the fact that he was highly influenced by the thinking of Francis Parker Yockey. He denied that he was a Nazi, claiming to belong to the centre of the political spectrum. Thiriart attempted to put his ideas into practice by being instrumental in the formation of the National Party of Europe, an unsuccessful attempt at creating a Europe-wide nationalist party.

Seeking to support radical revolutionaries in Latin America and Black Power movements in the United States, Thiriart began to develop the idea of creating Political Soldiers and set up training camps to facilitate indoctrination. He also became an admirer of Nicolae Ceauşescu, indicating a sympathy towards Stalinism that displayed strong Nationalist characteristics. He also admired the People's Republic of China for these same reasons. Historian Walter Laqueur called his views a form of fascist Maoism.

According to US academic George Michael, Thiriart served as an adviser to Fatah of the Palestine Liberation Organization in the 1970s.

== National Bolshevism and later life ==
Thiriart moved towards National Bolshevism and in later life he worked closely with such exponents of this idea as Aleksandr Dugin.

Thiriart was later in life a supporter of a "Euro-Soviet empire which would stretch from Dublin to Vladivostok and would also need to expand to the south, since it require(s) a port on the Indian Ocean." Dugin liked the idea so much, he made it the frontispiece of his 1997 book Foundations of Geopolitics.

As well as being a member of the small pan-European European Liberation Front, Thiriart came to spend a lot of time in Russia where he saw the potential for an explosion in European Nationalism. He is the author of several books.

Thiriart died of a heart attack in 1992.

== Major publications ==
- Un empire de 400 millions d'hommes l'Europe (Brussels: Imprimerie Sineco, 1964)
- La grand nation : 65 thèses sur l'Europe (Brussels, 1965)
- Editoriaux de Jean Thiriart (1965-1969) : la nation européenne (Charleroi: Edition Maciavel, 1969)
- The Great Nation: Unitarian Europe - From Brest To Bucharest (Manticore Press, 2018) ISBN 978-0648299684
- Istanbul, the geopolitical capital of the United States, of Europe, Russia, and Asia, trans. Alexander Jacob (Lewiston, New York: Edwin Mellen Press, 2019) ISBN 978-1495507571
- The geopolitical unification of Europe, Russia, and Central Asia : creating a unitary transcontinental multinational state, trans. Alexander Jacob (Lewiston, New York: Edwin Mellen Press, 2019) ISBN 978-1495507564

== See also ==
- National Bolshevism
- European Liberation Front
- Francis Parker Yockey
- Franco Freda
- Christian Bouchet
