= John Warburton =

John Warburton may refer to:

- John Warburton (actor) (1899 or 1903–1981), British-American actor
- John Warburton, founding member of the Unbroadcastable Radio Show
- John Warburton (Baptist) (19th century), leader in the Strict Baptist movement
- John Warburton (officer of arms) (1682–1759), antiquarian, cartographer, and collector of old manuscripts
- John Warburton (producer) (born 1964), British television producer and director
- John Warburton Paul (1916–2004), British government official
- John Warburton Sagar (1878–1941), English rugby union player and diplomat
- John Warburton (fascist) (1919–2004)
- John Warburton (died 1703), Member of Parliament for Belturbet (Parliament of Ireland constituency)
- John Warburton (died 1806), Member of Parliament for Queen's County (Parliament of Ireland constituency)
