= Keith Thompson (politician) =

British politician

Keith Thompson is a veteran figure in the British far-right who has been active in a number of movements down the years.

== Biography ==
An Odinist, Thompson was a leading member of, speaker for and election agent and candidate of Oswald Mosley's Union Movement, which he joined in the 1960s whilst completing his National Service in the Royal Air Force. In 1973 the UM was renamed the Action Party and was led by Jeffrey Hamm, Mosley's secretary. However Thompson split from the group soon afterwards.

After his resignation, Thompson, along with Mike Griffin, joined the League of Saint George, an umbrella movement of the far right (although this origin of the League has been disputed by Thompson). Thompson was the first leader of the League of St George when it was launched in 1974 and he has remained a leading figure in the organisation, but has never officially endorsed any political party, although in 1982 he did share a platform with John Tyndall and Ray Hill on a speaking tour following the announcement of the formation of the British National Party. The association was not to last however and Thompson has long since ended any involvement with the BNP.

Thompson continues to run Steven Books, as well as a more recent venture, the Searchlight Victims Support Group, which is opposed to the work of the anti-fascist magazine Searchlight and has actively sought to recruit from the Trades Union Congress. This group publishes a journal New Target. Steven Books became the subject of controversy when it was revealed that their books could be bought online through Tesco, although a Searchlight campaign has since ended this arrangement.
