= Roger Coudroy =

Member of Fatah

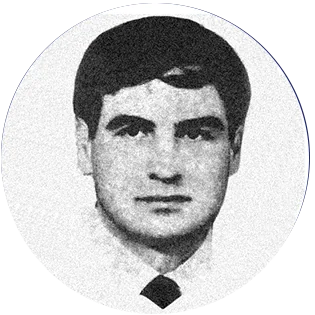
- one of the few verified pictures of Coudroy
- Born: 1935; Belgium
- Died: June 3, 1968 (aged 32–33); Palestine
- Cause of death: Gunshot wound
- Military career
- Allegiance: Fatah
- Service years: 1968
- Nickname: "Salah"
- Known for: Being the first European nationalist fighter killed in the Palestinian struggle
- Conflicts: Israeli–Palestinian conflict

Roger Coudroy, also known as Salah, (1935–1968) was a Belgian-born engineer with French citizenship, national-revolutionary activist, member of the neofascist Pan-European movement Jeune Europe and militant of the Palestinian organization Fatah. He died in 1968, shortly after joining Fatah, while engaged in fighting against the Israeli army.

== Biography ==
Born in Belgium in 1935, Coudroy was educated and employed in France, before relocating to the Middle East as an engineer, working with various companies in both Beirut and Kuwait.

While abroad, Coudroy developed sympathies for the Palestinian cause. He subsequently left his position at Peugeot in Kuwait to establish contact with Palestinian militants, acting first as an independent reporter but later joining their ranks as a fighter.

Following less than a month of training, Coudroy requested to take part in military operations against the Israeli forces. He was subsequently killed in action by Israeli soldiers during one of these actions.

Coudroy documented his experiences in a diary, posthumously published as "J'ai vécu la résistance palestinienne" ("I lived the Palestinian resistance). In the text, he outlined his motives for joining Fatah and expressed support for Palestinian nationalism and the fedayeens.

The memoir has since been translated into several languages, including Italian, Spanish and Portuguese.

== Bibliography ==
- J'ai vécu la résistance palestinienne, Roger Coudroy, 1968

== Sources ==
- Francis Balace et al., De l'avant à l'après-guerre : l'extrême droite en Belgique francophone, Brussels, De Boeck-Wesmael, 1994.
