= Jeune Europe =

Neofascist movement

Young Europe Jeune Europe
- Leader: Jean-François Thiriart
- Founded: 1962
- Dissolved: 1969
- Preceded by: Mouvement d'Action Civique
- Newspaper: La nation européenne
- Ideology: Pan-Europeanism; Neo-fascism; Anti-imperialism; National communism Nazi-Maoism; Third Position; National Bolshevism
- Political position: Syncretic
- European affiliation: National Party of Europe

Jeune Europe (French pronunciation: [ʒœn øʁɔp], "Young Europe") was a neo-fascist euro-nationalist movement formed by Jean Thiriart in Belgium. Emile Lecerf, a later editor of the Nouvel Europe Magazine, was one of Thiriart's associates.

== History ==
Following the Algerian War of Independence, Thiriart decided to look to a more Europe-wide vision and founded Jeune Europe as a result, calling for a united Europe that would be "neither Moscow nor Washington" but rather a third superpower in order that the individual states could stop being squeezed in the Cold War. Jeune Europe quickly grew in influence, with major branches opening in France, Italy and Spain, as well as minor groups in nine other countries. Its strongest following was amongst students although it attracted wider attention in part due to the strength of Thiriart's personality and his unusually syncretist message. They also participated in 1962 Conference at Venice, where they agreed to participate in the National Party of Europe, along with Oswald Mosley's Union Movement, Otto Strasser and others. Jeune Europe as a movement, and Thiriart in particular, also foresaw a future rapprochement with the Soviet Union and sought a rapprochement with Maoist China in order to oust the Americans from Europe.

Although Thiriart publicly disavowed fascism and branded Nazism obsolete, the movement was still accused of having a fascist basis, be it through adopting the Celtic cross, a symbol widely used in neo-fascism, as its emblem or advertising the activities of neo-Nazi leader Hans-Ulrich Rudel in its eponymous weekly magazine. The group also maintained links with the network of former SS officers that organised through the magazine Nation Europa. However, Thiriart's flirtation with China and the Soviet Union alienated some rank and file members for whom links with fascism were not to be eschewed and when he began to follow a more national communist path and seek contact with Nicolae Ceauşescu membership fell. Other members went in the other direction: Notably, Renato Curcio, an early member of Giovane Europa (as the group was called in Italy), who eventually switched allegiance to the communist Red Brigades.

One member of Jeune Europe, Roger Coudroy, enlisted in Fatah.

It was dissolved in 1969.

== See also ==
- Pan-European nationalism
- Pan-European identity
- New European Order
- European Liberation Front
- European Social Movement
- Ordine Nuovo
