= Charlie Watts (fascist) =

Member of the British Union of Fascists who was interned during the Second World War

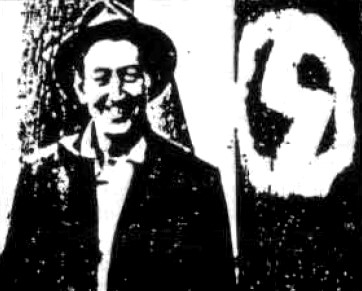
- Charlie Watts with the BUF flag
- Born: Charles Frederick Watts; 17 January 1903; Croydon, UK
- Died: 1971 (aged 67–68); Penzance, Cornwall, UK
- Known for: Activist in the British Union of Fascists, World War II detainee

Charles Frederick Watts (17 January 1903 – 1971) was a member of the British Union of Fascists who was interned during the Second World War.

In his early life, Watts served as an aircraftsman in the Royal Air Force. He later became a member of the British Union of Fascists in the 1930s and was an active recruiter. With the outbreak of the Second World War, he was arrested and interned under Defence Regulations and held first at Brixton Prison, and afterwards at Camp 020 at Latchmere House. He was moved to Ascot internment camp in Berkshire, where he became the unofficial camp leader, producing a newspaper titled The Flame and negotiating with the camp authorities on behalf of the inmates.

He was released in 1941 and the following year he was one of those who organised a party to mark Oswald Mosley's birthday at which he made a plea for unity and the Britishness of the BUF. He remained involved with British fascism after the war but admitted that the movement was blocked from reconstituting because of its association in the public mind with the Nazis. His memoir of his wartime detention, "It Has Happened Here" (1986) is part of the British Union Collection at the University of Sheffield library.

== Early life ==
Charlie Watts was born in Croydon, Surrey, on 17 January 1903 to Alfred Ernest Watts, a chartered accountant, and his wife Lilian. He was christened at St Peter's Church, Croydon, on 29 March 1903. His brother was the master mariner and ship chandler Oswald Watts.

He served as an aircraftsman in the Royal Air Force and was in the reserves until 1936.

== Fascism ==
Flag of the British Union of Fascists

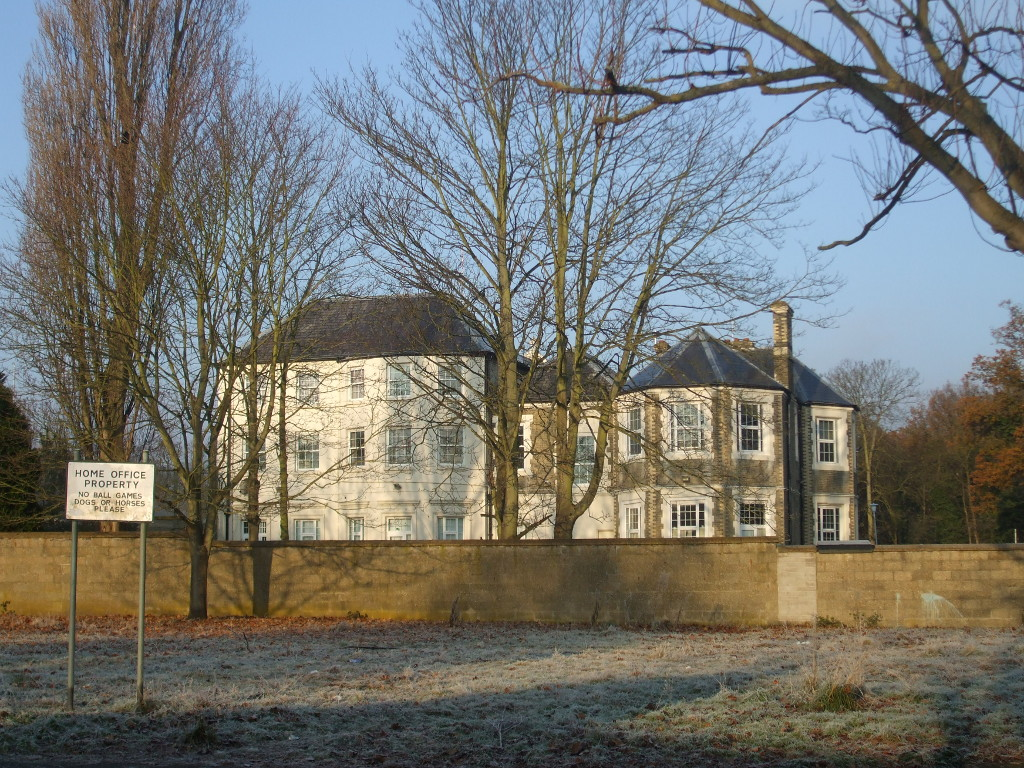
Latchmere House

Watts was a member of the British Union of Fascists (BUF) in the 1930s and rose to be district leader for the Westminster, St George's branch. He was an active recruiter, even converting communists with whom he had recently exchanged blows, such as Arthur Beaven in 1933. He was also the organiser of the BUF cab drivers group which was claimed to have 1,000 members. It was Watts who suggested to his fellow Westminster member Susan Sweney that she become the editor of the fascist newspaper Voice of the People in early 1940.

Watts worked for his brother Oswald, at his premises in London's Albemarle Street, and it was there that he was arrested by the British police Special Branch under Defence Regulation 18B (1A) on 23 May 1940 during a round-up of British fascists following the outbreak of the Second World War. He was held first at Brixton Prison before being transferred to Camp 020 at Latchmere House, near Ham Common in Richmond, for interrogation. He was subsequently moved with other BUF members to Ascot internment camp in Berkshire, a hastily arranged facility that BUF members called "Ascot Concentration Camp". There he became the unofficial camp leader, producing a newspaper titled The Flame and negotiating with the camp authorities on behalf of the inmates. He also became close friends with James Larratt Battersby. Their internment fostered a sense of grievance among the BUF members that continued long after the war and, in the case of Watts, has been described by Dave Renton as the defining moment in his life.

Many interned fascists were quickly released by the British government as posing no threat and despite the BUF having been proscribed in 1940, much fascist political structure remained in place, leading to the establishment of many small splinter fascist groups in Britain. Watts was released in 1941 with restrictions on his movements and in November 1942 he was one of those who organised a party to mark Oswald Mosley's birthday (Mosley was interned until September 1943) at which he gave a speech while wearing the by then illegal BUF uniform. He stressed that the British fascist movement should stay united and not splinter into competing groups, and that it was a British organisation and any pro-German members deserved to be interned under regulation 18b. Special Branch filed a report on his speech.

After the war, Watts remained involved with British fascism but admitted that the movement was blocked from reconstituting because of its association in the public mind with the Nazis from whom most of the former BUF members disassociated themselves. He wrote in "It Has Happened Here":

We were now being held responsible for and answerable for all the vile Nazi atrocities ... I gradually but surely came to the conclusion that I was not wasting my life on people who were not worth the effort ... I was no longer going to knock my head against a brick wall.

== Death and legacy ==
Watts died in Penzance, Cornwall, in 1971. His memoir of his wartime detention, "It Has Happened Here". The Experiences of a Political Prisoner in British Prisons and Concentration Camps during the Fifth Column panic of 1940/1 (1948) was posthumously serialised in Comrade, the journal of the Friends of Oswald Mosley, from 1986. The copy of the original manuscript is held in the British Union Collection at the University of Sheffield library along with a 1966 update titled "Last Chapter". Official papers relating to his detention are held by the British National Archives.

== Selected publications ==
- "It Has Happened Here". The Experiences of a Political Prisoner in British Prisons and Concentration Camps during the Fifth Column panic of 1940/1. Serialised in Comrade from June 1986.
- The Hell of Ham Common: The secrets of Britain's war-time torture camps. European Action, n.d. (With John Warburton)
