= Him & Her =

British television sitcom (2010–2013)

- Genre: Sitcom
- Created by: Stefan Golaszewski
- Written by: Stefan Golaszewski
- Directed by: Richard Laxton
- Starring: Russell Tovey; Sarah Solemani; Kerry Howard; Joe Wilkinson; Camille Coduri; Ricky Champ
- Ending theme: Lulu – "Boom Bang-a-Bang"
- Country of origin: United Kingdom
- Original language: English
- No. of series: 4
- No. of episodes: 25

Production
- Producers: Kenton Allen and Lyndsay Robinson
- Running time: 28-minute episodes
- Production company: Big Talk Productions

Original release
- Network: BBC Three; BBC HD
- Release: 6 September 2010 – 19 December 2013

Him & Her is a British television sitcom about a lazy twenty-something couple: Steve and Becky, who live in Walthamstow, London. It was first broadcast in the United Kingdom on BBC Three on 6 September 2010. It is written by Stefan Golaszewski and stars Russell Tovey and Sarah Solemani. The theme tune is the song "Boom Bang-a-Bang" by Lulu.

The first series aired from 6 September to 11 October 2010, and comprised six episodes. The second series aired from 1 November to 13 December 2011, and comprised seven episodes. The third series aired from 18 November to 23 December 2012, comprising seven episodes, including a 'special' Christmas episode.

The fourth (and final) series aired from 21 November to 19 December 2013 and comprised five episodes. Series 4 (subtitled "The Wedding") is based around Laura and Paul's wedding ceremony and reception, rather than the flat where Steve and Becky live.

== Series overview ==
Series 1

Becky and Steve are happy to spend their days watching DVDs in Steve's flat, but are constantly interrupted by Dan (the man who lives upstairs), Laura and Paul (Becky's sister and her fiancé), and Becky's parents.

Series 2

Becky moves into Steve's flat permanently. Becky's sister Laura and her friend Shelly have become best friends with Steve's ex-girlfriend. Dan is back with his horrid girlfriend.

Series 3

Steve contemplates proposing to Becky, but struggles to find the right moment. Becky's sister Laura is pregnant, and is letting everyone know about it. Meanwhile, the relationship between Shelly and Dan continues to blossom.

Series 4

This series is a story arc around Paul and Laura's wedding day. Each episode follows a different stage of the day, with Becky as chief bridesmaid and Steve as best man, from the early morning wake up call, through the ceremony and the speeches, to the late-night disco. Becky reveals she is pregnant with Steve's baby.

== Cast ==
=== Main cast ===
- Becky Williams (Sarah Solemani; 25 episodes), Steve's partner
- Steve Marshall (Russell Tovey; 25 episodes), Becky's partner
- Dan Perkins (Joe Wilkinson; 25 episodes), Steve & Becky's neighbour, Shelly's partner
- Laura Parker (Kerry Howard; 24 episodes), Becky's sister and Paul's fiancé later wife
- Paul Parker (Ricky Champ; 23 episodes), Laura's fiancé later husband and Graham's boyfriend
- Shelly Mills (Camille Coduri; 18 episodes), Laura's friend and Dan's partner

=== Guest cast ===
- Nigel Williams (Ralph Brown; 8 episodes), Becky and Laura's father
- Graham (Paul Clayton; 6 episodes), Paul's boyfriend
- Kieran Mills (Louis Melton; 6 episodes), Shelly's son
- Janet Marshall (Joanna Bacon; 5 episodes), Steve's mother
- Jill Williams (Marion Bailey; 5 episodes), Becky and Laura's mother
- Lee (Nick Blood; 5 episodes), Becky's ex-boyfriend
- Ian (Jonny Sweet; 5 episodes), Paul's biological half-brother
- Bianca (Georgia Eracleous; 5 episodes), Becky and Laura's cousin and a bridesmaid of Laura
- Mike (Ian Burfield; 4 episodes), Barney's father and Janet's partner
- Luke Parker (Reiss McRaye; 4 episodes), Paul's son
- Keith (Thomas Coombes; 4 episodes), Paul's friend
- Dennis (James Doherty; 4 episodes), Becky and Laura's uncle
- Sue (Victoria Willing; 4 episodes), Becky and Laura's aunt
- David (Neal Barry; 4 episodes)
- Darren (Josef Altin; 3 episodes), Paul's friend
- Gina (Diane Morgan; 3 episodes), Steve and Becky's neighbour
- Julie Taylor (Katie Lyons; 2 episodes), Steve's ex-girlfriend
- Anita (Beverly Rudd; 2 episodes), Dan's ex-girlfriend
- Barney (Blake Harrison; 2 episodes), Steve's friend and Mike's son
- Bernadette Parker (Elizabeth and Harriet Mayes; 2 episodes), Paul and Laura's baby daughter
- Jonathan (Neil Edmond; 2 episodes), Steve and Becky's neighbour
- Pete Marshall (Christopher Fulford; 1 episode), Steve's father
- Jamie (Martin Delaney; 1 episode), Becky's friend
- Lorraine (Kerry Godliman; 1 episode), Laura's wedding make-up artist
- Gay Allen (Nathasha Stokes; 1 episode), Barney's girlfriend
- Paris (Lizzie Roper; 1 episode), a prostitute Dan hires
- Mrs Bailey (Eve Pearce; 1 episode); Steve and Becky's neighbour
- Paul (Lee Long; 1 episode), Paul's friend, known as "Other Paul"
- Rashid (Seelan Gunaseelan; 1 episode), a waiter at Paul and Laura's wedding

== Critical reception ==
Most critics in the UK responded warmly to the first series; although there was some mild criticism directed towards the more crude and naturalistic aspects of the programme, reviewers reacted positively to the quality of writing and acting found on the show. In the Metro Keith Watson summed it up as "sleazy fun [but] not without a certain soiled charm", while in The Independent Brian Viner compared the set-up to that of the popular British sitcom The Royle Family, describing Him and Her as "beautifully acted... wonderfully written... and intermittently very funny indeed". In one of the more negative reviews, David Crawford of the Radio Times was a little more reserved in his praise of the show; although he admitted that "the chemistry between the two leads... [gives the] filthy comedy a warm-hearted edge" he also expressed distaste for the "lewd and crude" humour frequently on display.

In respect to the writing, The Guardian labelled the series "a witty, touching show" that "has the feel of a series of short plays", while in The Radio Times Claire Webb noted how as the series progressed she found it to be "more Beckett play than the [usual] zany fare you might expect from a BBC3 sitcom.

On reviewing the final episode, Aidan Smith of The Scotsman summarised the show as "a jam and fluff-covered gem featuring charming performances from Russell Tovey and Sarah Solemani as Steve and Becky". The series was awarded the British Academy Television Award for Best Situation Comedy in 2014.

== Episodes ==
=== Series overview ===
Series	Episodes	Originally released	
Series	Episodes	First released	Last released
1	6	6 September 2010	11 October 2010
2	7	1 November 2011	13 December 2011
3	7	18 November 2012	23 December 2012
4	5	21 November 2013	19 December 2013

=== Series 1 (2010) ===
No. overall	No. in season	Title	Directed by	Written by	Original release date
1	1	"The Toast"	Richard Laxton	Stefan Golaszewski	6 September 2010
2	2	"The Birthday"	Richard Laxton	Stefan Golaszewski	13 September 2010
3	3	"The Fancy Dress Party"	Richard Laxton	Stefan Golaszewski	20 September 2010
4	4	"The Football"	Richard Laxton	Stefan Golaszewski	27 September 2010
5	5	"The Parents"	Richard Laxton	Stefan Golaszewski	4 October 2010
6	6	"The Argument"	Richard Laxton	Stefan Golaszewski	11 October 2010

=== Series 2 (2011) ===
No. overall	No. in season	Title	Directed by	Written by	Original release date
7	1	"The Move"	Richard Laxton	Stefan Golaszewski	1 November 2011
8	2	"The Sleepover"	Richard Laxton	Stefan Golaszewski	8 November 2011
9	3	"The Get Together"	Richard Laxton	Stefan Golaszewski	15 November 2011
10	4	"The Fight"	Richard Laxton	Stefan Golaszewski	22 November 2011
11	5	"The Rollover"	Richard Laxton	Stefan Golaszewski	29 November 2011
12	6	"The Cinema"	Richard Laxton	Stefan Golaszewski	6 December 2011
13	7	"The Split"	Richard Laxton	Stefan Golaszewski	13 December 2011

=== Series 3 (2012) ===
No. overall	No. in season	Title	Directed by	Written by	Original release date
14	1	"The Ring"	Richard Laxton	Stefan Golaszewski	18 November 2012
15	2	"The Sister-in-Law"	Richard Laxton	Stefan Golaszewski	18 November 2012
16	3	"The Happy Couple"	Richard Laxton	Stefan Golaszewski	25 November 2012
17	4	"The Father-in-Law"	Richard Laxton	Stefan Golaszewski	2 December 2012
18	5	"The First Date"	Richard Laxton	Stefan Golaszewski	9 December 2012
19	6	"The Proposal"	Richard Laxton	Stefan Golaszewski	16 December 2012
20	7	"The Christmas Special"	Richard Laxton	Stefan Golaszewski	23 December 2012

=== Series 4 (2013) ===
No. overall	No. in season	Title	Directed by	Written by	Original release date
21	1	"The Morning"	Richard Laxton	Stefan Golaszewski	21 November 2013
22	2	"The Arrival"	Richard Laxton	Stefan Golaszewski	28 November 2013
23	3	"The Ceremony"	Richard Laxton	Stefan Golaszewski	5 December 2013
24	4	"The Speeches"	Richard Laxton	Stefan Golaszewski	12 December 2013
25	5	"The Disco"	Richard Laxton	Stefan Golaszewski	19 December 2013

== Home media ==
The complete first series DVD was released on 18 October 2010 and the second series on 12 November 2012. A series 1 & 2 boxset was also released on 12 November 2012. The complete third series DVD was released on 9 December 2013, and the fourth series on 13 October 2014, as well as a complete Series 1-4 collection.
