= The Secrets (TV series) =

2014 British drama television serial

- Genre: Drama
- Written by: Elinor Cook; Nick Payne; Ben Ockrent; Sarah Solemani
- Directed by: Dominic Savage
- Country of origin: United Kingdom
- Original language: English
- No. of series: 1
- No. of episodes: 5

Production
- Executive producers: Juliette Howell; Eric Fellner; Tim Bevan; Lucy Richer
- Producer: Guy Heeley
- Cinematography: Matt Gray BSC
- Running time: 30 minutes
- Production company: Working Title Television

Original release
- Network: BBC One; BBC One HD
- Release: 7 September – 12 September 2014

The Secrets is a British drama television serial first broadcast on BBC One in 2014. The five-part series, made by Working Title Television, is directed by Dominic Savage. The writers are Elinor Cook, Nick Payne, Ben Ockrent and Sarah Solemani.

Each 30-minute episode begins by revealing a different secret and then exploring the repercussions on the characters involved.

== Production ==
Filming began on 23 January 2014 in London. The producer is Guy Heeley and executive producers are Juliette Howell, Eric Fellner, Tim Bevan and Lucy Richer. The Secrets was commissioned by Danny Cohen and Ben Stephenson.

== Episodes ==
No.	Title	Directed by	Written by	Original release date
1	"The Dilemma"	Dominic Savage	Nick Payne	7 September 2014
A vet has to decide whether or not to euthanase her mother, who has terminal cancer. Starring: Olivia Colman, Alison Steadman and Steve Oram
2	"The Conversation"	Dominic Savage	Sarah Solemani	8 September 2014
On the eve of their wedding, a man tells his fiancée that his previous girlfriend accused him of rape. Starring: Sarah Solemani
3	"The Visitor"	Dominic Savage	Ben Ockrent	9 September 2014
A young man who lives in London with his adoptive family is found by a woman who claims to be the younger biological sister he was unaware of. Saying she has run away from her dysfunctional parents in Southend, she follows him home and wants to move in, but his family is suspicious. Starring: Helen Baxendale, Anthony Flanagan, Anthony Welsh, Charlie Rowe and Paige Meade.
4	"The Lie"	Dominic Savage	Elinor Cook	10 September 2014
By accident, a woman discovers that her husband lives a double life and has a child by another woman. Starring: Joanne Froggatt, Ben Chaplin and Emilia Fox
5	"The Return"	Dominic Savage	Nick Payne	12 September 2014
A policeman is happy when his brother is released from prison, but the brother also loves his wife and trouble ensues. Starring: Ashley Walters, Pippa Bennett-Warner and Tosin Cole
