= 43 Group =

English Anti-Fascist Group

- Formation: April 1946
- Dissolved: 4 June 1950
- Type: Anti-fascism
- Location: London, England, UK

The 43 Group was a British anti-fascist group set up by Jewish ex-servicemen after the Second World War. They did this when, upon returning to London, they encountered British fascist organisations such as Jeffrey Hamm's British League of Ex-Servicemen and later Oswald Mosley's new fascist party, the Union Movement. The activities of these fascist groups included antisemitic speeches in public places, and from the rank-and-file fascists, violent attacks on London Jews and Jewish property. Group members broke up far-right meetings, infiltrated fascist groups, and attacked the fascists in street fighting.

Their newspaper, On Guard, was published from 1947 to 1949.

== Early history and activities ==
The name "43 Group" came from the number of people in the room of Maccabi House (a Jewish sports centre in Hampstead, London) during the group's founding meeting in April 1946. Those who convened the initial meeting included:

- Morris Beckman, served in the Merchant Navy during World War II. He lived through two torpedo attacks during the War.
- Gerald Flamberg, a middleweight boxing champion and member of 156 Battalion. Flamberg won the Military Medal at Arnhem during Operation Market Garden;
- Leonard Sherman, a martial arts expert and member of the Welsh Guards;
- Alec Carson, who flew Hawker Hurricanes in the Battle of Britain.

The organisation had two aims: to prevent fascist activities by physical force if necessary, and to pressure Parliament into making racial incitement a criminal offence.

The 17-year-old Vidal Sassoon joined the group and later joined the Israeli Defence Forces to fight in the 1948 Arab–Israeli War. Sassoon later founded a multinational hair styling business.

The initial membership was around 300 people. The group grew to include many hundreds of men and women, not all Jewish. Many among them had been decorated for bravery, including the VC (Petty Officer Tommy Gould), DSO, DFC, DSM, and MM. The organisation was sometimes portrayed by its enemies as a front for either Jewish terrorists or communists, but in fact it was mostly composed of British ex-servicemen.

The group published On Guard, from July 1947 to December 1949, an anti-fascist paper which often published intelligence gathered by Group spies. As well as covering the activities of Oswald Mosley and the British fascists, On Guard reported on the activities of fascists all around the world and racist injustices in countries including the USA and South Africa.

== Relationship with other organisations ==
The 43 Group was viewed by established Jewish organisations, such as the Board of Deputies of British Jews, as counterproductive. The Board of Deputies of British Jews worried that the 43 Group's activities could damage the Jewish community's reputation, especially in light of the terrorist acts and guerrilla warfare carried out by militant Zionist groups such as the Irgun in British Mandate Palestine. However it also had prominent supporters, both political and social. Left-wing Labour MPs such as D. N. Pritt, John Platt-Mills, and Woodrow Wyatt were keen supporters, while entertainment giants Jack Solomon and Bud Flanagan regularly donated significant sums to the organisation.

However, the 43 Group never sought to replace the more traditional groups who preferred debate and discussion, but who had failed to stop the BUF, partly due to the non-cooperation of the then Home Secretary, James Chuter Ede. Rather, 43 Group sought to prevent the Union Movement mobilising and gathering support, remembering that the Nazi Party had gained prominence in a similar fashion as the Brownshirts on the streets of post-World War I Germany.

== Dissolution and impact ==
The 43 Group was voluntarily disbanded on 4 June 1950, as various Jewish organizations and influential individuals members considered that the immediate threat had passed. Although Mosley's Union Movement remained active throughout the 1950s, it was not until 1962, when Colin Jordan and his National Socialist Movement unfurled an enormous banner in Trafalgar Square bearing the words "Free Britain from Jewish Control" that former 43 group members formed the 62 Group in the former group's image and British fascists again encountered any significant privately organised street-level resistance.

The overall effect of 43 Group is unclear. Morris Beckman argued that it was crucial in stopping a resurgence of fascism in post-war Britain. The 43 group was undoubtedly an inspiration to other militant anti-fascist groups such as the 62 Group and Anti-Fascist Action.

== Legacy ==
In 2004, the group was the subject of BBC Radio 4 programme A Rage in Dalston, part of The Archive Hour series.

In September 2015, it was announced that BBC2 and NBC were co-developing a six-part drama series alongside surviving members of The 43 Group and produced by The Tenafly Film Company and Tiger Aspect Drama, but the series was not made.

== Historical Marker ==
Placed by the Jewish American Society for Historic Preservation, U.K. Branch, organised by Martin Sugarman, financed by Jerry Klinger (JASHP), and the Association of Jewish Ex-Servicemen and Women, at the site of the 43 Group Headquarters. The marker is located about 1/4 mile from Trafalgar Square in London.

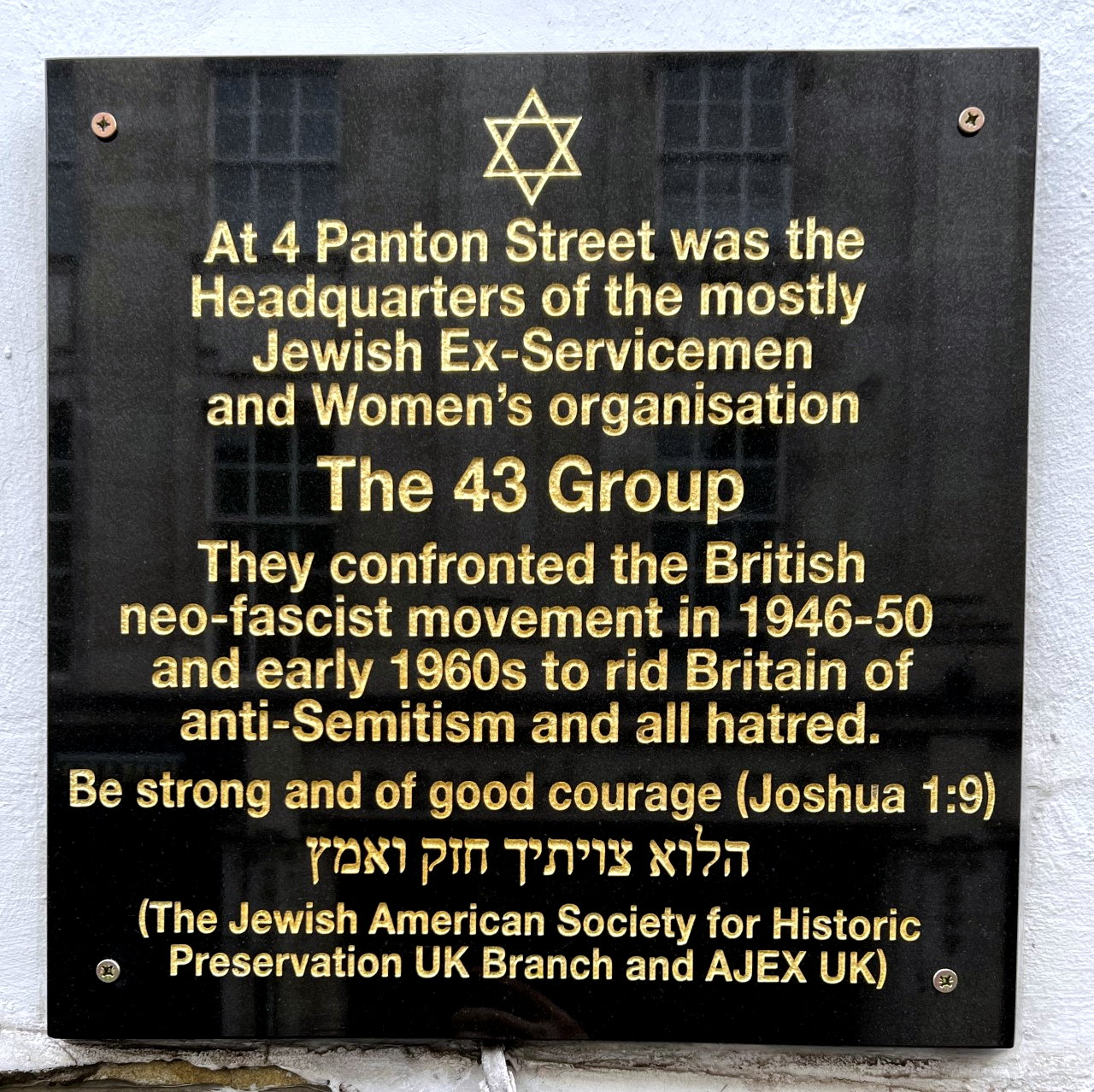
British Post-WW2 Jewish antifascist fighters

"At 4 Panton Street was the Headquarters of the mostly Jewish ex-servicemen and Women's organization. The 43 Group They confronted the British Neo-fascist movement in 1946-50 and early 1960s to rid Britain of Antisemitism and all hatred. Be strong and of good courage (Joshua 1:9) Hebrew (The Jewish American Society for Historic Preservation U.K. Branch and AJEX UK)"

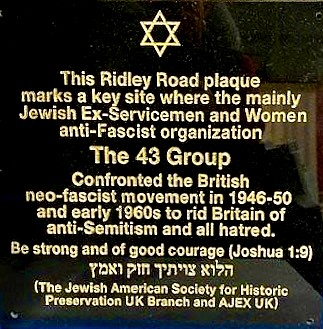
Ridley Rd 2

December, 2023, the Jewish American Society for Historic Preservation, U.K. Branch, together with the Association of Jewish Ex-Servicemen and Women, organised by Martin Sugarman, placed the Ridley Rd. Marker. The Ridley Rd. area was the key area where the hatred, bigotry and racism of the British Neo-Nazi/Fascist movement was confronted by the 43 Group.

The Text reads:

"This Ridley Road plaque marks a key site where the mainly Jewish Ex-Servicemen and Women anti-Fascist organization 'The 43 Group' Confronted the British Neo-Fascist movement in 1946-50 and early 1960s to rid Britain of antisemitism and all hatred."

"Be Strong and of Good Courage (Joshua 1:9) (The Jewish American Society for Historic Preservation UK Branch and AJEX UK)

== See also ==
- Anti-fascism
- 62 Group
