= 62 Group =

British anti-fascist organization

- Predecessor: 43 Group, Yellow Star Movement
- Formation: 1962
- Dissolved: 1975
- Type: Militant anti-fascism
- Location: London, England, UK
- Leader: Harry Bidney
- Affiliations: Jewish Aid Committee of Britain (JACOB)
- Formerly called: 62 Committee

The 62 Group, originally the 62 Committee, was a militant broad-based coalition of anti-fascists in London, headed by Harry Bidney. Based on the earlier 43 Group, it was formed in 1962 largely in response to the resurgence of fascism in Britain at the time, and particularly Colin Jordan's National Socialist Movement (NSM). It used violence against the remnants of Oswald Mosley's Union Movement, the original British National Party, and the emerging National Front, as well as the NSM. The group was financed in part by the Jewish Aid Committee of Britain (JACOB).

== Membership ==
The Group was modelled after the earlier 43 Group, to which Bidney and other leadership had also belonged. Another predecessor to the Group from which it drew its early membership was the Yellow Star Movement, founded in 1962 by the Reverend Bill Sargent and Harry Green, a member of AJEX. Though the YSM was decentralised, its supporters had experienced a split concerning whether the organisation should engage in violence. The more militant faction of the YSM were among the founders of the 62 Group.

Formal membership was only open to those who were Jewish, but the Group worked with people from other anti-fascist organisations and immigrant communities, including Irish and Black-power activists.

The Group was led by Harry Bidney, owner of Soho night club, The Limbo. It was managed day-to-day by hardman Paul Nathan who was "the toughest Jew around in those days, unlike the soft ones walking around today". Another significant member was Gerry Gable, an intelligence officer for the 62 Group, who later founded the magazine Searchlight.

== Activities ==
The Group's tactics consisted of direct action against those groups it believed were organising violence against minority groups, which sometimes resulted in violent confrontations. On one occasion in July 1962 this led to a riot in London's Trafalgar Square, when Colin Jordan tried to address a crowd while standing in front of a large banner which read: "Free Britain from Jewish Control". It also used intelligence, including informers within the fascist groups.

The Group frequently disrupted the meetings of Oswald Mosley's Union Movement, and this was a contributing factor to the Union Movement's demise. Commenting on the activities of the 62 Group, the Board of Deputies of British Jews disapprovingly said that, "some of these anti-fascists are Jews who act as if throwing tomatoes at a British racialist speaker is somehow getting their own back on Hitler."

The organisation attempted to expose connections between far-right groups in Britain and former members of the original Nazi Party. Two veterans of the 62 Group stated that they had encountered former members of the Schutzstaffel (SS) at a meeting held by the neo-Nazi Northern League in Brighton.

In 1975, the 62 Group dissolved. Some former members of the Group formed the Community Security Trust.

== Ridley Road ==
Author Jo Bloom researched the events and wrote a novel, Ridley Road, published in 2014, with the 62 Group and events in the summer of 1962 as a backdrop, named after a street in the East End of London known as a fascist meeting place, around which battles took place. A television drama of the same name based on the book, written and adapted for television by Sarah Solemani, was announced in 2019 and broadcast by BBC One in October 2021.

== See also ==
- Anti-fascism
