= Peter Scawen Watkinson Roberts =

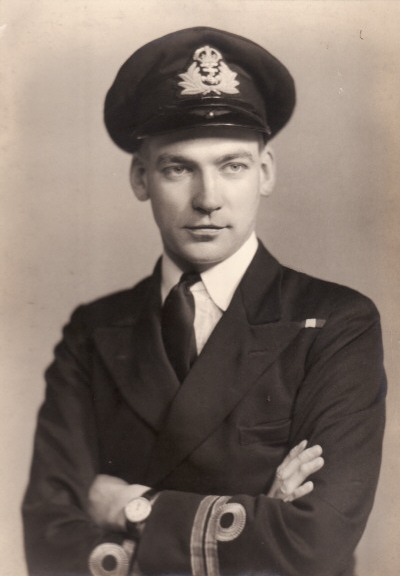
- Born: 28 July 1917; Chesham Bois, Buckinghamshire, England
- Died: 8 December 1979 (aged 62); Newton Ferrers, Devon, England
- Military career
- Allegiance: United Kingdom
- Branch: Royal Navy
- Service years: 1936–1962
- Rank: Lieutenant Commander
- Commands: HMS Thrasher (1941–42)
- Conflicts: Second World War; Korean War
- Awards: Victoria Cross; Distinguished Service Cross

Peter Scawen Watkinson Roberts, VC, DSC (28 July 1917 – 8 December 1979) was a Royal Navy officer and a recipient of the Victoria Cross, the highest award for gallantry in the face of the enemy that can be awarded to British and Commonwealth forces.

== Details ==
Roberts was 24 years old, and a lieutenant in the Royal Navy during the Second World War, when the following deed took place for which he was awarded the Victoria Cross.

On 16 February 1942 north of Crete, in the Mediterranean, HM Submarine Thrasher, after attacking and sinking a supply ship, was itself attacked. Thrasher was subjected to a three-hour depth charge attack and aerial bombing.

Later, after surfacing, two unexploded bombs were discovered in the gun-casing. Lieutenant Roberts and a petty officer (Thomas William Gould) removed the first one without too much difficulty, but the second bomb had penetrated the side plating of the gun emplacement, and then the deck casing above the pressure hull. Roberts and Gould entered the confined space (which was no more than 2 ft high in places), and lying flat, wormed past deck supports, battery ventilators, and drop bollards. The petty officer then lay on his back with the 100 lb bomb in his arms while the lieutenant dragged him along by the shoulders. Meanwhile, Thrasher was surfaced, stationary, and close inshore to enemy waters. If the submarine was forced to crash dive, both men would drown. It was 40 minutes before they got the bomb clear, wrapped it in sacking, and dropped it over the side.

Roberts' VC is on display in the Lord Ashcroft Gallery at the Imperial War Museum, London.

The award of the two new VCs was announced by the BBC on 11 June 1942.

Removing unexploded bombs from gun casing of HM Submarine Thrasher on 16 February 1942. BBC Sound Archive recording from 11 June 1942.
