= Ridley Road (TV series) =

2021 British TV series

- Genre: Period drama
- Based on: Ridley Road by Jo Bloom
- Written by: Sarah Solemani
- Directed by: Lisa Mulcahy
- Starring: Agnes O'Casey; Rory Kinnear; Eddie Marsan; Tom Varey; Will Keen; Samantha Spiro; Rita Tushingham; Tamzin Outhwaite; Tracy-Ann Oberman
- Country of origin: United Kingdom
- Original language: English
- No. of seasons: 1
- No. of episodes: 4

Production
- Executive producer: Nicola Shindler
- Running time: 57 minutes
- Production company: Red Production Company

Original release
- Network: BBC One
- Release: 3 October – 24 October 2021

Ridley Road is a British four-part television drama series which premiered on BBC One on 3 October 2021, about Jewish opposition to British Fascism in the 1960s. It was adapted by Sarah Solemani from Jo Bloom's 2014 novel of the same name. The series is directed by Lisa Mulcahy and the executive producer is Nicola Shindler.

== Plot summary ==
Vivien Epstein is the daughter in a traditional suburban 1960s Manchester Jewish family, comprising father David, mother Liza and a relative Roza whom the family is sheltering. The father arranges a marriage (with neither Vivien's desire nor her consent) with the father of a local Jewish boy. Vivien already has a beau, Jack, who leaves for London, desolate.

Vivien has no intention of becoming a bride. She leaves to find some Jewish relatives in London, rents a room with non-Jewish East End resident Nettie Jones, and gets a job as a hairdresser in Soho. Far-right fascism is on the rise. One of her East End relatives, Soly Malinovsky, is a London black cab driver who heads a Jewish anti-fascist group. He asks Vivien to get involved ("anti-fascists do, they don't just say"). She agrees to infiltrate the organisation of Colin Jordan, the neo-Nazi leader of the East End thugs. Jordan's organisation (where Jack is already undercover) is based in the country mansion of a far-right English aristocrat.

Vivien affects a relationship with Jordan and his young son, and she allows Jordan to seduce her. However, both Vivien and Jack have their cover blown and are both in danger of being killed, but they each separately manage hair-raising escapes, Vivien taking a suitcase of incriminating documents that prove that Jordan has set up an illegal training camp for a neo-Nazi militia. (The police agree to investigate and prosecute Jordan.) Vivien's parents, who were devastated at her abandonment of the family home and the arranged betrothal, are now very proud of her anti-fascist work. After a tearful family reunion, Vivien flies off to Tel Aviv with Jack.

== Cast ==
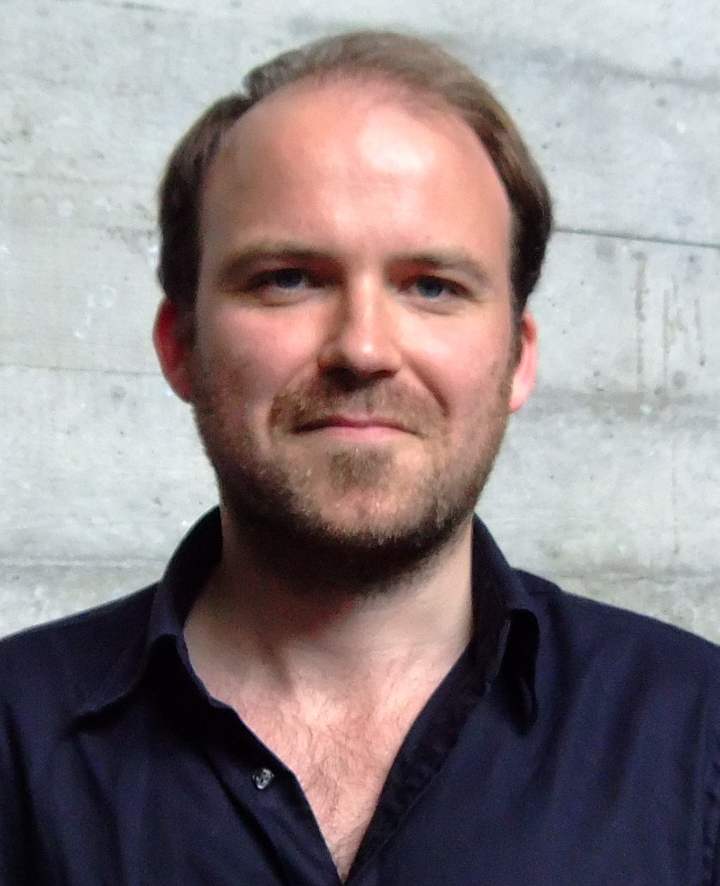
Rory Kinnear plays British neo-Nazi Colin Jordan

- Agnes O'Casey as Vivien Epstein
- Tom Varey as Jack Morris
- Rory Kinnear as Colin Jordan, leader of the British Movement
- Romane Portail as Jordan's wife, Françoise Dior
- Eddie Marsan as Soly Malinovsky, Vivien's uncle
- Tracy-Ann Oberman as his wife, Nancy Malinovsky
- Danny Sykes as their son, Ronnie Malinovsky
- Samantha Spiro as Vivien's mother, Liza Epstein
- Will Keen as Vivien's father, David Epstein
- Julia Krynke as Roza, a relative of the Epsteins
- Tamzin Outhwaite as Barbara, who manages the hairdressing salon in Soho that Vivien works at
- Gabriel Akuwudike as Barbara's son, Stevie
- Rita Tushingham as Nettie Jones, Vivien's landlady
- Allan Corduner as Rabbi Lehrer
- Nigel Betts as Mr Gary Burns
- Hannah Traylen as Chrissy
- Danny Hatchard as Lee
- Hannah Onslow as Elise
- Stephen Hogan as American Nazi leader George Lincoln Rockwell

== Production ==
The series was filmed in Ashton under Lyne, Bolton, Manchester and Liverpool and at Broughton Hall near Skipton, North Yorkshire.

== Episodes ==
No. in series	Title	Directed by	Written by	Original release date	UK viewers (millions)
1	"Episode 1"	Lisa Mulcahy	Sarah Solemani	3 October 2021	6.11
2	"Episode 2"	Lisa Mulcahy	Sarah Solemani	10 October 2021	4.80
3	"Episode 3"	Lisa Mulcahy	Sarah Solemani	17 October 2021	4.40
4	"Episode 4"	Lisa Mulcahy	Sarah Solemani	24 October 2021	3.60

== Reception ==
Gillean Craig, for the Church Times, was unimpressed, saying: "The plot is paper-thin, and the pile-up of improbabilities is too great. This is a lost opportunity: the theme deserves a far more rigorous head as well as heart."

Lucy Mangan, in a three-starred review for The Guardian, said: "The direction feels strangely stilted and the dialogue flimsy, the script never quite first-class. The parts set in the hairdresser’s where Vivien gets a job are almost cartoonish, and the relentless salt-of-the-earthiness of everyone born in the East End becomes quite grating. Still, even if you might wish it exhibited a bit more complexity and artistic refinement, it is a drama with resonance. It has the right story to tell – alas – in our current dark age.

Carol Midgley, for The Times, gave it four stars, saying "What makes Ridley Road a joy to watch is not only the stellar cast, but the storytelling... It is beautifully crafted, weaving in archive footage, making it look as if Vivien is actually in Sixties London."

Reviewing Ridley Road for The Independent, Ed Cumming said: "By setting a made-up story within accurate historical context, Solemani gives herself plenty of freedom, and takes advantage of the licence. Ridley Road is an action thriller as well as a period piece, with chases, fights and romance to go with its political context... The contemporary parallels are so near to the surface that there’s no need to lay them on too thickly. Instead, Ridley Road shows that extremism needn’t arise out of extraordinary situations. It emerges from everyday life."
