= The Blackshirt =

British political newspaper associated with fascism

The Blackshirt was the official newspaper of Oswald Mosley's British Union of Fascists (BUF) from 1933 until 1936. After the launch of Action in 1936, The Blackshirt declined in importance. An attempt was made to reorganise it as a regional paper in "Southern" (the Midlands, Wales, the West, and South West and the East), "East London" (Greater London) and "Northern" (the North West, Yorkshire, the North East and Scotland) editions. From June 1939 it became the British Union News. Due to the outbreak of war the BUF decided to concentrate all its journalistic resources on Action and Blackshirt ceased publication. The paper also incorporated the short-lived The Fascist Week (1933–34).

Issue of the paper recording a speech by Oswald Mosley at the Royal Albert Hall in 1934
