= British League of Ex-Servicemen and Women =

British ex-service organisation

The British League of Ex-Servicemen and Women (BLESMAW) was a British ex-service organisation that became associated with far-right politics both during and after the Second World War.

== Origins ==
The group had its origins in 1937, when James Taylor set up the group as an alternative to the Royal British Legion. Its main area of concern was the right for military veterans to receive a good pension.

== Fascism ==
By 1944 Jeffrey Hamm and Victor Burgess, both members of the British Union of Fascists who had been interned under Defence Regulation 18B, had taken control of the group. The League held its first meeting in Hyde Park on 4 November 1944 at which it promoted itself as a fascist organisation that endorsed racial purity and "Britain for the British", which inspired a hostile reaction from the crowd. Under Hamm and Burgess, the group became active in East London, where it was involved in street violence.

In June 1945 the League was represented at a meeting of the National Front After Victory, an initiative led by A. K. Chesterton aimed at forming a united postwar party although the group quickly floundered. By 1946, Hamm was in full control and had expelled Propaganda Director Burgess, whom he viewed as a rival for the leadership, as well as John Marston Gaster, the League's public relations officer, whose public displays of Nazism were proving an embarrassment and damaged the League's chances of gaining a following.

Nonetheless, the League, along with other more minor fascist groups in Britain at the time, worked closely with German prisoners-of-war held in camps in and around London.

== Antisemitism ==
The group was noted for its virulent antisemitism, although immediately after the war, the group's decision to continue espousing such views was publicly criticised by Oswald Mosley. As a result of the group's antisemitism, it came into regular conflict with the militant anti-fascist 43 Group although individual members of the 43 Group such as James Cotter also managed to infiltrate the League. Ultimately the 43 Group proved successful in forcing the League to abandon many of its street parades. However, the League also won support due to antisemitism in the United Kingdom becoming widespread around 1947 in response to the Jewish insurgency in Mandatory Palestine against British rule. Such a growth in antisemitism not only boosted the league but also gave renewed impetus for a refoundation of a wider fascist movement in the UK.

== Union Movement ==
On 15 November 1947 a meeting was held at the Memorial Hall, in London's Farringdon Road, where Mosley announced his intention to return to politics. Four main movements were represented at the gathering: Anthony Gannon's Imperial Defence League, Burgess's Union of British Freedom, Horace Gowing's Sons of St George and the League itself.

Hamm and the League reacted favourably to that development although some, such as the former BUF member Robert Saunders, of the Rural Reconstruction Association, were less than enthusiastic about admitting BLESMAW since they represented the brawling, vulgar, antisemitic tendency of the BUF that should be kept out of any new movement. Nevertheless, BLESMAW was one of the constituent groups of the Union Movement upon its foundation in 1948, which marked the end of the organisation.
