= Ridley Road (novel) =

2014 novel by Jo Bloom

- First edition (publ. W&N)
- Author: Jo Bloom
- Language: English
- Publication date: 2014

Ridley Road is a 2014 novel by Jo Bloom, in which the 62 Group and opposition to 1960s British neo-Nazis such as Colin Jordan are a backdrop to the narrative. Ridley Road in Dalston in London's East End was well known as a fascist meeting place in the 1960s, around which battles took place.

It was adapted by Sarah Solemani as Ridley Road, a four-part drama by BBC One, which was premiered on 3 October 2021.
