= National Party of Europe =

Former far-right European political initiative

The "Flash and Circle" symbol of the Union Movement was chosen as the emblem of the new group.

The National Party of Europe (NPE) was an initiative undertaken by a number of far-right political parties in Europe during the 1960s to help increase cross-border co-operation and work towards European unity. Under the direction of Sir Oswald Mosley, a pre-war British fascist leader who returned to politics after the Second World War, the group aimed to bring together and merge a number of far-right groups from across the continent, all of which shared at least some commitment to a wider pan-European nationalism. The group failed to achieve its aims as most of its member groups preferred to maintain their independence.

== History ==
The idea of an NPE began when Oswald Mosley launched his Europe a Nation campaign after World War II at a time when contemporaries such as Jean-François Thiriart were also becoming interested in Europeanism. Attempts soon followed to co-ordinate this growth in pan-European nationalism, although the European Social Movement and the New European Order were loose networks and a more concrete alliance was called for. The idea came to fruition at the Conference of Venice in 1962 when the leaders of the Union Movement, the Deutsche Reichspartei, the Italian Social Movement, Jeune Europe and the Mouvement d'Action Civique came together to form this group. The European Declaration at Venice was released on 1 March 1962 and contained the following ten aims:

- The creation of Europe a Nation through a common European government.
- The creation of an elected European parliament.
- The continuation of national parliaments with their authority limited to social and cultural matters.
- Economics to be driven by the wage-price mechanism to ensure fair wages and economic growth.
- The creation of an economic alternative to capitalism and communism.
- More worker control and less bureaucracy in nationalized industries.
- The withdrawal of American and Soviet forces from Europe.
- An end to the role of the United Nations with the US, USSR and Europe acting as three equals.
- Decolonization with a move to set up single-ethnic governments in former colonies.
- Europe to be defined as mainland territory outside of the USSR, the United Kingdom, overseas territories and around one-third of Africa.

The conference also decided that each member party should seek to change its name to NPE or the local equivalent, that the motto of the new group should be 'Progress - Solidarity - Unity' and that the Flash and Circle should serve as the emblem of the movement.

Despite the high ambitions, the idea did not come to much. Both the Italian Social Movement and the National Democratic Party of Germany, successor to the Deutsche Reichspartei, refused to change their name and only set up a permanent liaison office. Meanwhile, Thiriart moved increasingly away from the NPE and towards national communism. As well as this, many of the leading neo-fascist groups in Europe took no part in the NPE. Mosley meanwhile had little day-to-day contact with the Union Movement from his base in France and he retired from politics altogether after his poor showing in Shoreditch and Finsbury at the 1966 general election, effectively drawing the curtain on the NPE.

A group called European Action continued to agitate for the aims of the NPE until the 2010s through its newspaper of the same name, edited by Robert Edwards, although it was an almost exclusively British movement.

== Members ==
Country	Party	Leader	National MPs
Belgium	Civic Action Movement; Mouvement d'Action Civique	Jean-François Thiriart	0 / 212
West Germany	German Reich Party; Deutsche Reichspartei	Alexander Andrae	0 / 521
Italy	Italian Social Movement; Movimento Sociale Italiano	Augusto De Marsanich	32 / 574
United Kingdom	Union Movement	Sir Oswald Mosley	0 / 650
