= Thomas William Gould =

Recipient of the Victoria Cross (1914–2001)

- Born: 28 December 1914; Dover, Kent
- Died: 6 December 2001 (aged 86); Peterborough, Cambridgeshire
- Military career
- Allegiance: United Kingdom
- Branch: Royal Navy
- Service years: 1933–1945
- Rank: Petty Officer
- Unit: HMS Thrasher
- Conflicts: Second World War
- Awards: Victoria Cross; Mentioned in Despatches

Thomas William Gould, VC (28 December 1914 – 6 December 2001) was a Royal Navy sailor and a recipient of the Victoria Cross, the highest award for gallantry in the face of the enemy that can be awarded to British and Commonwealth forces. He was one of three Jewish recipients of the Victoria Cross in the Second World War. He was awarded the VC for his actions on 16 February 1942, when he and Lieutenant Peter Scawen Watkinson Roberts removed two unexploded bombs from the gun-casing of HM Submarine Thrasher. After the war, he was one of the founders of the 43 Group, a group of Jewish ex-servicemen who fought the Fascists.

== Second World War ==
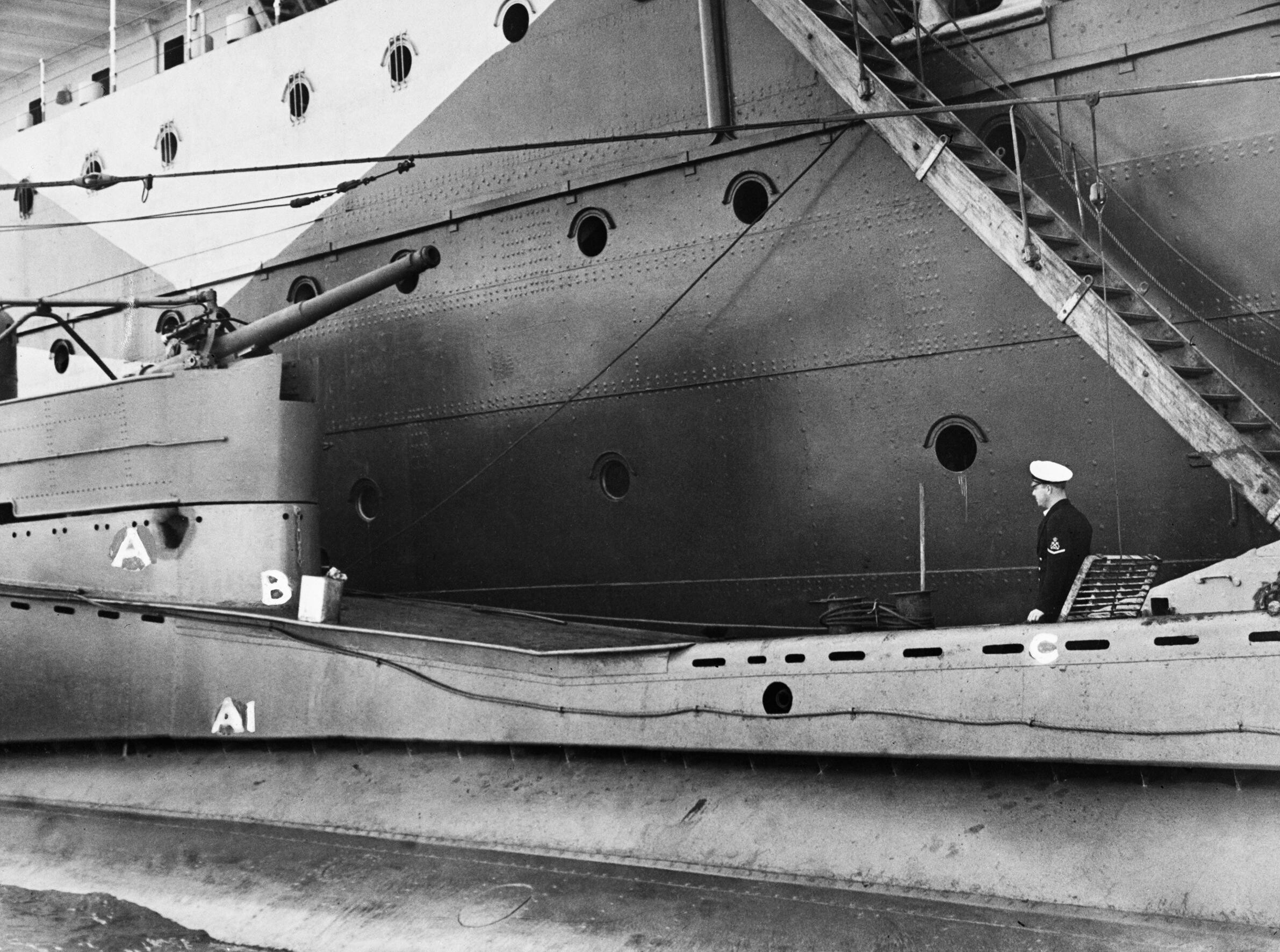
Damage to the casing of HMS Thrasher after two bombs struck her off Crete on the night of 15/16 February 1942. A – where bomb penetrated the gun platform. A1 – the position where the bomb was discovered inside the casing. B – Position where the second unexploded bomb was discovered lying on the casing; the bomb is represented by the tin can. C – Gould stands in the casing-hatch through which bomb from A1 was dragged.

Gould was 27 years old, and a petty officer in the Royal Navy during the Second World War, when the following deed took place for which he was awarded the Victoria Cross.

On 16 February 1942 north of Crete, in the Mediterranean, HM Submarine Thrasher, after attacking and sinking a supply ship, was itself attacked. Thrasher was subjected to a three-hour depth charge attack and aerial bombing.

When after dark the submarine surfaced, two unexploded bombs were discovered in the gun-casing. Petty Officer Gould and Lieutenant Peter Scawen Watkinson Roberts volunteered to remove the bombs, which were of a type unknown to them. They removed the first one without too much difficulty, but the second bomb had penetrated the side plating of the gun emplacement, and then the deck casing above the pressure hull.

Roberts and Gould entered the confined space (which was no more than 2 feet (61 cm) high in places), and lying flat, wormed past deck supports, battery ventilators, and drop bollards. The petty officer then lay on his back with the 150 lb bomb in his arms while the lieutenant dragged him along by the shoulders. "It was then a matter of the two of us, lying horizontally, pushing and pulling the bomb back through the casing. It was pitch black and the bomb was making this horrible ticking noise while the submarine was being buffeted by the waves". They pushed and dragged the bomb for a distance of some 20 feet (6.1 m) until it could be lowered over the side. Every time the bomb was moved there was a loud twanging noise as of a broken spring which added nothing to their peace of mind. Thrasher was surfaced, stationary, and close inshore to enemy waters. If the submarine was forced to crash dive while they were in the casing, they must have been drowned. It was 50 minutes before they got the bomb clear, wrapped it in sacking, and dropped it over the side.

In August 1943 Gould received a Mention in Despatches after the submarine Truculent sank U-308 off the Faroes on 4 June 1943.

== Later life ==
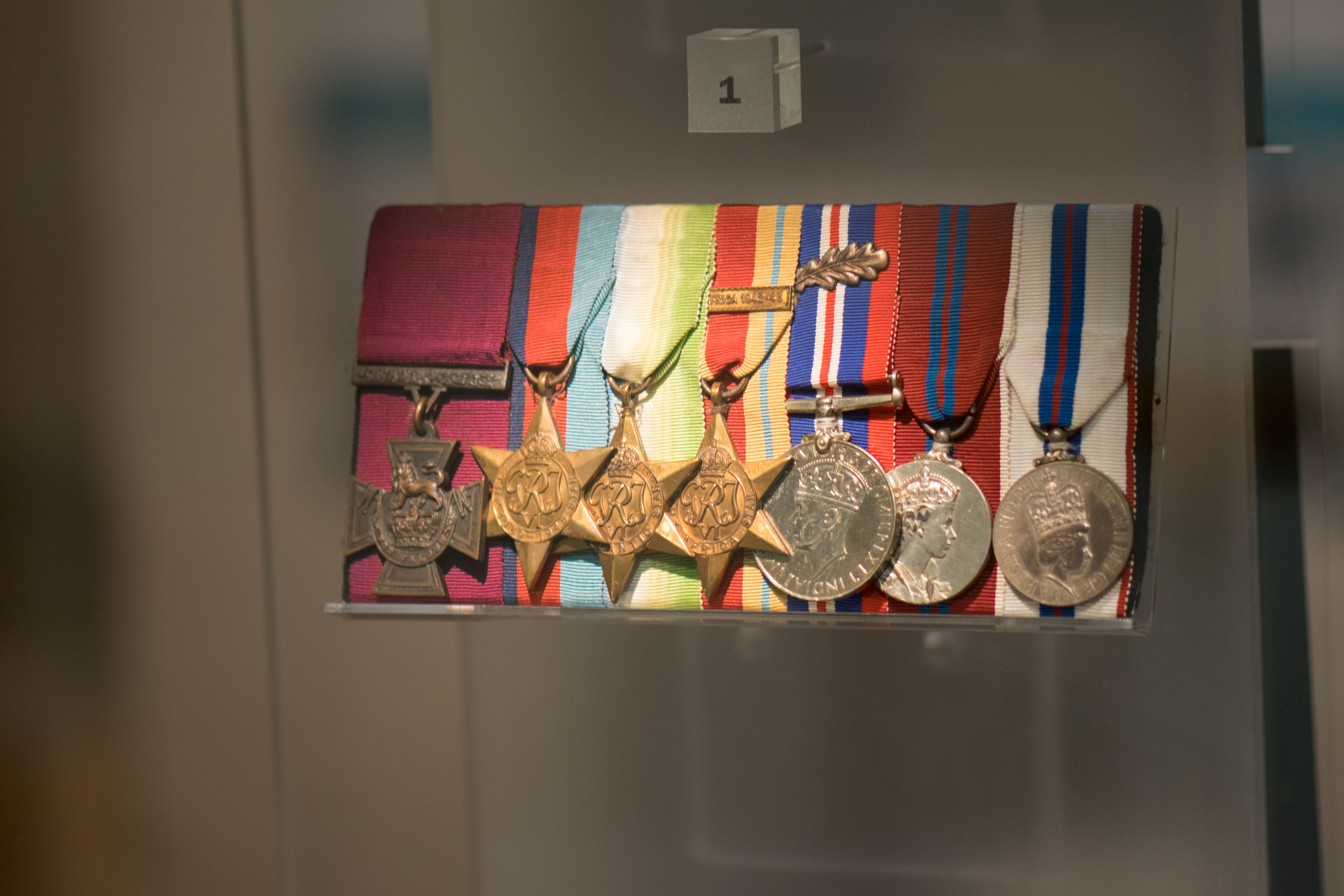
Medals of Gould displayed in the Jewish Museum London (Victoria Cross left)

Tommy Gould went on to become one of the founders of the 43 Group, a group of Jewish ex-servicemen who fought the Fascists after the Second World War.

His VC was sold at Sotheby's for £44,000 in October 1987. His medals are held by the Association of Jewish Ex-Servicemen and Women, in the Jewish Museum London in Camden.

== Bibliography ==
- Ingleton, Roy (2011). Kent VCs. Pen and Sword Books. ISBN 978-1848844094.
