= Sarah Solemani =

English actress and writer

- Born: 4 September 1982 (age 44); Camden, London, England
- Occupations: Actress, writer, playwright
- Years active: 2000–present
- Spouse: Daniel E. Ingram (m. 2012)
- Children: 2

Sarah Solemani (born 4 September 1982) is an English actress, writer and activist. She is best known for her role as Becky in the BAFTA winning sitcom Him & Her and playing Renee Zellweger's best friend Miranda in Bridget Jones's Baby, for which she was nominated for an Evening Standard Best Actress Award. She also had roles in the British comedy TV series Bad Education and The Wrong Mans. The British television series The Party, adapted by Solemani from the novel by Elizabeth Day as well as featuring her as a main protagonist, was released on ITVX on 11 October 2026.

== Early life ==
Solemani was born in the London Borough of Camden and grew up in Crouch End. Her father, Akiva, is a retired mathematics lecturer of Iranian Jewish origins. Her mother, Rachel, died from cancer when Sarah was 16. After passing her A levels at the Henrietta Barnett School, she took a gap year before reading Social and Political Sciences (now the Human, Social and Political Sciences Tripos) at New Hall, Cambridge and graduating MA (Cantab). At Cambridge, she joined the Footlights performance troupe, becoming social secretary during her first year and later vice president.

== Career ==
=== Theatre ===
Solemani was a member of the National Youth Theatre during her gap year, during which time she appeared as Elaine in the West End theatre production of The Graduate and as Ayesha in the critically acclaimed National Theatre production of Sanctuary.

She was a member of the Young Writer's Group attached to the Royal Court Theatre, and a writer at the Young Vic Theatre. Two plays she wrote were produced at Soho Theatre. Another of her works, The Cost of Things (2010), was presented at the Public Theater New York under the aegis of the Old Vic Theatre as part of the TS Eliot Project. In 2011, she wrote The Baron which received the Old Vic New Voices 'Ignite' award.

In 2009, Solemani appeared in Simon Stephens' play Pornography at the Tricycle Theatre in London and, in 2012, as Maryam in The House of Bernarda Alba at the Almeida Theatre. She wrote Up the Royal Borough, part of an evening of plays in response to Owen Jones' Chavs at the Lyric Hammersmith. It gained good reviews.

=== Television and film ===
Solemani's first film role was as a tableaux girl in Mrs Henderson Presents, which she performed during her third year of college. Her first major TV role was as Becky in BBC Three sitcom Him & Her, which was first broadcast in September 2010, and ran for four series, before ending in 2013.

From 2012 until 2014, Solemani starred as Rosie Gulliver in the BBC Three comedy, Bad Education, including its spin off movie The Bad Education Movie and a one-off special in 2022. In 2013, she featured in the BBC and Hulu's The Wrong Mans alongside James Corden. She reprised the role for the show's second series. She wrote and starred in an episode of the Sky TV series Love Matters, titled "Aphrodite Fry", that aired in 2013. In 2014, she wrote the television film The Secrets. It aired on BBC One to critical acclaim.

In Hollywood, Solemani was chosen by Bill Hader and Alec Berg to be part of their writing team on Hader's new HBO show Barry. While working in the United States, she has found the American television industry has a more positive attitude towards commissioning work by women and featuring female characters in their series.

In 2019, it was announced she would adapt Jo Bloom's novel Ridley Road into a television drama. Published in 2014, Bloom's book was the result of research into the anti-Nazi London 62 Group and events involving it in the summer of 1962, with the group's activities serving as a backdrop, the title coming from the street in the East End where fascists held meetings and around which battles took place. It was broadcast by BBC One in October 2021. In 2022, she co-wrote and co-starred with Steve Coogan in Chivalry, a six episode comedy-drama about "sexual politics in the wake of the #MeToo movement" for Channel 4.

=== Print ===
Solemani has contributed to the New Statesman, The Guardian, The Independent and Harper's Bazaar. She writes regularly for the publications Red and Glamour.

== Awards and acclaim ==
Solemani was awarded third place in the Barry Amiel and Norman Melburn Trust/New Statesman Prize for New Political Writing on the subject: "Do women's rights remain the privilege of the developed world?" in 2005.

In 2011, Solemani won the Royal Television Society award for best Comedy Performance for her role in Him & Her along with her co-star Russell Tovey. In 2012, Solemani was named one of the year's Broadcast Hot Shots.

== Activism ==
Solemani is against the criminalisation of sex work, and has been a champion for sex workers' rights since 2002. She was nominated by the English Collective of Prostitutes (ECP) to represent them in Parliament in order to halt further efforts to criminalise clients. She was an active supporter of former shadow Home Secretary Yvette Cooper in the 2015 Labour leadership contest. She has introduced Cooper at various Labour Party events and has contributed to her speeches.

== Personal life ==
Solemani married Daniel E. Ingram, a sustainable investment expert specialising in climate change, in Petah Tikva, Israel, on 3 June 2012. Their daughter was born in December 2013 and their son was born in May 2018. Raised by an Orthodox Jewish father and a Plymouth Brethren evangelical mother, Solemani has formally converted to Judaism along with her husband.

== Filmography ==
=== Film and television ===
| Year | Title | Role | Notes |
|---|---|---|---|
| 2003 | Red Cap | Gillian Jennings | TV series |
| 2005 | Mrs Henderson Presents | Vera | Film |
| 2006 | Undone | Edna | Radio series |
| 2006 | Hyperdrive | Alien 1 | TV series |
| 2007 | Living with Two People You Like Individually... But Not as a Couple | Antonia | TV series – pilot |
| 2007 | Roman's Empire | Jenny | TV series |
| 2007 | Suburban Shootout | Donna | TV series |
| 2010–2013 | Him & Her | Becky | TV series |
| 2011 | Silent Witness | Mary Olivant | TV series – episode 109 ("The Prodigal") |
| 2011 | Psychoville | Emily | TV series |
| 2011 | Coma Girl | Siobhan | TV series – pilot |
| 2011 | Uptown Downstairs Abbey | Lady Mary | TV series – special for Comic Relief |
| 2012 | The Borgias | Magdelena | TV series |
| 2012 | Skins | Celia Champion | TV series |
| 2012–2014, 2022 | Bad Education | Miss Gulliver | TV series |
| 2013 | Love Matters | Aphrodite Fry | TV series – also writer ("Aphrodite Fry"); |
| 2013–14 | The Wrong Mans | Lizzie Green | TV series |
| 2013 | Crackanory | Narrator | TV series |
| 2014 | The Secrets | Charlotte | TV series; also writer |
| 2015 | The Bad Education Movie | Miss Gulliver | Film |
| 2015 | Hector | Sara | Film |
| 2016 | The Five | Pru Carew | TV series |
| 2016 | Bridget Jones's Baby | Miranda | Film |
| 2017 | No Offence | DCI Christine Lickberg | TV series |
| 2017 | The Pact | Amy | TV pilot |
| 2018 | Barry | | TV series - writer |
| 2018 | Wild Honey Pie! | Rachel Griffiths | Film |
| 2019 | How to Build a Girl | Angie | Film |
| 2019 | Greed | Melanie | Film |
| 2019 | Urban Myths | | TV series - writer |
| 2020 | Inside No 9 | Emily | TV series - episode "Death Be Not Proud" |
| 2021 | Ridley Road | | TV series - writer |
| 2021 | Made for Love | | TV series - writer |
| 2022 | Chivalry | Bobby | TV series: also co-creator and co-writer |
| 2025 | Bridget Jones: Mad About the Boy | Miranda | Film |
| 2025 | The Party | Lucy Gilmour | TV series: also writer |

=== Stage ===
| Year | Title | Role | Notes |
|---|---|---|---|
| 2000 | The Graduate | Elaine | Gielgud Theatre |
| 2007 | Burning Cars | | Hampstead Theatre |
| 2009 | Pornography | | Tricycle Theatre |
| 2012 | The House of Bernarda Alba | Maryam | Almeida Theatre |

== See also ==
- List of Iranian actresses
