= HMS Thrasher (N37) =

Submarine of the Royal Navy

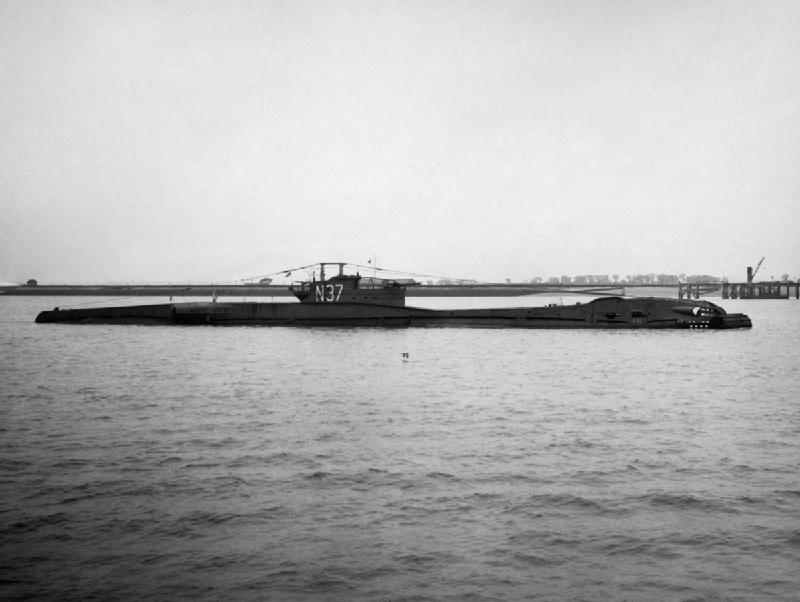
- HMS Thrasher underway

History

United Kingdom
- Builder: Cammell Laird & Co Limited, Birkenhead
- Laid down: 14 November 1939
- Launched: 28 November 1940
- Commissioned: 14 May 1941
- Identification: Pennant number N37
- Fate: Scrapped 9 March 1947
- Badge

General characteristics
- Class & type: British T class submarine
- Displacement: 1,090 tons surfaced; 1,575 tons submerged
- Length: 275 ft (84 m)
- Beam: 26 ft 6 in (8.08 m)
- Draught: 16.3 ft (5.0 m)
- Propulsion: Two shafts; Twin diesel engines 2,500 hp (1.86 MW) each; Twin electric motors 1,450 hp (1.08 MW) each
- Speed: 15.25 knots (28.24 km/h; 17.55 mph) surfaced; 9 knots (17 km/h; 10 mph) submerged
- Range: 4,500 nautical miles at 11 knots (8,330 km at 20 km/h) surfaced
- Test depth: 300 ft (91 m) max
- Complement: 61
- Armament: 6 internal forward-facing 21-inch (533 mm) torpedo tubes; 2 external forward-facing torpedo tubes; 3 external backward-facing torpedo tubes; 6 reload torpedoes; 1 x 4-inch (102 mm) deck gun; 3 anti-aircraft machine guns

HMS Thrasher (N37) was a T-class submarine of the Royal Navy. She was laid down by Cammell Laird & Co Limited, Birkenhead, launched in November 1940, and had an active career in the Mediterranean and Pacific Far East.

== Mediterranean ==
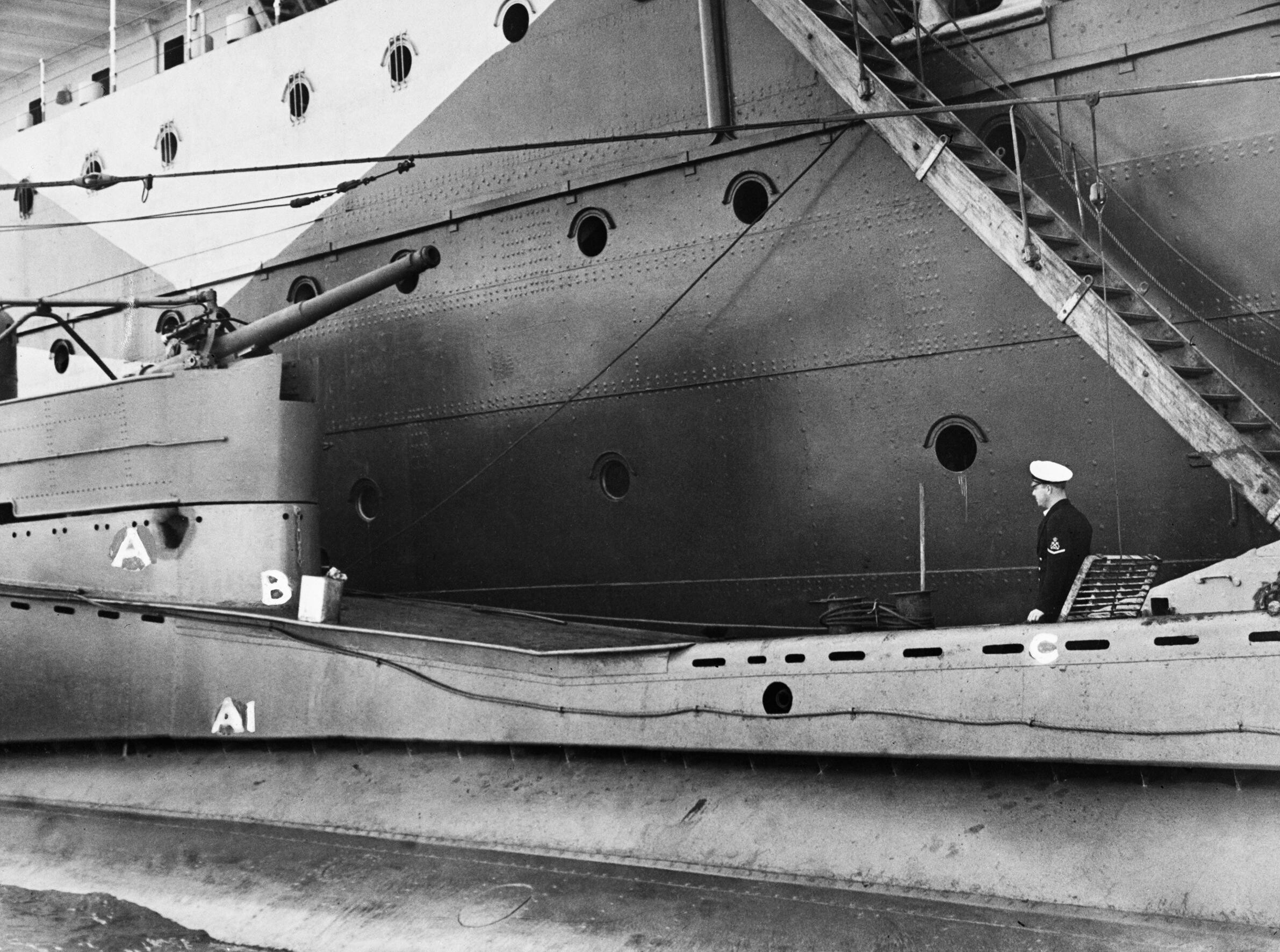
Damage to the casing of HMS Thrasher after two bombs struck her off Crete on the night of 15–16 February 1942. Neither exploded and both were removed by two members of the crew (IWM A8710)

Thrasher began her service by heavily damaging the French fishing vessel Virgo Fidelis in the Bay of Biscay, while in transit to the Mediterranean. The Virgo Fidelis was beached, but declared a total loss. Once in the Mediterranean she sank a number of ships, including three Greek sailing vessels, one of which was the San Stefano; the Italian sailing vessel Esperia; the Italian merchants Attilio Deffenu, Fedora, Gala, Penelope, Lero, Sant'Antonio and Padenna; the German army cargo ship Atlas; the Italian tugs Pilo and Roma; and the Italian aviso Diana. She also unsuccessfully attacked the German transport Ankara and the German merchant Arkadia. She also attacked the German barge F 184, but was forced to withdraw due to return fire. In July 1942, Thrasher was bombed in error by a British Fairey Swordfish aircraft off Port Said, Egypt, causing damage that took a month to repair.

Thrasher sank 20,000 long tons (22,000 short tons; 20,000 t) of enemy shipping during the Mediterranean campaign.

== Double VC ==
On 16 February 1942 north of Crete, Thrasher was attacked after sinking a supply ship. After the boat surfaced, two unexploded bombs were discovered in the gun-casing. Lieutenant Peter Scawen Watkinson Roberts and Petty Officer Thomas William Gould removed the first one without too much difficulty, but the second was lying in a very confined space and they had to approach it lying full length. Gould lay on his back with the bomb in his arms while Roberts dragged him along by the shoulders. It was 50 minutes before they got the bomb clear and dropped it over the side. As a result of their heroic actions which likely saved Thrasher, both men were awarded the Victoria Cross. The citation read

"The King has been Graciously pleased to approve of the grant of the Victoria Cross for great valour while serving in HM Submarine Thrasher to Lieutenant Peter Scawen Watkinson Roberts, RN and Petty Officer Thomas William Gould. "On February 16th, in daylight, HM Submarine Thrasher attacked and sank a heavily escorted supply ship. She was at once attacked by depth-charges and was bombed by aircraft. The presence of two unexploded bombs in the gun-casing was discovered when after dark the submarine surfaced and began to roll. Lieutenant Roberts and Petty Officer Gould volunteered to remove the bombs, which were of a type unknown to them. The danger in dealing with the second bomb was very great. To reach it they had to go through the casing, which was so low that they had to lie at full length to move in it. Through this narrow space, in complete darkness, they pushed and dragged the bomb for a distance of some 20 feet until it could be lowered over the side. Every time the bomb was moved there was a loud twanging noise as of a broken spring which added nothing to their peace of mind. This deed was more gallant as HM Submarine Thrasher's presence was known to the enemy; she was close to the enemy coast and in waters where his patrols were known to be active day and night. There was a very great chance, and they knew it, that the submarine might have to crash-dive while they were under the casing. Had this happened they must have been drowned."

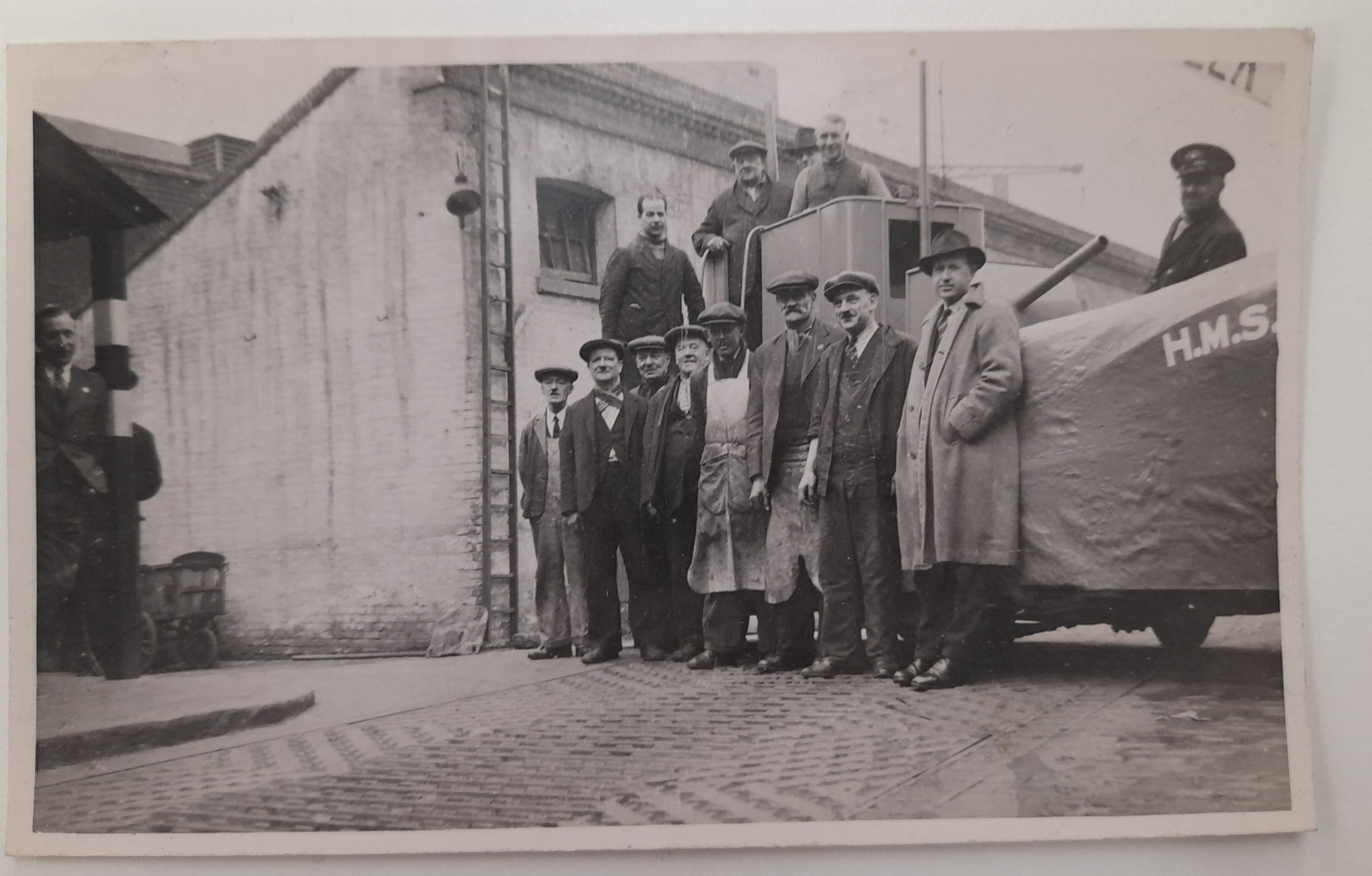
Men standing by and on a model of HMS Thrasher made for Shoreditch Warship Week 1943, Lieutenant H. S. Mackenzie, Commander at right.

The Metropolitan Borough of Shoreditch adopted HMS Thrasher during Warship Week 1943. Lieutenant Mackenzie DSO, Commander of Thrasher, was presented with the freedom of the borough by the Mayor of Shoreditch, Councillor T. J. Stillitoe OBE and, with some of the crew, attended a reception lunch at Shoreditch Town Hall on 26 February 1943, followed by a tour of some of the borough's bomb sites.

Eighteen officers and crew of HMS Thrasher were invited to Buckingham Palace to be decorated by King George VI in March 1943 for their valour and endurance on eighteen months of Mediterranean patrols.

== Far East ==
Thrasher was assigned to the Far East in the early part of 1945. She sank 20 sailing vessels and four coasters before the end of the war.

She survived the war and was broken up for scrap at one of the yards of Thos. W. Ward, Briton Ferry, Wales on 9 March 1947.

== Bibliography ==
- Caruana, Joseph (2012). "Emergency Victualling of Malta During WWII". Warship International. LXIX (4): 357–364. ISSN 0043-0374.
- Colledge, J. J.; Warlow, Ben (2006) [1969]. Ships of the Royal Navy: The Complete Record of All Fighting Ships of the Royal Navy from the 15th Century to the Present (3rd Rev ed.). London: Chatham Publishing. ISBN 978-1-86176-281-8. OCLC 67375475.
- Hutchinson, Robert (2001). Jane's Submarines: War Beneath the Waves from 1776 to the Present Day. London: HarperCollins. ISBN 978-0-00-710558-8. OCLC 53783010.
