= Action (newspaper) =

British newspaper(s) associated with fascism

- Type: Weekly newspaper
- Owner: British Union of Fascists (BUF)
- Editor: Alexander Raven Thomson (from 1939)
- Founded: 1936
- Ceased publication: 1940
- Political alignment: Fascism
- Language: English
- Country: United Kingdom
- Sister newspapers: The Blackshirt

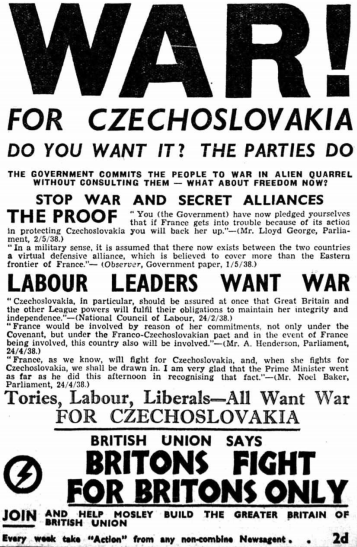
An advertisement for the British Union in Action, 1938

Action was a newspaper of Oswald Mosley's British Union of Fascists (BUF). The paper first appeared in 1936. The editor of the paper from 1939 was Alexander Raven Thomson, the BUF's chief ideologue. It ceased publication in 1940 due to the outbreak of the Second World War and the internment of the BUF's leadership. In fact the British government banned the paper. For most of its existence, Action ran parallel to the official mouthpiece of the BUF, The Blackshirt. After the launch of the less hard-line and more intellectual Action, The Blackshirt became more low-brow and finally ceased publication in 1939.

Action took its name from an earlier 1931 newspaper of the same name published by Mosley's New Party.

A later newspaper of the same name was published by the Union Movement from 1966.
