= Mouvement d'Action Civique =

Movement for Social Action Mouvement d'Action Civique
- Founded: 1960; 66 years ago (Note: The organisation officially formulated itself as the Mouvement d'Action Civique in September 1962.)
- Dissolved: 1963; 63 years ago
- Preceded by: Action and Defence Committee for Belgians in Africa (Note: Comité d'Action et de Défense des Belges d'Afrique)
- Succeeded by: Jeune Europe
- Newspaper: Belgique-Afrique
- Ideology: Fascism; Anti-communism; Belgian colonialism Belgian ultranationalism European nationalism
- Political position: Far-right
- European affiliation: National Party of Europe
- Colours: Black

Mouvement d'Action Civique (French pronunciation: [muvmɑ̃ daksjɔ̃ sivik], MAC; English: Movement for Social Action) was a minor far-right political movement in Belgium during the 1960s. The party's logo, a Celtic cross, was adopted in 1961 and was also the logo of the successor party, Jeune Europe.

The origins of the MAC lay in the 1960 independence of the Belgian Congo and the resulting Congo Crisis which saw the vast majority of white colonials, who were largely French-speaking, return to Belgium. From within this group a number of extremist organisation began to grow up, most notably the Comité d'Action et de Défense des Belges d'Afrique (CADBA or Committee for Action and the Defence of African Belgians), which had worked against the decolonization of the Belgian Congo. When this aim was not forthcoming (and became increasingly undesirable due to the trouble in Congo and the return of most Belgians) CADBA reinvented itself as the MAC, becoming more of an extremist white armed group. A minor movement, it worked with Jeune Europe domestically, as well as the British Union Movement and the Organisation armée secrète in France and was a founder member of the National Party of Europe.
