= European Liberation Front =

British neo-fascist organization

- Founder: Francis Parker Yockey; Guy Chesham; John Anthony Gannon
- Founded: 1948
- Dissolved: 1954
- Split from: Union Movement
- Ideology: Pan-European nationalism Third Position; Anti-Americanism; Anti-Zionism; Neo-Nazism
- Political position: Far-right

The European Liberation Front (ELF) was a neo-Nazi, pan-European nationalist group that split from Oswald Mosley's fascist Union Movement in 1948. Its founder was Francis Parker Yockey, alongside Guy Chesham and John Anthony Gannon. It issued a manifesto called The Proclamation of London, written by Yockey. It lasted until 1954. It would reach a maximum of 150 members

Yockey's domineering behaviour telling Guy Chesham to leave his wife, in Yockey's words "to leave the bitch", and to follow him into Bohemia cost him Chesham´s support.

Peter Huxley-Blythe was the only notable member of the organization, who had to suspend his participation in the organization due to being drafted into the Korean War.

The organization would publish a pamphlet entitled, The Proclamation of London.

Some point afterwards there was briefly a new organisation, which went by the same name that was created in its inspiration by Christian Bouchet.
