= Europe a Nation =

Ideology developed by Oswald Mosley

Europe a Nation was a policy developed by the British fascist politician Oswald Mosley as the cornerstone of his Union Movement. It called for the integration of Europe into a single political entity. Although the idea failed to gain widespread support for the Union Movement, it proved highly influential on European far-right thought.

== Origins ==
The idea of a united Europe began to develop in the final days of the Second World War. Concepts such as Nation Europa and Eurafrika, both of which looked for an ever-closer union between European countries, gained some currency in the German far-right underground in the immediate aftermath of the war. Mosley, who had learned to read German during the war, was strongly influenced by a number of pamphlets discussing these ideas. Another important influence was Benito Mussolini's manifesto of the Italian Social Republic, which included a call for the establishment of a European Community.

For his part, Mosley would later claim that he had first advocated something akin to Europe a Nation in speeches as early as 1936. In Mosley's essay The World Alternative published in 1936 he wrote "We must return to the fundamental concept of European union which animated the war generation of 1918," and he proposed "the union of Europe within the universalism of the Modern Movement." It was not, however, British Union of Fascists policy at any time. In Mosley's 1938 book Tomorrow We Live he declared that BUF policy favoured a "united Europe" and a "New Europe".

== Development ==
Mosley first presented his idea of Europe forming a single state in his book The Alternative in 1947. He argued that the traditional vision of nationalism that had inspired pre-war fascism had been too narrow and that the post-war era required a new paradigm in which Europe would come together as a single state. He rejected any notion of a federal Europe, instead urging full political integration into a supranational European state. The policy was presented to the wider electorate in October 1948 when Mosley called for elections to a European Assembly as the first step towards his vision.

The notion also had an important geopolitical dimension as Mosley saw it as the only defence against Europe being torn apart by power struggles between the United States and the Soviet Union in the Cold War. He contended that the racial kinship between the peoples of Northern Europe (Germans, British, Scandinavians, northern French, West Slavs, and East Slavs) would be the basis for national unity, whilst also declaring his admiration for the contributions of South Europeans.

He was opposed to both the United Nations and its predecessor the League of Nations, dismissing both as part of a Jewish plot to undermine nationalism. Indeed, Europe a Nation was to include an antisemitic policy, with the entire Jewish population to be expelled to their own nation in Palestine.

Africa, most of which was still in the hands of the European colonial empires, was to be retained by the united Europe as a giant colony, with apartheid implemented throughout the continent, effectively excluding Blacks from Europe and from any indigenous rule in Africa. Economic autarky was a central aim, with Africa to be exploited for its mineral and food resources, as proposed by Anton Zischka.

Mosley subsequently imagined the European state as regulating its prices and incomes by a "wage price mechanism" under "European Socialism", a syndical basis for the continent's industry, a vision steeped in corporatism and elitism. As in Fascist Italy, elections were to be corporatist with an occupation-based franchise (a previous British Union of Fascists policy), whilst "European Socialism" was to allow a free hand for business leaders but to co-ordinate workers in "labour Charter" organizations.

Mosley summed up by stating that 'no lesser degree of union than that of an integral nation can give the will and power to act on the great scale. ... No lesser space than all Europe, and the overseas possessions of Europe in a common pool, can give the room within which to act effectively'. Europe a Nation drew heavily on the heritage of fascism: Graham Macklin has argued that it "merely adapted and enlarged the parameters of his fascist panacea to suit the times, and is thus easily recognisable as 'Fascist'".

Mosley expanded upon his ideas for a single integrated European nation state and a European government in his book Europe: Faith and Plan published in 1958.

== Impact ==
Within the UK, the notion of Europe a Nation largely failed to attract the younger far-right activists, most of whom deserted Mosley in favour of the League of Empire Loyalists (LEL) and other smaller and more extreme groups. A.K. Chesterton, who went on to lead the LEL, was a strong critic of Europe a Nation from its first publication, preferring British nationalism.

The proposal also failed to convince the British electorate, with the Union Movement enjoying minor electoral success only when they emphasised more basic anti-immigrant rhetoric. Even Alexander Raven Thomson, Mosley's sycophantic lieutenant, concluded by 1950 that Europe a Nation held little attraction to British voters. The Union Movement briefly downplayed the idea, but Thomson's preferred alternative of neo-Nazism was soon abandoned as well.

Within the wider European far-right, however, Europe a Nation gained some wider support. Fritz Rössler, at the time under the alias Dr. Franz Richter, became an enthusiastic supporter and attempted to make it Deutsche Reichspartei policy. He failed and was expelled from the party, decamping to the Socialist Reich Party instead. For a time it also had the support of Adolf von Thadden, who helped Mosley organise the National Party of Europe, a largely failed attempt to build a continental Europe a Nation political party. Ultimately however the plan's main supporter in Germany proved to be Arthur Erhardt, who established the journal Nation Europa to support far-right pan-European nationalist ideas, to which Mosley was a frequent contributor.

Outside Germany it also gained some currency within the Italian Social Movement, although by the early 1950s that wing of the party lost influence, the Italian nationalist arm gaining supremacy. Similar ideas of Europeanism would later be developed by Jean-François Thiriart, and Alain de Benoist who founded the think tank Groupement de recherche et d'études pour la civilisation européenne in 1968.

== See also ==
- The European
- Fourth Reich
- National Party of Europe
- Pan-European identity
- European Union
- Pan-European nationalism
- Pan-nationalism
- United States of Europe
