= Alexander Raven Thomson =

Scottish politician and philosopher (1899–1955)

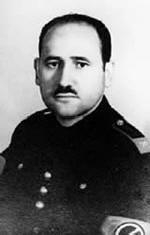
- Born: 3 December 1899; Edinburgh, Scotland
- Died: 30 October 1955 (aged 55); London, England
- Citizenship: British
- Occupation: Mechanical engineer
- Known for: Fascist politician and writer
- Political party: British Union of Fascists, Union Movement
- Spouse: Lisbeth Röntgen
- Children: Three
- Relatives: Alexander Thomson (grandfather)

Alexander Raven Thomson (3 December 1899 – 30 October 1955), usually referred to as Raven, was a Scottish politician and philosopher. He joined the British Union of Fascists in 1933 and remained a follower of Oswald Mosley for the rest of his life. Thomson was considered to be the party's chief ideologue and has been described as the "Alfred Rosenberg of British fascism".

== Early life ==
Born in Edinburgh, Thomson came from a family long prominent in Scottish public life and was the grandson of the architect Alexander Thomson. Thomson was educated in universities in his homeland, the United States and briefly Heidelberg University in Germany and studied mechanical engineering, science and philosophy. In 1926, he became a partner in an engineering firm in London specialising in the manufacture of silver paper, a process that he had learned in Germany. During his studies in Germany, Thomson met and married Lisbeth, the daughter of the X-ray pioneer Wilhelm Conrad Röntgen. They would go on to have three children together; Lisbeth already had a daughter from a previous relationship, and Thomson also had a long-term mistress, Olive Burdett.

Thomson's political career began by joining the Communist Party of Great Britain, but his membership did not last long since he rejected notions of historical materialism and moved more towards corporatism. Thomson became a leading authority on the works of Oswald Spengler and in 1932 published the book Civilization as Divine Superman: A Superorganic Philosophy of History, which rejected Spengler's theories about the decline of civilisation and argued that it could be avoided by the rejection of capitalism and its replacement with collectivism.

In that conviction he was influenced by Maurice Maeterlinck, who had written of "insect communities" in which a communal spirit was shared by all members of a "hive". The book also marked his drift towards a fascistic outlook.

== British Union of Fascists ==
He joined the British Union of Fascists in 1933 and soon rose to the post of Director of Policy. There, he became the leading ideological light in the party and a close associate of Oswald Mosley and Neil Francis Hawkins. In that position, he produced his seminal work The Corporate State (March 1935, republished as The Coming Corporate State in January 1937) in which he set out the vision of a BUF government in Britain. Thomson envisaged the formation of 20 corporations, each controlling a specific sector of the economy. The corporations would be further divided up to cover each individual industry and would also feed into a National Corporation, which would effectively form the government. Corporations would have equal representation for employers, workers and consumers, with elections to the corporations taking the place of existing political activity. In 1935, he was sent to his native Scotland on a speaking tour designed to present the fascist message, but most of his engagements were disrupted by communist hecklers, including one at Aberdeen in which an extended chorus of The Internationale from the crowd effectively silenced the BUF speakers.

Thomson became a leading figure in the BUF and in 1937 represented the party in municipal elections in Bethnal Green (SW). He won 23.17% of the votes and finished ahead of the Liberal candidates. Although he was not elected, the result marked a good total for the BUF. His status in the party now assured, Thomson became editor of the party weekly, Action, in 1939.

An important figure in the BUF, he served for a time as Mosley's representative to Germany, a role in which he was closely watched by MI5. He shared with the Nazis a strong anti-Semitism and was generally noted as an admirer of Nazi Germany. He was part of BUF delegation that attended the 1933 Nuremberg Rally. He made a total of five extended trips to Nazi Germany. Despite being one of the public faces of the BUF, he had actually been interviewed by The Jewish Chronicle in 1934 and had told the newspaper that the group had no specific enmity towards the Jews. Thomson also had loose connections to hardline Revisionist Zionism activist Wolfgang von Weisl, but they were curtailed after von Weisl's superior, Ze'ev Jabotinsky, told him to break off relations.

Mosley admired Thomson for his intellect and would later describe him as an "honest man and devoted patriot" but was also known to criticise him privately as something of a "yes-man". In 1937, Thomson wrote that the British left had enforced "specifically Anglo-Saxon democratic methods of parliamentary governance" upon Ireland to which it was "entirely foreign and distasteful". Thomson also believed that a United Ireland would occur under fascism, an ideology that was less foreign to the "native Celtic culture".

After the outbreak of war, Thomson devised a plan to attack the Nordic League as "Nazi traitors" in the hope of establishing the BUF's patriotic credentials, but that came to nothing and actually ran alongside attempts by Francis Hawkins to establish BUF control over the League. Along with most of the other leading members of the BUF, Thomson was detained under Defence Regulation 18B in May 1940 and interned for much of the Second World War. He spent his entire jail spell in Brixton Prison, rather than the prison camp on the Isle of Man, which was generally more favourable, until his release in 1944. Thomson reacted badly to his spell in detention and suffered a nervous breakdown during his incarceration. He was released after he had been moved to a camp on the Isle of Man in September 1944.

== Union Movement ==
After his release Thomson set up a number of book clubs across Britain to ensure the continuing spread of Mosley's ideas. The book clubs served as planning meetings for the future of Mosleyite politics after the war. He also led the Union of British Freemen, a group he set up with the fellow ex-BUF member Victor Burgess in 1944 as an attempt to bring together former BUF members. After the war, Thomson travelled regularly to Ireland to meet Mosley and to discuss political development. Eager to expand the base of operations of fascism in Britain he also sought unsuccessfully to forge alliances with the proto-environmentalist Rural Reconstruction Association through the leading member Jorian Jenks, a former BUF activist, as well as individuals on the fringes of Welsh nationalism.

He joined the Union Movement on its foundation in 1948 and became a leading figure in the new party as both general secretary and the editor of the UM newspaper Union. Playing a leading role in the development of the ideology of the UM, Thomson initially supported Europe a Nation enthusiastically, but soon tired of the esoteric policy and in 1950 organised a brief and even more unsuccessful return to prewar policy. He then came to advocate a "left-wing fascist" approach and argued that the UM should target the working class for support with anticapitalist rhetoric.

As well as his important position within the UM domestically, Thomson was also a central figure in the party's international links. Thomson was sent to Spain in 1949 to try to build up support for Mosley in the country, but the trip was somewhat unsuccessful as he failed to impress the falangists and had to contend with the negative words of former BUF member Angus Macnab, who had grown to loathe Mosley.

Later, Thomson was central in liaising with the New European Order, a group with which Mosley had no official contact with because of his support for the European Social Movement. Thomson's international reputation grew further in 1952 when he was appointed to the editorial board of the prestigious Nation Europa magazine. He also became known as the publisher of Frederick J. Veale's Advance to Barbarism, one of the early pieces of Second World War historical revisionism and contributed to The European, a magazine edited by Diana Mosley.

Thomson continued to serve as leading UM figure until his death in 1955 from cancer. Thomson, who had lived most of his life in the East End of London, had his funeral service at St Columba's Church, Shoreditch before he was cremated.
