= Pan-European nationalism =

Far-right ultra-nationalism

European nationalism (sometimes called pan-European nationalism or Euro-nationalism) is a form of pan-nationalism based on a pan-European identity. It has been only a minor far-right tendency since the National Party of Europe disintegrated in the 1970s.

It is distinct from Pro-Europeanism and European Federalism in being a chiefly ethno-nationalist ideology, as opposed to support of the European Union and European integration. Prominent ideologues of European nationalist thought include Oswald Mosley, Francis Parker Yockey, and René Binet.

== History ==
The former British Union of Fascists leader, Oswald Mosley, led the Union Movement and advocated its "Europe a Nation" policy from 1948 to 1973. In 1950, Mosley co-founded the European Social Movement and collaborated with comparable groups on the Continent. The organisation was mostly defunct by 1957 and was succeeded by the National Party of Europe, which was formed in 1962 by Mosley and the leaders of the German nationalist Deutsche Reichspartei, the Italian Social Movement, Jeune Europe and the Mouvement d'Action Civique. The movement remained active during the 1960s but was mostly disbanded in the 1970s.

Besides Oswald Mosley, Francis Parker Yockey was another major supporter of European transnationalism. Both Mosley and Yockey were influenced by the German philosopher Oswald Spengler but diverged both from him and each other on the issue of whether the Western civilization's collapse was inevitable or avoidable. Another major point of contention between Yockey and Mosley was their attitude towards the United States and the Soviet Union. Mosley was favoring the US as an ally against the project of the world communism, while Yockey favored the Soviet Union as an ally against the "Jewish-American hegemony". Initially Yockey and Mosley worked together, but after their split Yockey founded the European Liberation Front and denounced Mosley as an "American agent". Yockey elaborated that the aftermath of the Second World War saw Europe being divided and occupied by the "extra-European powers" — the United States and the Soviet Union, and that it would be impossible for Europe to liberate itself and reassert its sovereignty without acting in concert. However, Yockey saw the American occupation of Europe as more harmful and spiritually perverting the Europe, unlike the Soviets who mostly relied on crude force to establish their control, which Yockey perceived as less harmful and effective than spiritual perversion. Therefore, Yockey worked with the Arab nationalists and Soviets against the American hegemony.

In 1949, Yockey published the Proclamation of London as the ELF manifesto, which stated "two great tasks" of the organization: "(1) the complete expulsion of everything alien from the soul and from the soil of Europe, the cleansing of the European soul of the dross of 19th century materialism and rationalism with its money-worship, liberal-democracy, social degeneration, parliamentarism, class-war, feminism, vertical nationalism, finance-capitalism, petty-statism, chauvinism, the Bolshevism of Moscow and Washington, the ethical syphilis of Hollywood, and the spiritual leprosy of New York; (2) the construction of the Imperium of Europe and the actualizing of the divinely-emanated European will to unlimited political Imperialism".

=== 1962 European Declaration ===
In their "European Declaration" of 1 March 1962, the National Party of Europe called for the creation of a European nation-state through a common European government, an elected European parliament, the withdrawal of American and Soviet forces from Europe and the dissolution of the United Nations, which would be replaced by an international body led by the United States, the Soviet Union and Europe as three equals. The territory of the European state was to be that of all European nations outside the Soviet Union, including the British Isles, and their overseas possessions.

=== Current situation ===
Romanian-French writer Jean Parvulesco argued for a “great Eurasian pan-European empire” uniting “Western Europe and Eastern Europe, Russia and Greater Siberia, India and Japan”, against the United Kingdom and the United States. He was one of the proponents of a Paris-Berlin-Moscow Axis to counter "Anglo-Saxon hegemony" since at least the 1960s.

In 2014, Raphael Schlembach describes the existence of "a form of pan-European nationalism — a 'Europe for the Europeans' — that is based upon anti-Americanism and ethno-pluralism" within "some sections" of European neo-fascism. European nationalist organisations continued to exist on a minor scale after the disintegration of the National Party of Europe in the 1970s, but no group advocates a "European nation state".

According to scholars, former European nationalist groups now propose a European ethnic federalism based on an ideology of "European culturalism" or, according to Dimitri Almeida, they underwent a "Eurosceptic turn", the ideology of European nationalism being largely replaced by hard Euroscepticism by the 2010s.

==== European Parliament ====
Identity and Democracy grouping was a far-right political group of the European Parliament launched on 13 June 2019 for the Ninth European Parliament. It was composed of nationalist, right-wing populist and eurosceptic national parties from nine European nations. It was the successor to the Europe of Nations and Freedom group, which was formed during the Eighth European Parliament. Its members were the Freedom Party of Austria, Flemish Interest (Belgium), Freedom and Direct Democracy (Czechia), the Danish People's Party, the Conservative People's Party of Estonia, the Finns Party, National Rally (France), Lega Nord (Italy) and the Party for Freedom (Netherlands). Other nationalist parties included the European Conservatives and Reformists (ECR), which also included nationalist, right-wing populist and eurosceptic national parties from 12 countries.

=== List of European nationalist organisations ===
Identitarian Movement · Jeune Europe (Belgium) · Comité de liaison des européens révolutionnaires (France) · Parti Communautaire National-Européen (Belgium) · Nouvelle Droite (France) · Réseau Radical · Bloc Identitaire · Parti Nationaliste Français et Européen (France) · Imperium Europa (Malta) · le parti des européens (France) · Reconquista Europa (Ukraine)

== Arendt's warning ==
Hannah Arendt warned in 1954 that a "pan-European nationalism" might arise from the cultivation of anti-American sentiment in Europe. Her warning has been deemed obsolete by the 1990s:

- Gerard Delanty argued, "Europe could never constitute a coherent identity because there is 'no external opposition' to it" (a role foreseen by Arendt as to be taken by America).
- In the opinion of the scholar Anton Speekenbrink in 2014, nationalism was replaced by a "postmodern world order" in the postwar period ("Nationalism was dead, but it was not replaced by pan-European nationalism or by a pan-European identity"). It instead invoked a "European idea", which was said to be transformed into an "idea of diversity of identity" combined with a "commonality of values".

== See also ==
- Fourth Reich
- Identitarian movement
- Nativism
- White nationalism
- White Unity
