= Friends of Oswald Mosley =

The flag of the British Union of Fascists, which is also the symbol of the Friends of Oswald Mosley.

The Friends of Oswald Mosley (FOM) is the last vestige of Oswald Mosley's British Union of Fascists (BUF) and its successors, the Union Movement and the Action Party.

== History ==
The Friends of Oswald Mosley was formed in 1982. It represents the last vestige of Oswald Mosley's British Union of Fascists and its successors the Union Movement and the Action Party. Their motto is "The spirit lives ... the rest will follow".

== Activities ==
The Friends are not politically active. They publish a journal, Comrade, (No. 1 March 1986) which consists mainly of reminiscences and obituaries of figures active in the pre-Second World War days of the BUF. The Daily Telegraph, in its obituary of John Warburton (1919–2004), described Comrade as "the newsletter for veteran Blackshirts which soon developed into a journal that provided much primary material on the movement's history."

The Friends also organise dinners, reunions, social events and film-shows of speeches by Oswald Mosley and BUF rallies, which are attended by veteran former members of Mosley's post-war Union Movement and younger sympathisers. Diana Mitford, Mosley's second wife was associated with FOM and spoke at a number of their functions in London.

In a 2016 article on the British far right published by The Guardian, a spokesperson described the group's views as "...pro-Islam, pro-EU, against US global supremacy, anti-capitalist, anti-state socialism, [and] pro-syndicalism".
