= Union Movement =

British far-right political party, 1948–1973

Union Movement / Action Party
- Founder: Sir Oswald Ernald Mosley
- Founded: 1948
- Dissolved: 1973
- Preceded by: British Union of Fascists
- Merged into: National Front
- Succeeded by: Action Party (Later League of Saint George)
- Ideology: Europe a Nation; Pan-European nationalism
- Political position: Far-right
- European Parliament group: European Social Movement (1951–1960s); National Party of Europe (1960s)
- Colours: Red White Blue

Party flag

The Union Movement (UM), also known as the Action Party, was a far-right political party founded in the United Kingdom founded by Sir Oswald Mosley. Before the Second World War, Mosley's British Union of Fascists (B.U.F) had wanted to concentrate trade within the British Empire, but the Union Movement attempted to stress the importance of developing a European nationalism, rather than a narrower country-based nationalism. That has caused the Union Movement to be characterised as an attempt by Mosley to start again in his political life by embracing more democratic and international policies than those with which he had previously been associated. The UM has been described as post-fascist by former members such as Robert Edwards, the founder of the pro-Mosley European Action, a British pressure group and monthly newspaper.

== Mosley's postwar activity ==
Having been the leader of the BUF in the 1930s, Mosley was expected to return to lead the far right. However, he remained out of the immediate postwar political arena, instead turned to writing and published his first work, My Answer (1946) in which he argued that he had been a patriot who had been unjustly punished by his internment under Defence Regulation 18B. In it and his 1947 sequel, The Alternative, Mosley began to argue for a much-closer integration between the nations of Europe, the beginning of his 'Europe a Nation' campaign, which sought a strong united Europe as a counterbalance to the growing power of the United States and the Soviet Union.

== Europe a Nation ==
Mosley perceived a linear growth within British history and saw Europe a Nation as the culmination of that destiny. Therefore, he argued it to be "part of an organic process of British history" since Britain had united into one nation and that it was Britain's national destiny to unite the whole continent.

He further envisaged a three-tiered system of government, headed by an elected European government, to organise defence and the corporatist economy. The continuation of national governments and a collection of local governments were still seen as necessary for the sake of independent identities.

Mosley's ideas were not new since concepts of a Nation Europa and Eurafrika (the same idea but with parts of north Africa included as natural sectors of Europe's traditional sphere of influence, an idea that Mosley himself felt had some merit) were already growing in Germany's postwar underground. Also, Benito Mussolini's Italian Social Republic had returned to fascism's roots with an attempt at a corporatist economic system during its brief existence. Nonetheless, Mosley was the first to express the ideas in English, and it came as no surprise when he returned to proper political activism in 1948. Those plans were to form the basis for the policy programme of the Union Movement.

== Formation of party ==
A flowchart showing the history of the early British fascist movement

After the release of interned fascists at the end of the Second World War, a number of far-right groups were formed. They were often virulently anti-Semitic and tried to capitalise on the violent events taking place in Mandatory Palestine. Large meetings were organised in Jewish areas of East London and elsewhere, which were often violently broken up by antifascist groups such as the 43 Group. Fifty-one separate groups were united under Mosley's leadership in the Union Movement (UM), launched at a meeting in Farringdon Hall, London, in 1948. The four main groups were Jeffrey Hamm's British League of Ex-Servicemen and Women, Anthony Gannon's Imperial Defence League, Victor Burgess's Union of British Freedom and Horace Gowing and Tommy Moran's Sons of St George, all of which were led by ex-BUF men. Another early member was Francis Parker Yockey, an American who had come to England to seek Mosley's help to publish his written work. Yockey briefly headed up the UM's European Contact Section, although he left after a dispute with Mosley.

The Union Movement was also known for its attempts to recruit Irish people living in Britain, and Mosley wrote a pamphlet in 1948, Ireland's Right to Unite when entering European Union. There were also links between the UM and the Irish nationalist and pro-fascist party Ailtirí na hAiséirghe (Architects of the Resurrection), and Mosley wrote articles for its newspaper Aiséirghe.

Mosley remained a critic of liberal democracy, and the UM instead extolled a strong executive that people could endorse or reject through regular referendums, with an independent judiciary in place to appoint replacements in the event of a rejection. In 1948 the party marched 1,500 supporters through Camden and went on to contest the following year's local elections in London. However, outside Shoreditch and Bethnal Green, where they polled 15.7% and 7.7% respectively in the wards contested, the UM performed very poorly and secured no representation. The Union Movement then declined as a political party, and attendance at meetings dwindled until it was negligible. Disillusioned by the stern opposition that the UM faced and his style of street politics being exposed as somewhat passé, in 1951 Mosley went into self-imposed exile in Ireland.

A member of Union Movement called F.B. Price-Heywood was elected as a councillor in Grasmere, Lake District, Cumbria, during the 1953 local elections, but it was a rare success for the party, and the UM gained no parliamentary seats.

The Union Movement published several weekly newspapers and monthly magazines including Union, Action (also the title of the prewar weekly newspaper of the New Party and the British Union of Fascists), Attack, Alternative, East London Blackshirt, The European and National European.

== Racial tensions and rise of party ==
After the British Nationality Act 1948, there was a great increase in immigration, particularly from the Commonwealth and the colonies. In the early 1950s, immigration was estimated at 8,000–10,000 per year, but it had grown to 35,000 per year by 1957. Perceptions of the new migrant workers were frequently stereotypical, but the Conservative Party, despite the private opinions of some of its members, was loath to make a political issue out of it for fear of being seen as gutter politicians. Disturbances occurred in 1958 in Notting Hill after a Mosley rally and in Nottingham with clashes between racial groups, a new phenomenon in Britain.

The new uncertainties revitalised the UM, and Mosley re-emerged to stand as a candidate in the 1959 general election in Kensington North, which included Notting Hill, his first parliamentary election since 1931. Mosley made immigration his campaign issue and combined calls for assisted repatriation with stories regarding criminality and sexual deviance of black people, a common theme of the time. The 8.1% share of the vote that he secured was a personal humiliation for a man who still hoped that he would be called to serve someday as the British prime minister. However, the UM was as a whole buoyed by the immigration question, which it saw as the next big issue in British politics.

In April 1965, Mosley attempted to show that he and the UM were not racist by forming an "Associate Movement" for ethnic minorities who agreed with his policies, including the financially-assisted repatriation of immigrants to their homelands of origin. The group was led by an Indian solicitor and an African airline pilot but was short-lived.

== Final days ==
Along with his domestic politics, Mosley continued to work towards his goal of Europe a Nation and in 1962 attended a conference in Venice at which he helped to form a National Party of Europe, along with Germany's Reichspartei, the Mouvement d'Action Civique, and Jeune Europe of Belgium and the Italian Social Movement (MSI). Adopting the slogan "Progress - Solidarity - Unity", the movement aimed to work closely for a closer unity of European states, but in the end, little came of it as only the MSI enjoyed any success domestically. The group replaced the earlier European Social Movement in which Mosley had also been involved. The Union Movement itself did not play an active role in Europe, although it helped to set in motion co-operation between like-minded groups across Europe, which continued with the European National Front.

Mosley stood again in the 1966 election, this time in the Shoreditch and Finsbury constituency. However, gaining only 4.6% of the vote, Mosley effectively departed the scene thereafter, although he remained the official UM leader until 1973. The increasingly marginalised UM carried on into the 1970s and still advocated Europe A Nation but had no real influence and failed to capture support for its policies.

A brief revival seemed possible after the UM became the Action Party in 1973, the name under which it fought six seats at the Greater London Council election. Under the leadership of Jeffrey Hamm, the party hoped for something of a revival although it was damaged severely in 1974 when a leading member, Keith Thompson, and his followers split to form the League of Saint George, a non-party movement that they claimed was the true continuation of Mosley's ideas. With a sizeable chunk of its membership long since lost to the National Front, the Action Party gave up electoral politics and in 1978 became the Action Society, which acted as a publishing house rather than a political party. The group continued until Hamm's death in 1994, when the funding of Mosley's widow, Diana Mitford, was withdrawn. The Action Society was then wound up – this represented the final end of the Union Movement.

== Election results ==
=== House of Commons ===
Election year	# of seats contested	# of total votes	% of vote in seats contested	# of seats won	Rank
1950	Did not contest elections				
1951	Did not contest elections				
1955	Did not contest elections				
1959	1	▲2,821	▲8.1%	0	13
1964	Did not contest election				
1966	4	▲4,075	▼3.7%	0	14
1970	Did not contest election				

== In popular culture ==
The 1980s ITV television series Shine on Harvey Moon features members of Mosley's Union Movement. It was created by the writers Laurence Marks and Maurice Gran who would later produce the Channel 4 mini-series Mosley broadcast in 1998.

== See also ==
=== Well-known members ===
- John Bean
- Victor Burgess
- Jeffrey Hamm
- Neil Francis Hawkins
- Diana Mitford
- Tommy Moran
- Max Mosley
- Oswald Mosley
- Robert Row
- Keith Thompson
- Alexander Raven Thomson
- John G. Wood
- Francis Parker Yockey

=== Related groups and concepts ===
- British Union of Fascists
- Europe a Nation
- League of Saint George
- History of British fascism since 1945
- Friends of Oswald Mosley

== Bibliography ==
- Eatwell, R. (2003) Fascism: A History, Pimlico
- Mosley, Oswald (1970) My Life, Nelson Press
- Mosley, Oswald (1958) Europe: Faith and Plan, Euphorion Books
- Skidelsky, Robert (1975) Oswald Mosley, Macmillan
- Thurlow, R. (1998) Fascism in Britain, I.B. Tauris
- Macklin, Graham (2007) Very Deeply Dyed in Black: Sir Oswald Mosley and the Resurrection of British Fascism after 1945, I.B. Tauris
