= Jeffrey Hamm =

British fascist politician (1915–1992)

Personal details
- Born: Edward Jeffrey Hamm; 15 September 1915 Ebbw Vale, Wales, United Kingdom
- Died: 4 May 1992 (aged 76) United Kingdom
- Party: British Union of Fascists, Union Movement

Edward Jeffrey Hamm (15 September 1915 – 4 May 1992) was a leading British fascist and supporter of Oswald Mosley. Although a minor figure in Mosley's prewar British Union of Fascists, Hamm became a leading figure after the Second World War and eventually succeeded as leader of the Union Movement after Mosley's retirement.

== Early life ==
Hamm was born in Ebbw Vale, Wales, whilst his father was serving in the First World War. The family later relocated to Monmouth. It has been claimed that he first became attracted to the British Union of Fascists (BUF) in 1934 on a trip to London, when he chanced upon a party member delivering a speech and was impressed.

== British Union of Fascists ==
He joined the BUF in 1935 when he relocated to London to take up a teaching role at King's School, Harrow. A young member, Hamm did not rise above the rank and file in the BUF. In 1939 he moved to the Falkland Islands to work as a teacher, where he was arrested in 1940 under Defence Regulation 18B after he had been accused of encouraging fascism to his pupils. He was transferred to Leeuwkop, South Africa, where he was involved in an attempt to tunnel out of the camp. The camp also contained some German Nazi prisoners, and a contemporary MI5 report suggested Hamm had been indoctrinated by Nazi propaganda by his fellow inmates. He was returned to Britain in 1941 and enlisted in the Royal Tank Regiment, but during his service, he was identified as a disruptive influence and was taken off the front before his discharge in 1944. He found work at the Royal Coach Works in Acton after his discharge, and he subsequently was a bookkeeper at a milliner shop.

Around then, Hamm converted to the Roman Catholic Church under the influence of Father Clement Russell, a Nazi sympathiser and anti-Semite based in Wembley who kept a photograph of Mosley on display in his parochial house. Hamm and his wife were married by Russell, with the climax of the ceremony coming with the couple saluting a Nazi flag.

== Return to politics ==
Hamm had been a minor figure in the BUF, but his time in the prison camps had increased his support for Mosley. Indeed, such had been his low standing in the movement that Mosley did not know who Hamm was and for a time struggled to spell Hamm's surname properly. Nonetheless, Hamm quickly became the most vigorous and vocal of Mosley's post-internment supporters.

After his discharge, Hamm joined and then took over the British League of Ex-Servicemen and Women, which claimed to look after veterans' interests and converted it to a movement designed to keep Mosley's ideas current. Seeking to keep British fascism alive, Hamm organized a series of meetings in Hyde Park from November 1944 onwards and later moved them to the traditional BUF areas of East London. Hamm's League rallies eventually began to attract thousands, which convinced him that a proper political return was a distinct possibility. Hamm's rallies also attracted significant opposition, with clashes between his supporters and antifascists. However, the group's first public campaign actually took place in the Metropolitan Borough of Hampstead, where, with Hamm having become associated with Eleonora Tennant, it helped to organise a petition to keep immigrants out of new houses, ostensibly on the pretext that the housing should be kept for returning soldiers. As a result of his involvement, Hamm secured publicity for the League. It also gave him access to leading figures such as Ernest Benn and Waldron Smithers, who had been involved in the initial drawing up of the petition.

Hamm's increasing profile did not go unnoticed by both supporters and opponents, and in 1946, he and his ally Victor Burgess suffered a severe beating from antifascists. (A similar incident in Brighton in 1948 resulted in Hamm spending time in hospital.) Mosley was initially unsure of Hamm, but at a secret meeting in Bethnal Green on 22 December 1946, he endorsed Hamm's leadership and declared him his "East End representative", East London being traditionally the centre of Mosleyite activity. In 1947, however, Mosley censured Hamm for the violent and inflammatory nature of much of his propaganda, which forced him to tone down his rhetoric.

== Union Movement ==
Hamm soon began calling on Mosley to return to the leadership of British fascism. Hamm incorporated his British League into the Union Movement (UM) immediately upon the latter's foundation in 1948. Hamm became a leading member of the new UM but was considered a spiky figure and was so unpopular at UM headquarters that Mosley sent him to Manchester in 1949. Hamm failed to revitalise the northern branch and contemplated leaving the UM altogether until he was recalled by Mosley in 1952. Returning to London, Hamm became a central figure in the new anti-black campaign of the UM, which won it some support in Brixton and other areas into which new West Indies immigrants were settling. He gained widespread press coverage when, in the immediate aftermath of the 1958 Notting Hill race riots, he made a speech outside Latimer Road tube station.

Hamm served as Mosley's personal secretary during the later years of the UM and succeeded to the post upon the death of Alexander Raven Thomson in 1955. Like Mosley, he was an ardent supporter of Irish unity and encouraged his leader to campaign on that issue. Hamm stood as a UM candidate at the 1966 general election in the Birmingham Handsworth constituency and polled 4% of the vote. Mosley effectively withdrew from public life afterward, and the UM came under the leadership of Hamm and Robert Row, the last two paid UM activists.

Mosley was officially UM leader until 1973, when he formally retired, and Hamm, who had become the effective leader, formally succeeded him. Under Hamm the party relaunched as the Action Party and under that name contested the 1973 Greater London Council elections without success. The party transformed itself into the Action Society in 1978 and gave up party politics to become a publishing house.

Hamm published his autobiography, Action Replay, in 1983, and in 1988 his second book, The Evil Good Men Do. After Mosley's death in December 1980, Hamm published and edited a quarterly pro-Mosley magazine, Lodestar, which included contributions by Diana Mosley, Colin Wilson and Brocard Sewell. He died from Parkinson's disease in 1992.

== Elections contested ==
Date of election	Constituency	Party	Votes	%
14 March 1962	Middlesbrough East	Union Movement	550	1.7
31 March 1966	Birmingham Handsworth	Union Movement	1337	4.1

== Bibliography ==
- Boothroyd, David (2001). The History of British Political Parties. London: Politicos Publishing. p. 3. ISBN 9781902301594.
- Dorril, Stephen (2007). Blackshirt - Sir Oswald Mosley & British Fascism. London / New York: Penguin. ISBN 978-0140258219.
- Macklin, Graham (2007). Very Deeply Dyed in Black. London / New York: IB Tauris. ISBN 978-1845112844.
- Skidelsky, Robert (1981). Oswald Mosley. Macmillan Publishers. p. 510.
- Taylor, Stan (1982). The National Front in English Politics. London / New York: MacMillan Holmes & Meier. ISBN 9780333277416.
- Thurlow, Richard (1987). Fascism in Britain A History, 1918-1985. Oxford / New York: Basil Blackwell. ISBN 0631136185.

== Archives ==
Papers of Edward Jeffrey Hamm are held at the Cadbury Research Library, University of Birmingham.
