= British Blackshirts =

Paramilitary wing of the British Union of Fascists

The British Blackshirts, usually known as the Blackshirts, were the paramilitary wing of the British Union of Fascists (BUF). The British Blackshirts took inspiration from German Brownshirts and Italian Blackshirts, who were major parts of their respective countries' fascist movements. The British Blackshirts were created by Sir Oswald Mosley, the creator and leader of the British Union of Fascists, on 1 October 1932. They operated until their dissolution on 23 May 1940, when Oswald Mosley was jailed by the British government. The Blackshirts and the British Union of Fascists took their ideology from Sir Oswald Mosley's book, The Greater Britain.

== Origins and uniform ==
Following the foundation of the BUF on 1 October 1932, Mosley recognised the need for a disciplined, internal force which would protect party meetings from communist and anti-fascist disruptors. The distinctive uniform was introduced shortly after the party's formation. It consisted of a black polo-neck sweater, known as the action shirt, a military-style belt, and dark trousers. The shirt originally featured a fasces near the wearer's heart, but it was later changed to the BUF's flash and circle symbol. Mosley chose the black shirt for two reasons: to signal ideological alignment with Mussolini's regime, and to strip away visible class distinctions from party members which would foster a sense of egalitarian camaraderie among working-class and upper-class members alike. The elite core of the Blackshirts lived communally in specialised party barracks, most notably the "Black House" on King's Road in Chelsea. Here, members engaged in rigorous physical conditioning, training, and boxing lessons to prepare for violent confrontation with political opposition.

== Organisation and structure ==
The Blackshirts were organised as a strict, centralised military hierarchy designed to project discipline and operational efficiency. At its peak, the force was structured into the Fascist Defence Force (FDF), which was later reorganised into "I Corps". The paramilitary structure separated the casual, part-time party members from the devoted full-time members. The devoted elite members were the backbone of Mosley's security.

=== Membership and demographics ===
The social composition of the Blackshirts varied significantly by region, but a significant percentage of the street-level force was recruited from working-class men, particularly those who suffered from long-term unemployment during the Great Depression. In areas like East London and South-West Essex, the BUF successfully drew young, working-class men by offering a sense of purpose, community, and structure that mainstream political parties failed to offer. The leadership structure of the paramilitary wing heavily relied on former military officers from the Great War who were attracted to the group's strict discipline and anti-communist stance.

=== Barracks and "the Blackshirt life" ===
Full-time Blackshirts lived communally in specialised party barracks scattered across major British cities, the most prominent being the "Black House" in London. Members paid a small fee and were provided with rations and free uniforms. Daily life as a Blackshirt living in the barracks included military drilling, physical training, and intensive boxing lessons meant to optimise the member's hand-to-hand combat skills during street confrontations. The barracks also functioned as a nerve centre for the party's propaganda distribution. Transport vans were loaded with newspapers like The Blackshirt and were dispatched for selling.

== Major rallies, violence, and confrontation ==
The public profile of the Blackshirts was defined by a violent, and aggressive history. They had public clashes with political opponents, and acted aggressively towards disruptors. Despite claiming to be defensive, the Blackshirts were often the aggressors in altercations, and they would deploy offensive tactics to dominate public spaces, intimidate minorities, and suppress anti-fascist resistance.

=== The Olympia Rally (1934) ===
On 7 June 1934, the BUF staged its most violent indoor political rally at the Olympia Exhibition Centre in London. The rally drew an attendance of 12,000 people. The event became a major turning point for the movement due to the extreme brutality that the Blackshirts displayed. When left-wing anti-fascist hecklers tried to interrupt a speech that Sir Oswald Mosley was giving, groups of Blackshirts targeted disruptors and administered prolonged beatings before throwing the hecklers out into the hallway. The violence was witnessed by numerous journalists and members of parliament, leading to widespread condemnation. The backlash which came from this rally severely damaged the reputation of the BUF, causing many middle-class supporters and financial backers to leave the party.

=== The East End campaign and Cable Street (1936) ===
Following the BUF's alienation from mainstream political circles, Mosley and the Blackshirts shifted their operational focus towards London's East End, intentionally exploiting local economic grievances and launching an anti-Semitic propaganda campaign aimed at the region's large Jewish population. Blackshirt detachments marched regularly through Jewish neighbourhoods, shouting provocative slogans and instigating street-level harassment. This strategy culminated on 4 October 1936 in the Battle of Cable Street, when Mosley planned to lead a march of several thousand uniformed Blackshirts through Stepney. In response, a broad coalition of East End residents, Jewish groups, trade unionists, communists, and independent anti-fascists mobilised an estimated 100,000 counter-protesters to block the route. Despite a force of 6,000 Metropolitan Police officers attempting to clear a path for the fascists, the anti-fascist crowds erected barricades and fought police in the streets. To prevent further bloodshed, the Police Commissioner ordered Mosley to abandon the march, forcing the Blackshirts to retreat in a major psychological and political defeat for the BUF.

== Women in the Blackshirts ==
Unlike many continental fascist movements which relegated women to strict domestic roles, the BUF actively recruited women into its paramilitary ranks. Established in 1933 under the initial leadership of Oswald Mosley's mother, Lady Maud Mosley, and later managed by special party organisers, the Women's Section operated as a distinct but integrated component of the Blackshirt vanguard.

=== Uniform and organisation ===
Female Blackshirts wore an adapted version of the party uniform, typically consisting of a black polo-neck sweater or a tailored black blouse, a grey or dark shirt, and a military-style leather belt featuring the BUF badge. The women's paramilitary wing was organised and structured into units mirroring the male command, including specialised propaganda squads, administrative branches, and active stewarding teams. Prominent female figures, such as elite athlete and pilot Mary Allen and fascist ideologue Norah Elam, held high-ranking positions and shaped the group's public image.

=== Roles ===
A significant number of the Women's Section focused on administrative duties, welfare work, and the mass distribution of party literature. Other female Blackshirts were heavily involved in the movement's street-level activism. They frequently participated in marches, acted as aggressive stewards at women-only rallies, and engaged in physical altercations with anti-fascists.

In areas like London's East End, working-class female recruits were vital to the party's regional strategy. They formed neighbourhood networks to spread antisemitic propaganda, organise local boycott campaigns against Jewish businesses, and canvas working-class households to build a community-level base for the movement.

== Dissolution ==
Following the outbreak of the WWII in September 1939, the British Union of Fascists launched a vocal "peace campaign," opposing British military involvement against Nazi Germany. Despite the Public Order Act 1936 stripping the Blackshirts of their uniforms, the remaining core of the paramilitary wing shifted its focus to distributing anti-war propaganda and staging peace rallies, leading British intelligence to viewing the group as a potential "fifth column" capable of aiding a German invasion.

=== Defense Regulation 18B ===
As German forces swept through Western Europe in May of 1940, the British government moved decisively to neutralize domestic fascist networks. Home Secretary Sir John Anderson, amended Defense Regulation 18B, which expanded the emergency powers of the government and allowed the detention of anyone suspected of belonging to organizations subject to foreign influence or control without a trial.

On 23 May 1940, Special Branch Officers arrested Oswald Mosley alongside key paramilitary organizers, including Neil Francis Hawkins and Eric Hamilton Piercy. Over the following weeks, more than 700 rank-and-file Blackshirts and prominent female activists were rounded up and interned in facilities such as HM Prison Brixton and camps on the Isle of Man.

=== Official Proscription ===
With its leadership incarcerated and its operational networks dismantled, the BUF ceased to function as a viable movement. On 10 July 1940, the British government formally proscribed the British Union of Fascists under Defense Regulation 18B (1A), making membership in the organization or the continuation of Blackshirt activities a criminal offense. Most interned Blackshirts remained in custody until 1943 or 1944, effectively marking the permanent end of the pre-war paramilitary movement.
