= Battle of Cable Street =

1936 anti-fascist confrontation in London

- Commemorative plaque on a building at Dock Street close to its junction with Cable Street, which was a scene of fierce fighting
- Date: 4 October 1936
- Location: Tower Hill, Aldgate, Cable Street and other areas of the East End of London. 51.5109°N 0.0521°W
- Caused by: Opposition to a fascist march through East London
- Methods: Demonstrations, riots, counter-protests
- Result: British Union of Fascists members prevented from marching through an area with many Jews.; Public Order Act 1936

Parties
British Union of Fascists: Stewards	Anti-fascists: Communists; CPGB; Socialists; ILP; Jewish People's Council	Metropolitan Police

Lead figures
Oswald Mosley	Limited command and control	Philip Game

Number
3,000	c. 100,000–350,000	6,000–10,000

Casualties
- Injuries: c. 175
- Arrested: c. 150

The Battle of Cable Street was a series of clashes that took place at several locations in the East End of London on Sunday, 4 October 1936.

The British Union of Fascists (BUF), led by Oswald Mosley, announced a march to celebrate the fourth anniversary of their organisation. The BUF had become increasingly antisemitic, so their decision to march through East London, then home to a large Jewish population, rather than close to its headquarters in Westminster, was regarded as a deliberate provocation.

A broad coalition of local representatives was unsuccessful in persuading the Home Secretary to ban the march, so the Independent Labour Party, the Communist Party of Great Britain and the Jewish People's Council Against Fascism and Anti-Semitism rallied large crowds, of mostly politically unaffiliated people, onto the streets in an attempt to block the march.

There was fighting between the BUF and counter-protestors at the fascist muster point at Tower Hill. The Metropolitan Police then clashed with both parties as they separated the factions and established a cordon around the BUF force.

The police attempted to clear a route for the fascists through the Aldgate area, but were frustrated by the crowds. Although resistance to the police around Aldgate was sometimes violent, the defence of the Gardiner's Corner sector of Aldgate, the largest and longest-lasting point of contention, was characterised by determined peaceful resistance.

The police continued their attempt to clear Aldgate, but in light of their difficulties there, also tried to clear an alternative route along narrow Cable Street, where fierce fighting occurred as they attempted to clear barricades erected along the street. Unable to clear a route through either Aldgate or Cable Street, and wishing to avoid continued disorder, the police told Mosley his march through East London could not go ahead, but he was permitted to march to the West End instead.

A large mural depicting the battle was painted on the side of St George's Town Hall to commemorate the event. It stands in Cable Street, about 350 metres (1,150 ft) east of the main barricade that stood by the junction with Christian Street.

== Background ==
=== Mosley makes his name ===
In the November 1918 General Election, the 22-year-old aristocrat Oswald Mosley was elected to the House of Commons as a member of parliament (MP) for the Conservative Party. The Conservatives would be partners in a coalition led by the Liberal Party's wartime prime minister David Lloyd George.

Mosley's interests included promoting a generous accommodation with the republican movement to settle the increasingly intense Irish War of Independence. The government had recruited temporary constables, known as the Black and Tans, to help the Irish police suppress republican violence, but there was outrage when news of their excesses reached Britain, actions in which the government was partly complicit. Mosley (together with a number of other politicians, journalists, bishops and others) denounced them and publicised their acts of brutality. In November 1920, he became a household name after resigning from the Conservative Party in protest at the actions of the Black and Tans, continuing his campaign against them as an independent MP.

In the spring of 1924 Mosley was admitted to the Labour Party, and in 1928 inherited his father's title, becoming 6th Baronet Ancoats. He also acquired the hereditary knighthood that came with it. Mosley obtained a junior ministerial role in Ramsay MacDonald's Labour government in 1929. In February 1930 he proposed a Keynesian policy of tariffs, greater state control of the economy and increased public spending to boost the economy and ease rapidly increasing unemployment and other social problems. This was too radically left-wing for the government, whose economic approach was laissez-faire by comparison.

With the government struggling to cope with the crisis, Mosley hoped to become leader in place of MacDonald. Although very popular with the Labour Party membership, his inter-personal arrogance cost him the necessary support among the parliamentary Labour Party that would have been necessary to become leader. He quit the Labour Party in February 1931 to establish the New Party. He did not have a reputation as an antisemite at this time, and the New Party fielded Jewish candidates and sought to attract Jewish voters. However, the party did create a force of stewards, led by the boxer Ted "Kid" Lewis, a Jew from the East End of London. The force's main purpose was to protect the party's meetings from the regular attacks by Communists, but Mosley looked forward to a time when the stewards could act as a political paramilitary force.

In early 1932, Mosley visited Italian leader Benito Mussolini, Europe's leading fascist, to see Italian fascism in action. Soon after, he wound up the New Party and launched the new British Union of Fascists (BUF) on 4 October 1932.

=== The fascist manifesto ===
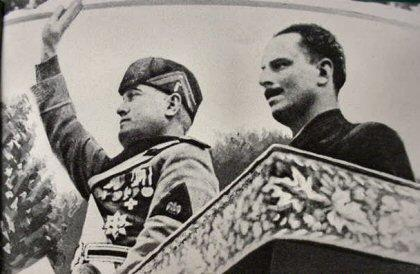
Benito Mussolini and Oswald Mosley. The BUF was funded by Mussolini and also later by Hitler.

The new BUF presented themselves as a party of youthful dynamism, which offered – in contrast to the similarly utopian communists – a patriotic alternative to capitalism.

BUF messaging in the early years included relatively little antisemitic content (Mosley's 1934 book The Greater Britain made no reference to Jews) as Mosley believed Britain's culturally liberal tradition would make this counter-productive. However many senior BUF figures were fiercely antisemitic and over time this would lead to anti-Jewish racism becoming the party's principal pre-occupation.

The initial focus of BUF campaigning was the introduction of a new constitutional and economic framework called the Corporate State. The British principle of parliamentary sovereignty would be replaced by a more technocratic, more autocratic system, which Mosley described in The Greater Britain as a "modern dictatorship". Local government would also be reorganised to ensure it acted in accordance with the will of the executive.

Mosley's long-held views on increased public spending and greater state control of the economy were to be delivered by the Corporate State, which was based on the approach introduced in fascist Italy. The new constitutional processes included a smaller, more powerful executive, to replace the Cabinet system. There would still be a parliament, but its constitutional role would be much diminished.

The economy would be divided into sectors called Corporations, and under a system known as the occupational franchise, voters would be assigned to a Corporation depending on their job. MPs would no longer be elected on the basis of political parties competing in specific geographic areas (constituencies), but based on industrial sectors. Voters would choose from a list of competing industry experts; dockers would vote for dockers, miners for miners, housewives for housewives and so on.

MPs would collaborate with trade unions and business leaders, and with them share responsibility for recommending policy relating to their particular corporation. Mosley promised that the new Corporate State processes would balance the needs of the citizen as a worker and as a consumer, end unemployment and resolve class conflict.

=== The BUF, 1932–1934 ===
Many establishment figures were sympathetic to Mosley at this stage, including press baron Viscount Rothermere, who used his outlets (including the Daily Mail and Daily Mirror) to promote the BUF; this included his front page editorial "Hurrah for the Blackshirts" headline in January 1934. Rothermere's publicity made the BUF fashionable and helped increase its membership to around 40,000–50,000 in mid-1934. In its early days the party insisted it was not antisemitic, but antisemitism crept in, especially during 1934.

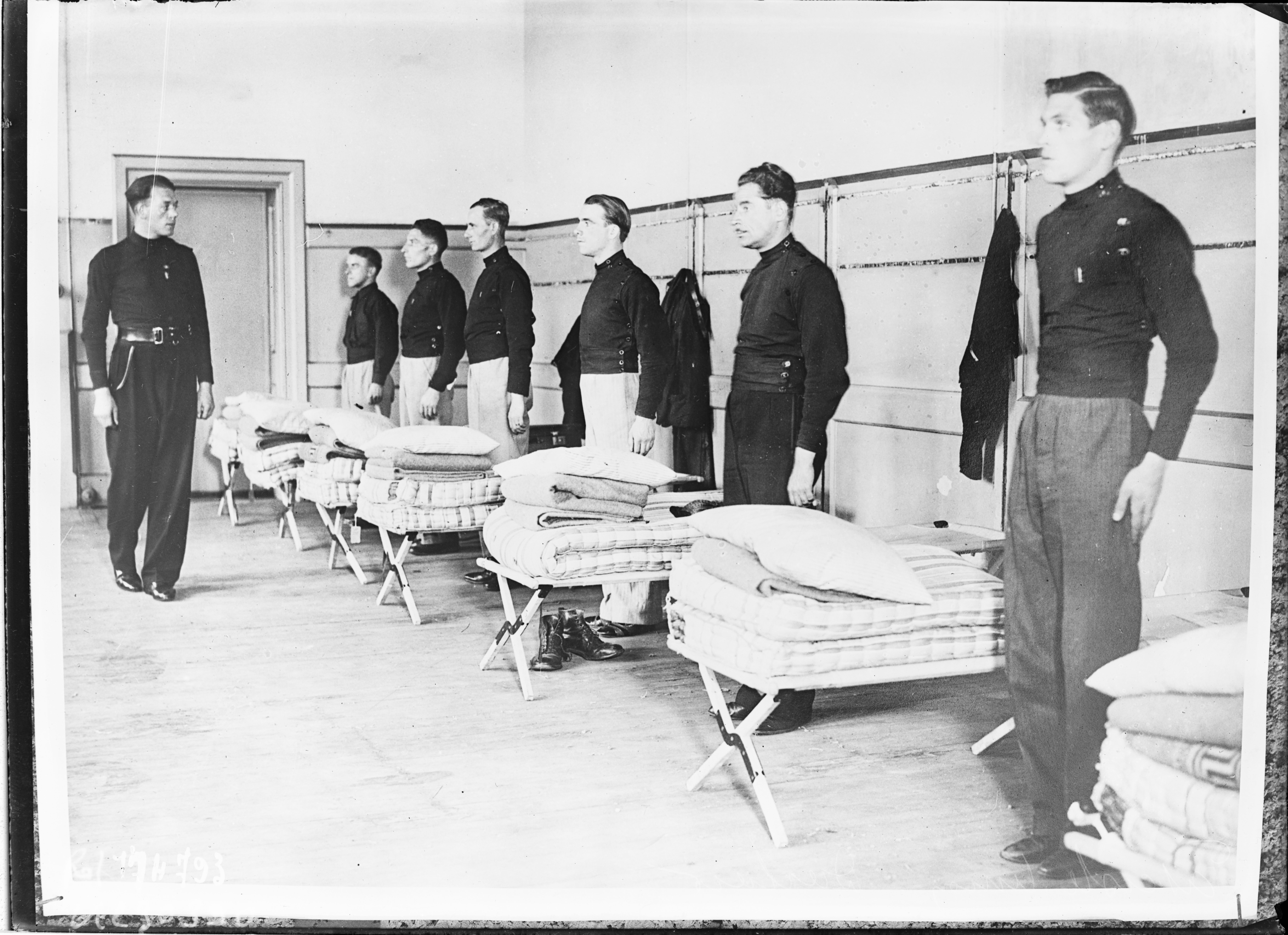
Black House in Chelsea was the barracks of the Fascist Defence Force, and for a time the BUF HQ.

The BUF maintained the paid paramilitary Fascist Defence Force (FDF), ostensibly to defend its many public meetings from disruption by its opponents. The force, initially 300-strong – but subsequently growing – was based at Black House, in King's Road, Chelsea. The FDF had a fleet of thirty vehicles, including five armoured transports, each capable of quickly moving twenty people around the country.

The BUF's fashionable status meant large numbers; establishment figures attended the BUF "Nuremberg-style" rallies across the UK. The broad appeal turned to fear and disgust, when, at the Olympia rally in West London, Mosley would pause during his long and sometimes antisemitic speech to give Blackshirt stewards the opportunity to assault and eject both male and female hecklers. Spotlights were turned on the heckler as the stewards subjected them to sometimes sustained beatings, in the full view of large numbers of people; others were attacked with weapons (including knuckledusters and rubber coshes) out of sight in the arena corridors. The impact on public opinion was compounded when the infamous Night of the Long Knives purge occurred in Germany shortly after.

The violence and antisemitism caused a backlash. Rothermere withdrew his support, venues and advertising slots became hard to book, and membership crashed (to around 5,000 in 1935). As a result of this setback Mussolini reduced his funding – though Hitler would subsequently also come to fund the movement. Mosley resolved to rebuild the party, and decided on a much more overtly antisemitic approach. While the BUF would remain very much a nation-wide movement, it would concentrate much of its resources on areas with the largest Jewish populations: East London, Leeds and Manchester.

=== London's Jews ===
The East End had been the centre of Jewish life in Britain since Oliver Cromwell allowed Jews to resettle in the country in the 1650s. The penultimate (the last coming in the 1930's) and largest cohort of Jewish migration occurred at the end of the 19th century when 150,000 Yiddish speaking Jews came to the UK, to escape persecution in the Russian Empire. Most came to the East End, arriving at Irongate Wharf (adjacent to the Tower of London and St Katherine Docks) and via the port of Harwich in Essex, and then by train to Liverpool Street Station.

In 1936 there were around 330,000 Jews in the UK, amounting to around 0.7% of the population, but growing due to refugees (many of them young children) arriving in the country from Nazi Germany. Between a third and a half of British Jews lived in East London. In 1896 this proportion had been far higher, but slum clearance had led many Jews and non-Jews to leave the inner East End. This reduction in population of the most crowded areas was reinforced by restrictions on further immigration.

Jewish settlement in East London was focused on an arc in and around Whitechapel, extending from Bishopsgate to Cable Street. The area was chosen because of its cheap rents and the independent trades. This area took in large parts of the Metropolitan Borough of Stepney, the south-west of Bethnal Green and the eastern fringe of the City of London. The population of the Borough of Stepney was around 43% Jewish.

Progress on integration had been significant but uneven. Many Jews worked in textiles, furniture and fur trades. Relatively few worked in engineering, dockyards or heavy industry. Some of the older people still spoke Yiddish.

The social and economic integration of Jews had been a factor in the degree of outmigration from the crowded inner East End to more suburban areas or East, West and North London. The more prosperous and better-connected Jews in West and North London came to dominate the Board of Deputies of British Jews and the closely linked Jewish Chronicle. The Board and the Chronicle would come to be regarded as out of touch by many East London Jews, especially when Mosley began his campaign of antisemitism. This led to the creation of many local Jewish organisations and the Jewish Peoples Council umbrella group.

=== The BUF in East London, 1934–1936 ===
One of the BUFs main campaign targets was the East End of London, which, even before the depression, was one of the very poorest parts of the country; badly affected by chronic unemployment, low paid and casualised work, landlordism and poor housing. The impact of this hardship went beyond the material. Father John Groser of Watney Street church (later destroyed in the Blitz), a respected local anti-fascist, described the psychological damage: "In addition to physical depression and ill health, there is clear evidence of the frustration of the personality, the loss of proper self-respect and the creation of an embittered and hopeless section of the community".

These factors made the East End a logical campaigning location for political parties offering an alternative to laissez-faire economic liberalism, and the BUF campaigned hard on the issues of jobs and housing. East London had a further attraction for the BUF in that it was home to the largest concentration of English Jews, people that they would scapegoat for society's ills; Jews were cast as both exploitative capitalists and dangerous communists, loyal to the Soviet Union. The BUF poured resources into East London. Continental funding meant that unlike other parties, it was able to appoint a full-time paid administrator into every branch, co-ordinating activities such as publicity, physical training, general administration and political and social events.

The BUF sought to appeal to the two main non-Jewish sections of East London society, those of Protestant background (of mixed English, Scottish, Huguenot and other ancestry), and those of Catholic background (of mostly Irish ancestry). (Note: There had been a degree of Irish migration to the East End since at least the 1400's. By 1597 the level of Irish migration to western Wapping and surrounding areas was such that western Cable Street and the surrounding area went by the Gaelic name 'Knockfergus', a name that remained in use for 200 years. Rates of migration varied over the centuries, remaining high through the 19th century. By 1900 one of the main concentrations of Irish population in East London was eastern Wapping and Shadwell (including eastern Cable Street). There would later be far fewer Irish arrivals the inner East End, due to changes in migration patterns, with Irish migration to London switching to parts of the capital with better employment prospects (such as Dagenham in outer East London and around Park Royal in West London). Consequently, by the middle of the twentieth century, the last significant wave of Irish newcomers to the East End would, apart from religious distinctions, be largely assimilated into the general population. In 1951 the proportion of first-generation, Irish-born residents in the Metropolitan Borough of Stepney had reduced to 1.8%.) They had a degree of success in attracting recruits from both groups, especially among the very young. The first branch in the area, at Bow, opened in October 1934 with others following with varying levels of success. The more successful branches included Shoreditch and Bethnal Green but the BUF struggled in areas such as Poplar and West Ham where the railway industries, large factories and dockyards lent themselves to a unionised workforce, and the alternative political focus that provided.

As well as the unions, others countered the Fascist view of society. Churchmen such as John Groser understood that the economic and social isolation of the East End was such (the author Walter Besant wrote that the isolation was so deep that East London ought to be considered a distinct city in its own right) that most East Londoners knew little of life outside the area, and this made them vulnerable to BUF propaganda. Groser would point out that while some bad employers and bad landlords in East London were Jewish, that this was not representative – the problem was nationwide and outside East London very few of the employers and landlords were Jewish.

Social cohesion was damaged by the arrival and activities of the BUF, with Jews being frequently insulted, intimidated and assaulted.

Mosley did have a measure of success, because whereas before his activities, relationships throughout the whole district were very easy, we took Jewish differences for granted and they took our differences for granted.

After Mosley one became very conscious one was speaking to a Jew; that the Jews were, very naturally, on the outlook for signs of disapproval, of antisemitism, wherever they could see them, and detected them even in the minds of their most ardent well-wishers, it became not quite a normal relationship. That was what Mosley did.

— Edith Ramsay, educator and community worker.

While the BUF is best remembered for its antisemitism, many working-class people were attracted by its rejection of laissez faire liberal economics, some of Catholic background would join in response to the mass murder of priests, nuns and other clergy by the leftist Republican government in Spain. Some women, including prominent former suffragettes were attracted by their policies around improved employment protection, and other rights for women – and many others, especially women, by Mosley's policy of preserving peace by avoiding war with Germany and its allies. Members would speak of the sense of belonging and purpose that being in the BUF gave them.

== Prelude ==
=== BUF announce march ===
On 26 September 1936, the British Union of Fascists (BUF) advertised a march to take place the following weekend, on Sunday 4 October, the fourth anniversary of their organisation. Thousands of BUF followers, dressed in their Blackshirt uniform, were to march through the heart of the East End. The BUF had been founded in Chelsea and was headquartered in Westminster, so the decision to celebrate their anniversary with a march in East London, an area that then had a large Jewish population, rather than at their West London HQ was seen as an intentional provocation.

The BUF planned to march from Tower Hill and divide into four columns, each heading for one of four open-air public meetings where Mosley and other speakers would address gatherings of BUF supporters. The meetings were to be at Limehouse, Bow, Bethnal Green and Hoxton.

=== Calls for a ban ===
The Jewish People's Council organised a petition calling for the march to be banned, which gathered the signatures of 100,000 people, including the Mayors of the five East London Boroughs (Hackney, Shoreditch, Stepney, Bethnal Green and Poplar) in two days.

We, the undersigned citizens of East London, view with grave concern the proposed march of the British Union of Fascists upon East London. The avowed object of the Fascist movement in Great Britain is the incitement of malice and hatred against sections of the population.

It aims to further ends which seek to destroy the harmony and goodwill which have existed for centuries among the East London population, irrespective of differences in race and creed...

We therefore make an earnest appeal to His Majesty's Secretary of State for Home Affairs, to prohibit such marches and thus retain peaceable and amicable relations between all sections of East London's population.

— Petition to the Home Secretary, John Simon.

On 1 October 1936, the five East London mayors, led by Helena Roberts, the Mayor of Stepney, visited the Home Office, and had a one hour meeting in which they expressed their fear at the consequences of the march. But despite the Home Secretary John Simon's known opposition to the BUF political approach "this dressing up in fancy uniforms and this aping of military organisation for political purposes", the Home Office did not agree to ban the march.

The following day, 2 October 1936, The petition was presented to the Home Office by representatives of a broad coalition of local groups:

- Jack Pearce and other representatives of the Jewish Peoples Council (JPC)
- James Hall MP: Labour MP for Whitechapel and St Georges
- Alfred Wall: Trade Unionist, Secretary of the London Trades Council
- Father John Groser: Anglican Priest at Christ Church on Watney Street, Wapping, and prominent member of the Independent Labour Party (ILP)

Jack Pearce of the JPC recounted that the delegation was courteously received by a senior Home Office official, but advised that the Home Secretary could not, or would not intervene.

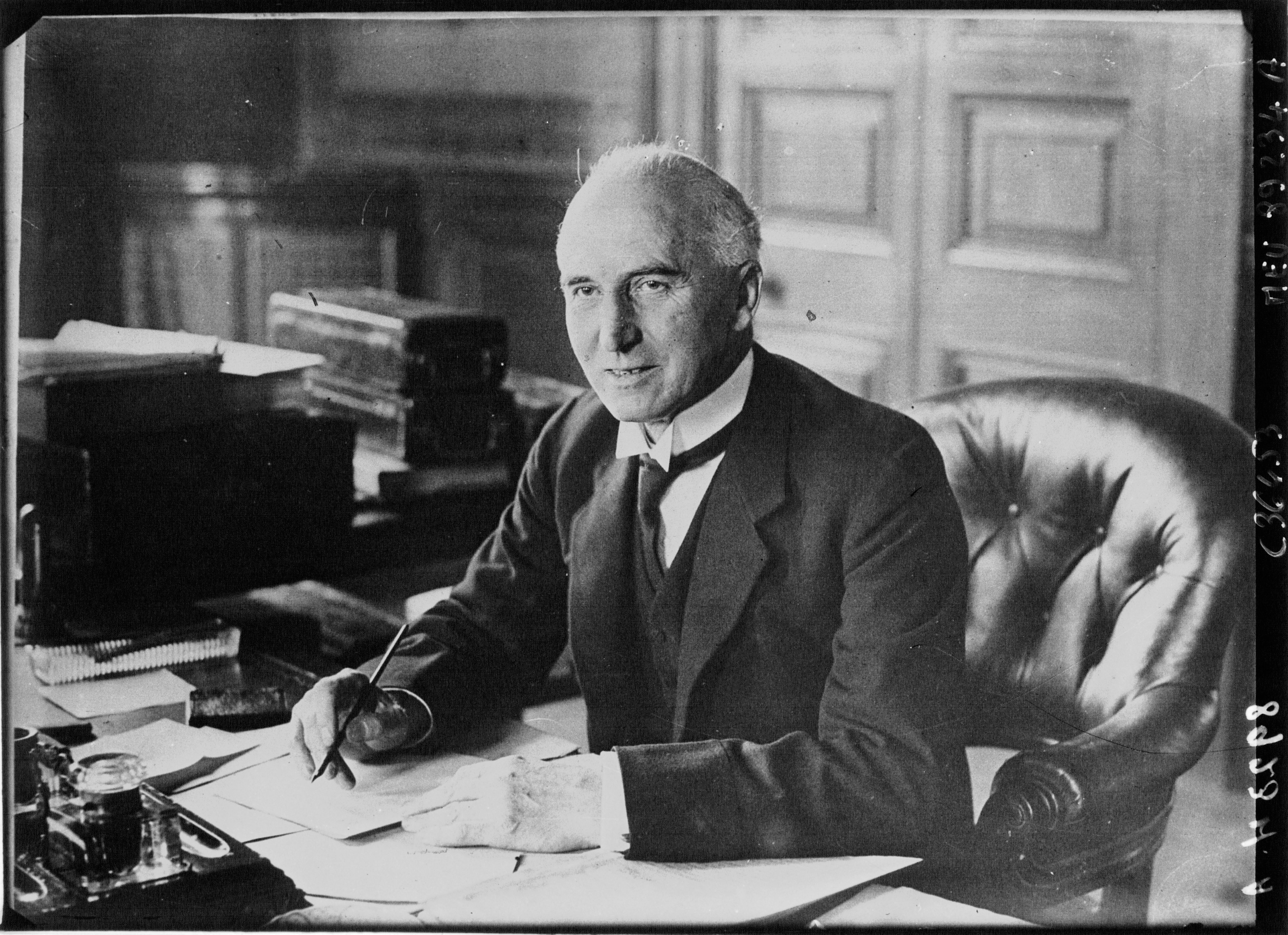
The Home Secretary, Sir John Simon, declined requests to ban the BUF march.

=== Counter-rally prepared ===
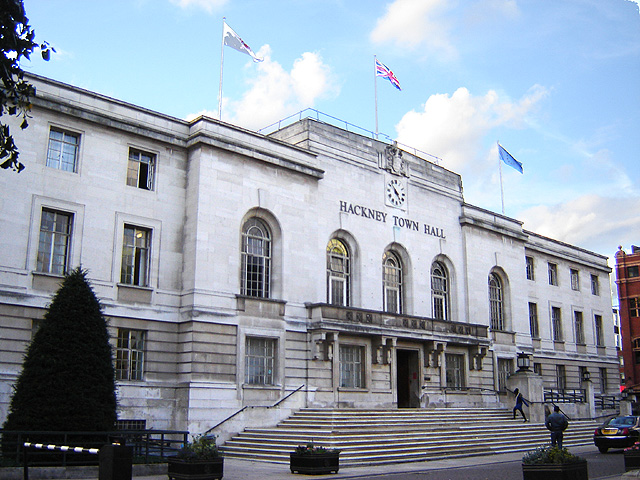
At Hackney Town Hall, ILP members resolved to challenge the Home Secretary with a telegram stating that the consequences of the march would be his responsibility.

Although disappointed by the decision not to ban the march, the Labour Party and the Board of Deputies of British Jews (an organisation dominated by deputies from outside East London) decided to oppose any counter-demonstrations. In addition, newspapers supportive of Labour and the Board, such as the Daily Herald, News Chronicle and Jewish Chronicle, ran editorials urging people to stay away from any counter-demonstration.

The Communist Party of Great Britain also initially opposed direct action; like the Labour Party and the Board of Deputies, they were worried about being portrayed as hooligans. The communists had a further complication in having arranged another event: a rally at Trafalgar Square in the West End on the same day to demonstrate support for Spain's Republican government, an event to which they gave priority. Under pressure from East End branches of their party, they did compromise and organised an event at Shoreditch Town Hall for the evening, after Mosley's march and after their West End event had taken place.

The Independent Labour Party favoured a counter-rally from the outset, and on the evening of Thursday 1 October, having hired loudspeakers, they took a van round the streets of East London calling on the people to take to the streets on Sunday to block the entry points to the East End. The Evening Standard reported on their call for action, and through the headline "Big ILP counter-rally" on billboards across the London area, inadvertently amplified the ILP's message. At a meeting at Hackney Town Hall on Friday, the ILP went further and resolved to telegram the Home Secretary telling him that any adverse consequences of the march would be his responsibility.

Having organised the petition, the Jewish People's Council distributed hundreds of thousands of leaflets insisting the march must not take place, and in so doing implicitly encouraging people onto the streets. One of their members, the mainly Jewish "Ex-Servicemen's Movement Against Fascism" already intended an anti-fascist march on Sunday 4 October but were denied permission for the event on the basis that the BUF had organised their march first. They supported the calls for a counter rally and resolved to march through the East End despite having been denied permission.

Late on Wednesday night the Communist Party, under continued pressure from East End branches, changed position and agreed to cancel the Trafalgar Square event and counter-protest against Mosley in the East End instead. On Thursday, thousands of leaflets advertising the Trafalgar Square event were overprinted with the legend "Alteration! Rally to Aldgate. 2PM". On Friday, their Daily Worker newspaper, which carried the party's influence well beyond its limited membership (Note: The Stepney branch had 100 members in 1934, growing in response to the arrival of the BUF, and then more markedly as a result of the local communist role in the Stepney Tenants Defence League. The branch had grown to 500 members in 1939) included a front-page article urging readers to attend the counter-protest.

The Fascists had hitherto dressed in mostly black uniforms of civilian style. Mosley prepared for the landmark event by procuring a new military style uniform, of his own design, for himself and his senior officers. The uniform included a black military peaked cap, a red armband, a black military cut jacket, grey riding breeches and jackboots. His opponents viewed the march in the context of the successful aggressions carried out by the fascists and nationalists of Spain, Germany, Italy and Japan. They prepared their resistance under the slogan "They shall not pass", a war-cry used in France's critical defence of Verdun against the Germans in 1916, and which was being used at the same time in the Republican Spanish government's defence of Madrid against Francisco Franco.

== Field of operations ==
A legacy of the long-ago demolished London Wall is that there are just three main routes into the East End from the direction of the City of London. From north to south, these are: Bishopsgate, Aldgate (450 metres south-east of Bishopsgate) and Tower Hill (450 metres south of Aldgate). The BUF was to gather its supporters at the southernmost of these three entrances, at Tower Hill and adjacent Royal Mint Street in East Smithfield, at 2:30.

The intention was that Mosley would formally review the assembled force, after which it would march from Tower Hill and divide into four columns, each heading for one of four open-air public meetings where Mosley and other speakers, including William Joyce, John Beckett, Tommy Moran and Alexander Raven Thomson, would address gatherings of BUF supporters:

- Salmon Lane, Limehouse, at 5 pm
- Stafford Road, Bow, at 6 pm
- Victoria Park Square, Bethnal Green, at 6 pm
- Aske Street, in the Hoxton area of Shoreditch, at 6:30 pm

In response their opponents, who knew of the intended meetings but not the intended routes from Tower Hill, called on the public to assemble at key points:

- Leman Street and Aldgate – Anti-fascists considered Leman Street to Aldgate, the logical route for the BUF to take, with the force then expected to divide into smaller columns after reaching the junctions there.
- Cable Street – Considered challenging for the BUF, as it was then a narrow street, overlooked by homes.
- St George's Street (now known as The Highway) – This was considered an even harder route for the BUF and the Police did not attempt to clear it.

The main mass of anti-fascist protesters would gather at Aldgate, the central of East End's three entry points, for 2 pm. In doing this the crowd could occupy the important road junctions in that area, including Gardiner's Corner, the junction of Whitechapel High Street with Leman Street, Commercial Street and Commercial Road. (The junction of Commercial Road and Whitechapel High Street has since moved east by 100 metres.)

The counter-protesters had reserves positioned in a number of locations, including Brick Lane and Commercial Street, ready to create obstructions and offer resistance should the Police and BUF attempt passage. Thousands more waited in the side streets leading to Limehouse. In addition, the Communists sent groups of men to attempt to seize some or all of the speaking platforms that the BUF intended to use later in the day.

The aim of the police was to allow the march to proceed, but as peacefully as possible. The head of the Metropolitan Police, Philip Game, established his HQ at the junction of Mansell and Royal Mint Streets by Tower Hill. There was also a major police station halfway along Leman Street, between Tower Hill and Aldgate.

== Numbers involved ==
Very large numbers of people took part in the events, in part due to the good weather, but estimates of the numbers of participants vary enormously:

- Estimates of Fascist participants range from 2,000 to 3,000, up to 5,000. This included units of black-bloused female fascists, totalling up to around 400, youth cadets and a small contingent from Germany. Fascists arrived by coach, Fascist Defence Force armoured vehicles and by public transport.
- There were 6,000–10,000 policemen, including the whole of the Metropolitan Police Mounted Division. The police had wireless vans and a spotter plane sending updates on crowd numbers and movements to Philip Game's HQ, at Tower Hill. The police were able to deploy reinforcements at some of the key points by tram, coach and bus.
- Estimates of the number of anti-fascist counter-demonstrators range from 100,000 to 150,000, 250,000, 300,000, 310,000, 350,000 and up to 500,000.

Around 500 volunteer St John Ambulance staff were on duty, and the Independent Labour Party and Communists, like the Fascists, set up medical stations to treat their injured. The more seriously hurt were taken to St George's Hospital in Wapping, St Peter's Hospital in Bethnal Green (both later destroyed during the Blitz) and the London Hospital in Whitechapel.

== Events ==
=== Tower Hill ===
The fascists were to gather from all over the country, at and around Tower Hill for 2:30 pm; the first to arrive did so in a piecemeal fashion from around 1:25 pm; and were vulnerable to groups of hostile local people, around 500 in total, waiting for them. A party entering Tower Hill from nearby Mark Lane tube station was attacked, as was a group in Mansell Street. The anti-fascists also temporarily occupied the Minories.

The fighting intensified as more BUF members entered the East End, including elements of the elite Fascist Defence Force arriving at Tower Hill in armoured transport vehicles; with sides reinforced by plate armour, and windows covered with iron grilles. A private car bearing the slogan "Mosley shall not pass" drove onto Royal Mint Street, veering through the melee. It was attacked by Fascists who police cleared away with a baton charge, the car making its escape. The casualties in this stage of fighting included Tommy Moran, who was leading the BUF force until Mosley's later arrival. Moran resumed command after receiving first aid.

At 2pm, the fighting took on a three-way character as police began the process of separating the factions. During this fighting the Police attacked and were attacked by both fascists and anti-fascists.

After separating the factions, there was then fierce fighting as police then moved to clear counter-protesters from the crossroads where Royal Mint Street, Leman Street, Dock Street and Cable Street meet. The counter-protesters were moved onto these neighbouring streets, including a large number forced into Dock Street.

=== Aldgate and its approaches ===
The largest confrontation took place around Aldgate, where the conflict was between those seeking to block the BUF march, and the Metropolitan Police who were trying to clear a route for the march to proceed along. The public were requested to gather in the area at 2 pm, but large numbers were already present by mid-morning. Attempts to clear Gardiner's Corner began in late morning.

Despite having had permission to march denied to them, a column of the 'Ex-Servicemen's Movement Against Fascism', wearing their Great War medals and carrying their British Legion standard before them, had spent the morning marching round the district to advertise the counter-protest. At 11:30, they were passing along Whitechapel Road when they found their way blocked by a cordon of police at the New Road junction, half a mile east of their destination at Gardiners Corner. They demanded the right to march in their own borough, the same right granted the incoming fascists. Fighting broke out, they were attacked by mounted police, and there was a battle for the standard. The police eventually captured the standard, tore it to pieces and smashed the flag pole to pieces in front of the eyes of the ex-Servicemen.

The streets around Aldgate were broad, and impossible to effectively barricade except by blocking them with large crowds of determined people. Several tram routes went through Gardiner's Corner, and efforts to hold the junction were helped when a number of tram cars, perhaps four, were abandoned in the road by their drivers, possibly deliberately. These abandoned vehicles would assist the counter-protesters by breaking up mounted police charges. The police would also be hampered by workings at Aldgate East tube station (and other and nearby stations) which blocked half the width of the adjacent part of the roadway.

Dense crowds gathered from Aldgate Pump, along Aldgate High Street and Whitechapel High Street to St Mary Matfelon Church and beyond, along Whitechapel Road and Mile End Road, extending around a mile in total, with crowds also extending some distance along Commercial Road, blocking the main route to Limehouse. Jewish Chronicle reporters observed very large numbers of Jewish people among the crowd (despite the newspaper having urged readers to stay away) and heartened to see a far greater number of non-Jews, who came out in communal solidarity with their neighbours.

Helena Roberts, the Mayor of Stepney observed "I have never seen the people of the East End so thoroughly roused and angry. Every avenue to the Aldgate was blocked by huge crowds of people – Christian and Jew." The greatest concentration of people was at Gardiner's Corner, the junction of Whitechapel High Street with Leman Street, Commercial Street and Commercial Road.

By 1:30 Aldgate, and in particular Gardiner's Corner, was solidly blocked by a mass of people who had already endured a series of baton and mounted charges by police. The Police would charge, clear part of the area, only for the protestors to pour back in again. Although the defence of the Aldgate area would include violence, the largest and longest lasting point of contention, at Gardiner's Corner, was characterised by peaceful passive resistance. ILP chair Fenner Brockway who was Gardiner's Corner for several hours observed "I was at Aldgate from 2 o'clock to 4:30, during the whole time I only saw one apple thrown, and I was in the thick of the fray". Surges of people trying to avoid police charges were pressed against plate glass windows of the Gardiners Corner shops, a number of men and women were injured as the windows of these shops broke under their weight.

The police continued to try to secure a route through Gardiner's Corner, but also tried to secure alternative routes that the BUF marchers might resort to instead. At around 1:40 pm, a large group of protestors broke off from the main body and headed into the Minories which leads to Tower Hill. At around 2:15 pm, individuals were making their way through periphery of the crowds at Aldgate, including at Commercial Road shouting "All to Cable Street", encouraging people to join the defence of the Cable Street/Leman Street junction near Tower Hill. Some made their way directly to the crossroads, among them a large group of the Ex-Servicemen who had fought with the police during the morning. Others made their way to Cable Street by side roads. The number of people who could move in this way was limited by the density and physical extent of the crowds occupying the space between Aldgate and Cable Street

The Police secured the crossroads after bitter fighting, with some defenders retreating up Leman Street, and some - about 700 - retreating into Cable Street. Some of those who fell back into Cable Street armed themselves with material from a barricade. The police then sought to clear both Cable Street and Leman Street.

Although some counter-protesters had headed to Cable Street, large numbers remained around Aldgate and its approaches. The police successfully fought to clear a route along two parallel avenues of approach, Minories and Leman Street, that lay between Tower Hill and Aldgate. The Fire Brigade were ordered to turn fire hoses on protestors to help clear the side streets. Despite passive and active resistance (including the use of marbles and bursting bags of pepper to hinder police horses), the police methodically advanced along each of the avenues and secured them by setting cordons of foot police along the side streets. They also continued their attempts to clear Aldgate itself, but the crowd remained solidly packed, chanting: "They shall not pass."

Fenner Brockway decided to try to contact the Home Secretary, John Simon. Just after 3pm, Brockway found a phone box on Whitechapel Road and called the Home Office; the Home Secretary was not available so Brockway apprised a civil servant of the serious ongoing violence:

There are a quarter of a million people here, they are peaceful and unarmed, but they are determined that Mosley's provocative march shall not pass. If you permit it, yours will be the responsibility for the serious consequences

— Fenner Brockway, Secretary of the Independent Labour Party

The official assured Brockway the message would be passed on. It is not known whether this actually happened, or whether it contributed to the decision by the authorities, soon after, to ban the march.

As the afternoon progressed, and with the Minories cleared, the Police tried to clear a route through the western flank of the counter-protesters, who were located on Aldgate High Street in the vicinity of St Botolph's Aldgate. They aimed to clear a route through to Houndsditch and beyond. This would allow the BUF marchers to reach their rally points via the Bishopsgate Without neighbourhood. This action was known as the Battle of Aldgate Pump, and the Police's failure to clear a route may have been partly because of casualties they suffered. As eight coachloads of police reinforcements arrived on the scene, stones were thrown and the windows of two coaches were broken.

=== Cable Street sector ===
Protesters built around eight barricades on narrow Cable Street and its side streets. Two were built on Cable Street itself, with materials for a third prepared in readiness.

- The first, made of materials taken from a nearby builders yard, was placed 170 metres along Cable Street immediately east of its junction with Shorter Street (now called Fletcher Street), in the St George in the East area of Wapping.
- A second Cable Street barricade was placed by the junction with Christian Street, about 130 metres east of the first barricade. This second barricade was formed by an overturned lorry reinforced by other materials.

The six barricades on side streets included one at Wellclose Square, in close proximity to the first Cable Street barricade.

There was also a barrier on Back Church Lane (a side street leading toward the Aldgate area); the Back Church Lane barrier was erected under the railway bridge, just north of the junction with Cable Street. Others were described as blocking the route south, towards the Thames.

Defenders at the barricades received reinforcements from several directions, including; from Aldgate via Commercial Road and the side streets, from those forced into Cable Street after fighting around Tower Hill and at the crossroads at Cable Street's western end. and from groups coming from the eastern end of Cable Street (eastern Wapping and Shadwell).

The 'Battle of Wellclose Square' began when Police found the Wellclose Square barricade undefended. They began to dismantle it but came under attack, and retreated. The Police returned in greater numbers and cleared the square with protesters retreating in the direction of St George's Street (Now known as 'The Highway').

The police also took the first Cable Street barricade (at the Cable Street\Shorter Street junction) and dismantled it, but several policemen surrendered in the fighting, were held in empty shops and had their helmets and truncheons taken from them as souvenirs, before being released by their captors

Continued police attempts to take and remove the barricades were resisted in hand-to-hand fighting and also by missiles, including rubbish, rotten vegetables and the contents of chamber pots thrown at the police by women in houses along the street. At Cable Street, as elsewhere, children's marbles were also used to counter charges by mounted police.

=== Decision at Tower Hill ===
Mosley arrived in an open-topped black Bentley sports car, escorted by Blackshirt motorcyclists, at 3:30pm. By that point, with the exception of a crowd in Dock Street contained by a police cordon, and people at the upper windows of some of the buildings, the area had been cleared of counter-protesters. As Mosley's car turned right from Leman Street into Royal Mint Street some counter-protesters threw objects at the car.

By this time, his force had formed up in Royal Mint Street and neighbouring streets into a column nearly half a mile long, and was ready to proceed, however the police had failed to clear a path for them to march along.

On his arrival, a police officer summoned Mosley to Sir Philip Game's HQ at the junction of Mansell Street and Royal Mint Street. Game told Mosley that if he proceeded with his march and meetings that serious disorder was certain and that the march could therefore not go ahead. He was told that he could march to the West End, and if he wished hold a meeting in Hyde Park instead. Mosley said that he would consult with his 'officers'. Mosley had a long debrief with officers, including Staff Officer Moran, his second in command on the day.

On hearing the news there were boos and shouts of "We want free speech" from the angry Fascists, who sang the fascist songs "Up the Blackshirts" and the Nazi Horst-Wessel-Lied. At around 3:40 Mosley told the head of the Mounted Police, Major G.H.B. De Chair, that they would not hold a meeting in Hyde Park after their march west.

Mosley came back to Game to request to be able to walk up and down the line to review his followers. Game assented but said he wanted the Fascists to move off as soon as possible afterwards, as his officers had been holding the crowds back for a long time. Mosley drove along the line one way, and walked the other, taking photo opportunities and receiving salutes and cheers from one section of Fascists after another.

When news of Game's decision reached Gardiner's Corner, 450 metres away, the tension suddenly lifted: "The police strolled casually away from the crowds they had been holding back. As casually, the crowds followed them. In a moment, there was just a sea of friendly humanity." Reporters described how protesters who withstood four baton charges in the previous half an hour, shared cigarettes and lemonade with police officers. As Mosley was leaving Tower Hill, the crowds celebrated his defeat by mockingly singing The Grand Old Duke of York.

=== Arrests and injuries ===
About 150 demonstrators were arrested, with the majority of them being anti-fascists, although some escaped with the help of other demonstrators. To prevent the arrested being freed, the police found it necessary for up to ten officers to escort each prisoner back to the Police Station. This created challenges for the police as these officers were removed from the front-line cordons for extended periods. Some witnesses expressed the view that the police stopped arresting people for this reason.

Many of the arrested demonstrators reported harsh treatment at the hands of the police. The behaviour of police officers varied considerably, with some showing restraint and courtesy, while others lost their heads and lashed out wildly.

Around 175 people were injured, including police, women and children (the casualty figures exclude those treated solely at the ILP, CPGB and BUF medical stations).

== March to the West End ==
Around 4:00, the Fascist column, interspersed with its marching bands, turned, left the East End and headed west. The column marched through the deserted streets of the City of London business district, preceded by around fifteen mounted Police. The route taken was via Byward Street, Great Tower Street, Eastcheap, down Queen Victoria Street and onto the Victoria Embankment on the edge of the West End.

The head of the column reached Somerset House on the Embankment at 4:30, and many dispersed via Temple tube station. Others continued with Mosley to the BUF HQ at Westminster.

The march had been shadowed on parallel routes by anti-fascists, and when the BUF neared Westminster Bridge, scuffles broke out as large crowds came down from the Strand and other directions to confront them. Many of the Police had been dismissed by this time, but scores rushed back so that within a few minutes relative calm was restored.

As the Fascists continued west, they spat at and insulted passers by that they judged to be Jewish. There were also antisemitic songs about the Home Secretary, Sir John Simon, who they mistakenly believed to be a Jew. The Blackshirts arrived at the BUF HQ at Great Smith Street, Westminster. Mosley appeared at an upper window, to be greeted by cheers and fascist salutes. After he delivered a speech there, around 400 fascists proceeded to Trafalgar Square, where, at around 5:30 announced they wanted to hold a meeting, however the Police told them that would not be permitted as it was past sunset. The refusal led to fighting and disorder at Trafalgar Square and on the Strand, with six blackshirts arrested.

== Evening in the East End ==
There was elation and relief in the East End, with parties in the street and pubs and cafes full of people exchanging news and experiences. On the evening of Mosley's defeat anti-fascists held a number of pre-organised and impromptu political meetings. The fascists had organised four public meetings, but Mosley and his marchers never reached them, leaving BUF supporters greatly outnumbered by their jubilant opponents at each of the venues.

=== Limehouse ===
Mosley's columns were expected at the meeting at Salmon Lane, in Limehouse, at around 5pm. As this time approached a speaker addressed a crowd who could not be heard except in the very front rows due to the heckling of the counter-protesters who surged forward against the Police cordon surrounding the speakers. This confrontation was characterised by reporters as mostly good natured.

As 5 o'clock approached, the Police cordon was sagging under the pressure of a growing crowd. Mounted Police who had been waiting in reserve then advanced carefully through the crowds to the speaker so he could be removed under police protection. The Mounted Police then made their way through the crowd, who were unaware of events at Tower Hill, calling "All over, there will be no march, you can go home".

=== Bow ===
Around 100-200 people waited in vain for Mosley, for several hours, at the junction of Stafford Road and Roman Road in Bow. He had been expected at around 6pm.

=== Bethnal Green ===
Mosley had been expected at around 6pm, but plans for a meeting were foiled by a handpicked group of men led by the communist 'Tiny' Brooks (who was 6'4" and a half). They had seized Victoria Park Gardens in Bethnal Green at 7am, intending to prevent Mosley from speaking there. Following the cancellation of the march, thousands of leaflets were distributed, calling for counter-protestors at the 'front' to make their way to Victoria Park Gardens to link up with Brooks and to attend a victory rally there.

=== Shoreditch ===
The Fascists had organised a meeting at the junction of Aske Street and Pitfield Street, where Mosley was scheduled to speak around 6:30. The communists also had a rally organised at Shoreditch Town Hall, an event they had initially scheduled as an alternative to counter-protest, in the period before they decided to take part. Shoreditch Town Hall was packed so loudspeakers were placed in nearby Hoxton Square so that speeches could be heard by an overflow crowd.

The presence of both sides in a small area led the deployment of very large numbers of Police, some of whom escorted the Fascists safely away after their meeting finished.

== Aftermath ==
=== Interpreting events ===
The ILP and Communists made statements celebrating the community's united response, in which East-Enders of all backgrounds – including Jews, Protestants, Catholics and Muslims (from among the Somali seafarers living around Leman Street) – successfully resisted Mosley and his followers.

East London workers supported by all London in united action have barred the road to Mosley. Gentile, Jew, Catholic, Protestant, Labour and Communist, men, women and children determined that Fascism shall not pass here, have given Mosley the most humiliating defeat ever suffered by any figure in English politics.

East London workers have not only defeated Mosley, they have demonstrated that English people have no time for any sort of toleration for Fascism.

East London has torn neutrality to shreds and given a lead to the whole Labour and democratic movement to move into action against Fascism..

— Press Release by the London District of the Communist Party, published in the Daily Mirror.

A frequent tactic of the BUF was to carry out provocations and then portray themselves as a victim when a reaction occurred. The BUF accordingly sought to maximise the publicity from the day's events, portraying their failure to complete the march as a sign of an ineffectual government allowing a dangerous mob to deny their right to free speech.

Brother Blackshirts, Today the government of Britain has surrendered to the Red Terror. Today the government of Britain has surrendered to jewish corruption. The British Union will never surrender. We will never cease this fight until corruption is overthrown and Britain saved. Tomorrow all England will read and learn the necessity for fascism and National Socialism. When they confess they cannot govern it, the country sends for us to govern it…

— Oswald Mosley's speech to supporters at Westminster, Sunday 4th October 1936

=== Mixed impact on the BUF ===
The day after the battle, Mosley flew to Germany to marry his second wife, Diana Guinness, at a ceremony in Joseph Goebbels' drawing room in Berlin. Adolf Hitler was the best man and gifted the couple a signed photograph in a silver frame. The episode caused considerable embarrassment among rank-and-file BUF members.

The Battle was a heavy psychological blow to the BUF and undermined Mosley's authority among senior party figures, leading to resignations, sackings and splits in the months that followed. The BUF also lost prestige with Mussolini and Italian funding began to dry up, leading the BUF to identify more closely with Hitler. As part of this shift, they renamed themselves the "British Union of Fascists and National Socialists".

Conversely however, the Metropolitan Police Special Branch estimated that the BUF experienced a short lived surge in its London membership, which increased by around 2,000 people in the immediate aftermath of the battle – mostly very young men attracted by the prospect of street fighting, rather than people with a strong ideological conviction. The subsequent BUF campaign to preserve peace in Europe through appeasement of German ambitions was significantly more successful and increased membership to around 15,000 member in 1939, though this was only about a third of its membership before the violent Olympia Rally of 1934.

=== Continued BUF activities ===
Despite the setback of 4 October, the BUF continued its activities across the country, including antisemitic attacks in Leeds, Manchester and London. The most serious incident was the Mile End Pogrom, which happened the weekend after the battle when anti-fascists held a victory march ending with a public meeting in Victoria Park, East London. They were confronted by BUF supporters on the route and then in the park. With the anti-fascists and police tied down by the fascists in Victoria Park, 150 fascist teenagers broke off and rampaged down the Mile End Road, smashing the windows of Jewish owned shops, turning over a car and assaulting people they took to be Jews. The attacks included throwing an elderly man and a seven-year-old girl through a plate glass window. The girl lost an eye.

=== Hearts and minds ===
While confrontation continued, some anti-fascists also wanted to engage with and better understand why Mosley's message struck a chord for some ordinary working-class men and women, including trade unionists. Phil Piratin of the CPGB sought, and eventually gained, permission to set up a small CPGB group to join local boxing clubs and engage with young men who had joined the BUF or were attracted to it. In this way relationships were built and Piratin was able to promote his message of working-class solidarity being better than the scapegoating and division of the BUF.

Soon after Piratin's group had opportunities to advocate for tenants of all ethnic and political backgrounds, including BUF members, against unscrupulous landlords who wanted to evict them. The BUF, like the CPGB, emphasised the importance of housing issues to the working class, so some BUF members tore up their BUF membership cards in disgust after their CPGB enemies helped them, when their own party failed to.

This led to Piratin's CPGB colleague Maurice 'Tubby' Rosen, and Father Groser of Watney Street Church, to establish the Stepney Tenants Defence League, which was able to continue this housing protest and empowerment at a much greater scale. The League attracted 11,000 members.

=== Public Order Act, 1936 ===
Sir Philip Game, head of the Metropolitan Police, warned that the BUF had become a much more dangerous movement during 1936. At his recommendation the Public Order Act 1936 outlawed party political "defence corps" and the wearing of political uniforms which Game felt would go some way to reducing some of the BUF's "spectacular appeal to the young and foolish". The Act also required organisers of large meetings and demonstrations to obtain police permission, this was in part due to the practice of the BUF to hold provocative meetings where opposition was virtually guaranteed. Game lobbied for an outright ban on the BUF but the government would not go that far.

=== World War II ===
After the war broke out, the BUF campaigned for a quick armistice, under the slogan "Peace by immediate negotiation with Hitler". The party was banned in May 1940, amid the unfolding crisis of the Battle of France, with Mosley – having anticipated the decision – first destroying all the organisations records. Mosley and his main lieutenants were arrested and interned on the Isle of Man. One notable exception was William Joyce, who had fallen out with Mosley and left the party in 1937. Joyce, who was to have been one of the speakers at the four meetings the BUF planned on 4 October 1936, escaped to Germany days before the war began and served Germany as its chief English-language broadcaster, earning the nickname "Lord Haw-Haw".

During the Battle of Britain, and ahead of the Blitz, Joyce taunted the East End in a radio broadcast boasting "Hardest of all, the Luftwaffe will smash Stepney. I know the East End. Those dirty Jews and Cockneys will run like rabbits into their holes". East London soon experienced months of devastating air raids. Thousands were killed and hundreds of thousands made homeless; leading its cockney population, Jewish and non-Jewish alike, to be widely dispersed, with many never returning to their homes. The worst hit boroughs were Stepney and West Ham which had a third a of their housing stock destroyed or damaged beyond repair.

=== Post-war ===
After the war, Mosley lived mainly in Ireland and France, but continued to participate in British politics by founding the Union Movement whose main focus was the creation of a form of European union, through his Europe a Nation policy. The Union Movement's campaigns also included an element of racial politics.

The events of 4 October 1936 are frequently cited by modern Antifa movements as "the moment at which British fascism was decisively defeated".

== Notable participants ==
=== British Union of Fascists ===
- Oswald Mosley
- Tommy Moran

=== Metropolitan Police ===
- Philip Game

=== Counter-demonstrators ===
- Bill Alexander, communist (CPGB member) and commander of the International Brigade's British Battalion.
- Fenner Brockway, Secretary of the Independent Labour Party.
- Jack Comer, a gangster of Jewish heritage.
- Ted Grant, who would become founder-leader of Militant and then Socialist Appeal.
- Father John Groser, Anglican priest and prominent Christian socialist Groser had his nose broken by a policeman's baton.
- Charlie Hutchison, communist (CPGB member) and only Black-British member of the International Brigades
- Gladys Keable; communist (CPGB member) and the future children's editor of the Morning Star.
- Bill Keable; communist (CPGB member) and the husband of Gladys Keable, who would become the Morning Star's director.
- Winifred Langton, communist, internationalist and activist
- Max Levitas, a Jewish Communist activist (CPGB member) described by the Morning Star in 2018 as the "last survivor of the Battle of Cable Street".
- Betty Papworth, communist organizer (CPGB member) and anti-war activist
- Phil Piratin, member of the Communist Party of Great Britain (CPGB).
- Alan Winnington, communist (CPGB member), journalist and war correspondent.

=== Other ===
- Malcolm Muggeridge, satirist and TV personality, covered events as a journalist for Time and Tide magazine.

== Commemoration ==
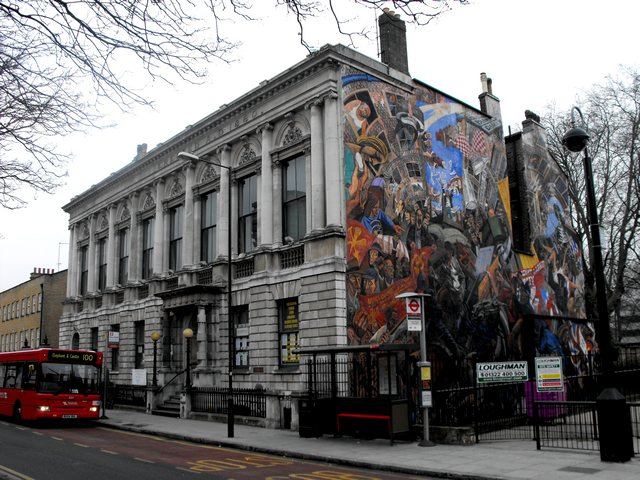
The Cable Street Mural, painted on St George's Town Hall, Wapping.

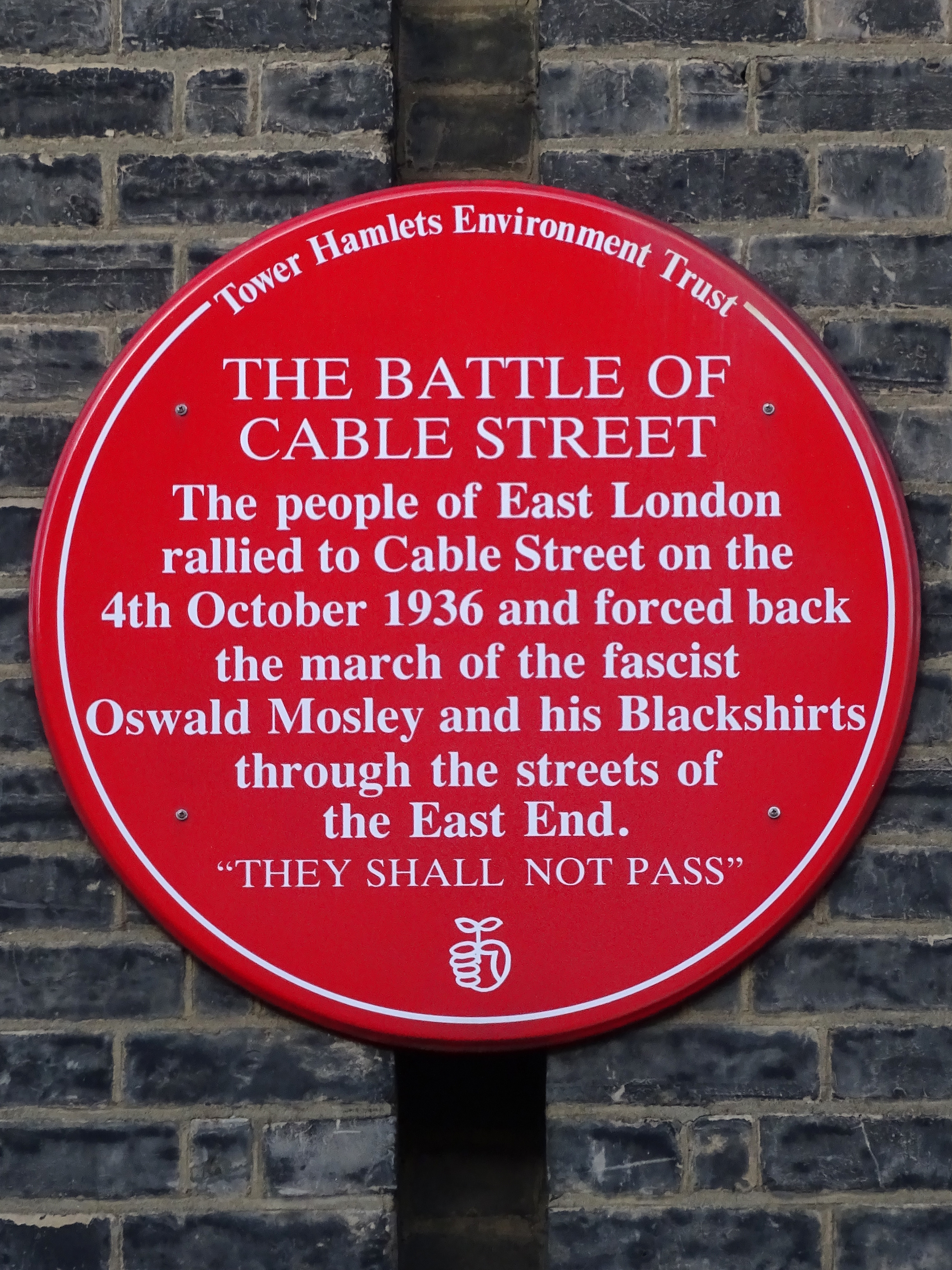
Commemorative plaque at Dock Street, close to the Fascists' Tower Hill assembly point.

The name 'Battle of Cable Street' became well known, and also the settled name of the day's events, after a BBC documentary, which focussed on the Cable Street sector, was aired in 1970.

Between 1979 and 1983, a large mural depicting the battle was painted on the side of St George's Town Hall. It stands in Cable Street, about 350 metres (380 yd) east of the main barricade that stood by the junction with Christian Street. Commissioned soon after the 40th anniversary of the battle, the Cable Street Mural is the collective work of four artists: David Binnington, Paul Butler, Desmond Rochfort, and Ray Walker.

A red plaque in Dock Street (just south of the Royal Mint Street, Leman Street, Cable Street, Dock Street crossroads that was the scene of fierce fighting) also commemorates the confrontation.

Numerous events were planned in East London for the battle's 75th anniversary in October 2011, including music and a march, and the mural was restored. In 2016, to mark the battle's 80th anniversary, a march took place from Altab Ali Park to Cable Street, attended by some of those who were originally involved.

== In popular culture ==
=== Music ===
- British folk punk band the Men They Couldn't Hang relate the battle in their 1986 song "Ghosts of Cable Street".
- The song "Cable Street" by English folk trio the Young'uns tells the story of the confrontation from the perspective of a young anti-fascist fighter.
- The song "Cable Street Again" by the Scottish black metal band Ashenspire references the Battle of Cable Street in its title and lyrics.
- The Scottish anarcho-punk band Oi Polloi refers the event in several of their songs, most prominently in "Let The Boots Do The Talking".
- German melodic death metal band Heaven Shall Burn refer to this event in the song "They Shall Not Pass" on their 2016 album Wanderer.

=== Stage ===
- The Arnold Wesker play Chicken Soup with Barley depicts an East End Jewish family on the day of the Battle of Cable Street.
- In 2023, Tracy-Ann Oberman starred as Shylock in William Shakespeare's The Merchant of Venice: 1936, adapted and directed by Brigid Larmour. The production was set during the Battle of Cable Street and toured the UK (including a run at the Royal Shakespeare Company) before transferring to the Criterion Theatre in London's West End in March 2024 for a limited run.
- A new musical called Cable Street, by Tim Gilvin and Alex Kanefsky, premiered at the Southwark Playhouse in February 2024.

=== Literature ===
- The confrontation is depicted in the 2012 novel Winter of the World by Welsh-born author Ken Follett.
- The book Night Watch, by Terry Pratchett, has a Battle of Cable Street.

=== Television ===
- In the 15 February 2019 episode of EastEnders, Dr Harold Legg and Dot Branning watch a documentary about the battle on DVD and Dr Legg recounts the events of the battle to Dot before dying, telling her that he met his wife Judith there.
- The 2010 BBC revival of the Upstairs Downstairs series devotes an episode to the Battle of Cable Street.

== See also ==
- Battle of George Square – a riot in Glasgow in 1919 in which William Gallacher (CPGB member & colleague of Phil Piratin) was involved.
- Battle of Carfax – skirmish in Oxford between the BUF and anti-fascists of the Labour Party and the Communist Party of Great Britain.
- Battle of Stockton – an earlier incident between BUF members and anti-fascists in Stockton-on-Tees on 10 September 1933
- Battle of South Street – an incident between BUF members and anti-fascists in Worthing on 9 October 1934
- Battle of De Winton Field – a clash between BUF members and anti-fascists in the Rhondda on 11 June 1936
- Battle of Holbeck Moor – a clash between BUF members and anti-fascists in Leeds on 27 September 1936
- Siege of Sidney Street – a gunfight that took place in 1911, a few streets away
- Christie Pits riot – a similar incident that took place in Toronto on 16 August 1933
- 6 February 1934 crisis – a similar event that took place in Paris
- 1935 Revolution Day Zócalo Battle – a similar event that took place in Mexico City
- Battle of Praça da Sé – a similar event that took place in São Paulo in 1934
- National Socialist Party of America v. Village of Skokie – a court case arising from a similar situation, a planned fascist march and the response to it, in 1977.
- Battle of Lewisham – a clash involving National Front demonstrators, anti-NF counter-demonstrators, and police on 13 August 1977.
