= The Black House (BUF) =

National headquarters of the British Union of Fascists

The Black House was the national headquarters of the British Union of Fascists (BUF) and the primary barracks for its paramilitary wing, the Blackshirts, from 1933 to 1936. Located on the King's Road in Chelsea, London, the former college complex served as the administrative, ideological, and residential nerve center for British Fascism during the height of the movements popularity.

== History prior to 1933 ==
The site on King's Road, situated near Sloane Square and adjacent to the Duke of York's Headquarters, originally housed Whitelands House, a girl's boarding school established in 1772. In 1841, it was converted into Whitelands Teacher Training College for women. The original Georgian structure was demolished and rebuilt in 1891 as a large red-brick Victorian institutional complex. The building remained vacant after the college relocated to Putney in 1930.

== Acquisition and conversion by the BUF ==
Following rapid membership growth after its first year, the BUF outgrew its original Westminster offices at 12 Lower Grosvenor Place and 16 Great Smith Street. In August 1933, Sir Oswald Mosley acquired the lease to the vacant Whitelands College building, renaming it the "Black House."

Mosley intended for the facility to mirror the continental fascist model, specifically the Braunes Haus (Brown House) in Munich by combining political administration with a fortified paramilitary garrison. Upon opening, the exterior was adorned with both the Union Jack and the black fascist banner, guarded at the entrance by uniformed sentries.

== Layout and daily operations ==
The Black House was large enough to hold up to 5,000 people for indoor gatherings and housed a permanent garrison of between 50 and 200 full-time Blackshirts. The interior was heavily modified to support a self-contained fascist community:

- Administrative Wing: Contained Mosley's wood-paneled executive office, national propaganda departments, and the editorial offices for the party's newspaper such as The Blackshirt.
- Barracks and Mess Halls: Provided dormitories, canteens, and recreation rooms for paid, full-time volunteers, who were primarily unemployed young working-class men who lived on-site in exchange for free rations, uniforms, and a weekly stipend.
- Training Facilities: Featured gymnasiums, fencing strips, and boxing rings where the elite "I Squad" underwent daily military drilling, and hand-to-hand combat training.
- Motor Pool: The courtyard and parade ground housed a fleet of roughly 30 BUF transport vehicles, including specialized armor vans fitted with wire mesh to protect Blackshirts from thrown projectiles during regional deployments.

== Decline and closure ==
Following the violent fallout of the 1934 Olympia Rally, and the subsequent withdrawal of financial backing from press baron Lord Rothermere, the BUF faced severe financial contraction. Maintaining the Chelsea complex proved to be unsustainable as the party revenue dropped and the operational focus shifted toward street-level campaigns in London's East End.

In 1936, the BUF vacated the Black House and relocated to smaller, less expensive headquarters in Great Smith Street, Westminster. The empty building was later demolished and the site was redeveloped into residential flats.

== See also ==
- British Union of Fascists
- British Blackshirts
- Oswald Mosley
- The Greater Britain
- Brown House, Munich
