= Gardiner's (department store) =

Former department store in London

Coordinates: 51°30′55.03″N 0°4′16.44″W

Gardiner's was a department store at the junction of Whitechapel High Street and Commercial Road, London. Opened in the 1870s, it specialised in Scottish clothing and military uniforms. It was destroyed by fire in May 1972. Its site, where the main confrontation of the Battle of Cable Street took place in 1936, is sometimes still referred to as Gardiner's Corner.

== See also ==
- List of department stores of the United Kingdom
