= Commercial Road =

Street in London, England

Coordinates: 51.5127444°N 0.0371536°W

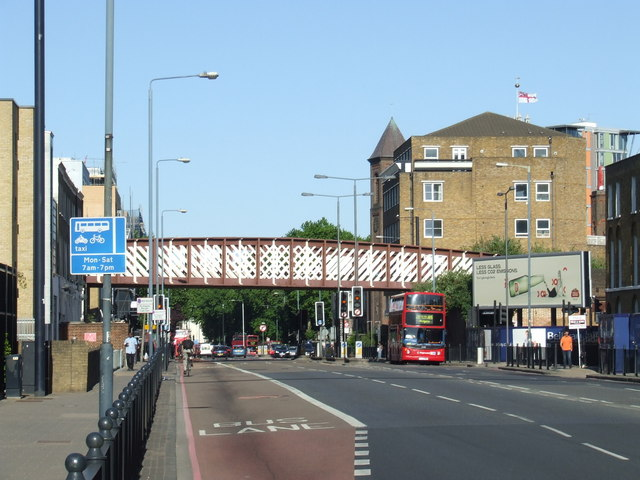
- Commercial Road facing the former Limehouse Curve

- Location within London Borough of Tower Hamlets
- Part of: A13
- Length: 1.9 mi (3.1 km)
- From: Whitechapel High Street
- To: East India Dock Road

Construction
- Construction start: 1802
- Completed: 1806

Commercial Road is a street in the London Borough of Tower Hamlets in the East End of London. It is 1.9 miles (3.1 km) long, running from Gardiner's Corner (previously the site of Gardiners department store, and now Aldgate East Underground station), through Stepney to the junction with Burdett Road in Limehouse at which point the route splits into the East India Dock Road and the West India Dock Road. It is an artery connecting the City of London with Canary Wharf and part of the A13.

The road contains several listed buildings. These include the George Tavern, the Troxy cinema, the Limehouse Town Hall, the former Caird and Rayner Ltd works and the Albert Gardens estate.

== Route ==
Commercial Road starts at a junction with Whitechapel High Street (the A11 close to Aldgate East tube station. It heads east, crossing the Limehouse Basin, the Regents Canal and the Limehouse Cut. At Burdett Road, the road forks in two, with East India Dock Road continuing to the left and West India Dock Road to the right.

London Buses routes 15, 115 and 135 run along Commercial Road.

== History ==
Roads from West India Docks Act 1802
- Act of Parliament
- Parliament of the United Kingdom
- Long title: An Act for making and maintaining, and for watching, lighting, and watering a Road from the West India Docks, in the Isle of Dogs, to communicate with a Street called Church Lane or Church Street, Whitechapel; and for making and maintaining a Branch of Road therefrom, to communicate with Queen Street, in the Parish of Saint Anne, all in the County of Middlesex; for opening, widening, and improving certain Streets and Passages therein mentioned, and for more effectually amending and keeping in Repair, a Road from Ratcliffe Highway through Cannon Street, in the County of Middlesex, into the Road leading into the County of Essex, and also from the West End of Brook Street into Cable Street, and from Upper Shadwell Street into the Back Lane, in the said County of Middlesex.
- Citation: 42 Geo. 3. c. ci

Dates
- Royal assent: 22 June 1802
Other legislation
Repealed by	Commercial and East India and Barking Roads Act 1828

Status: Repealed

Text of statute as originally enacted

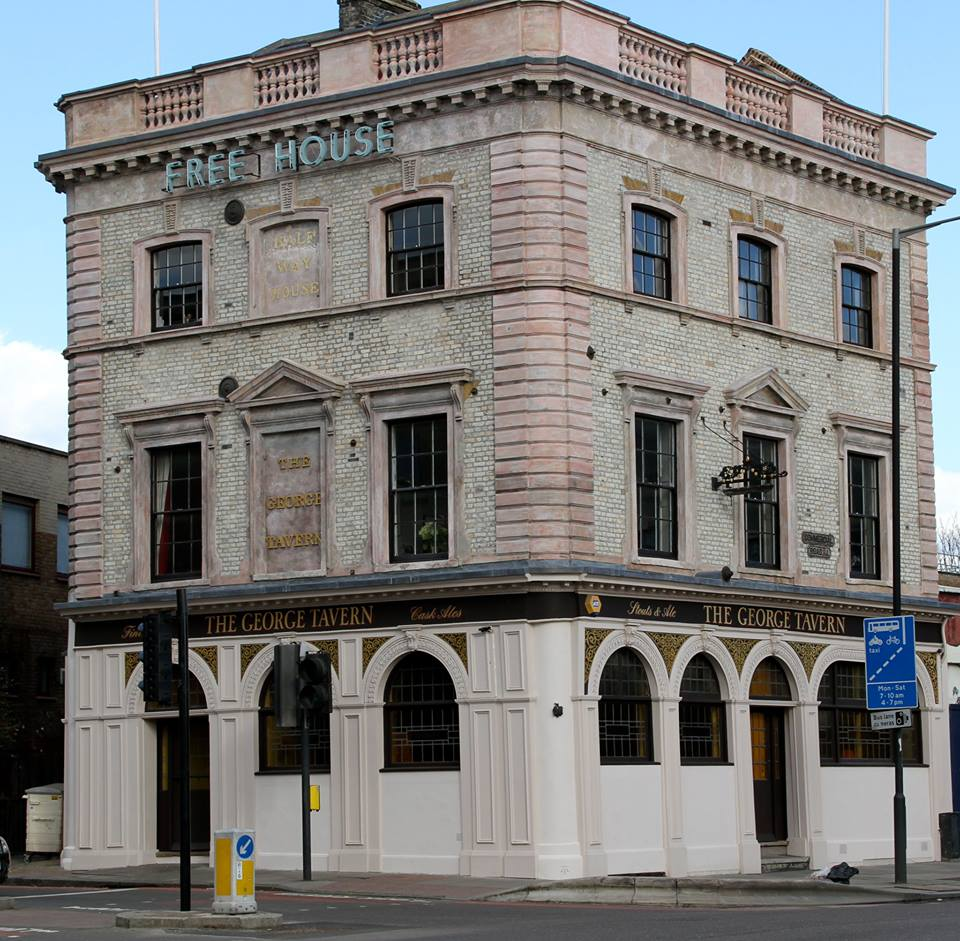
The George Tavern

Commercial Road was constructed in 1802–1806 as a direct route to link dock traffic between the West India Docks and East India Docks to the City of London. The Roads from West India Docks Act 1802 (42 Geo. 3. c. ci) awarded construction to the Commercial Road Company, whose trustees were allowed to raise money and levy tolls. The road originally began at Back Church Lane and cut a straight line across fields north of the busy Ratcliffe Highway, taking advantage of land cleared by a major fire in 1794 that had destroyed a large part of the neighbourhood. By the 1830s it was almost entirely lined with houses all the way to Limehouse.

In 1828, the Commercial Road Company built a tramway from Aberdeen granite along the road, to alleviate traffic concerns. The London and Blackwall Railway was built parallel to Commercial Road; along with the numerous factories, this caused the street to become overcrowded and polluted.

In the 1860s Commercial Road became a public road, with ownership transferring to the Metropolitan Board of Works (MBW), and road tolls were abolished. In 1870, the MBW extended the street westwards to Gardiner's Corner, where it met Whitechapel High Street and Commercial Street. This junction remained in place until Gardner's was destroyed in a fire in the early 1970s.

In 1943, Commercial Road was marked for improvement in the County of London Plan, after much of the surrounding area had been destroyed by bombing. Numerous side streets south of the road towards Ratcliffe Highway were cleared of slums and replaced with modern housing. The Commercial Road Conservation Area was established by the London Borough of Tower Hamlets in 1989. It is focused on numerous listed buildings around Nos. 300–334 about halfway along the road.

== Buildings ==
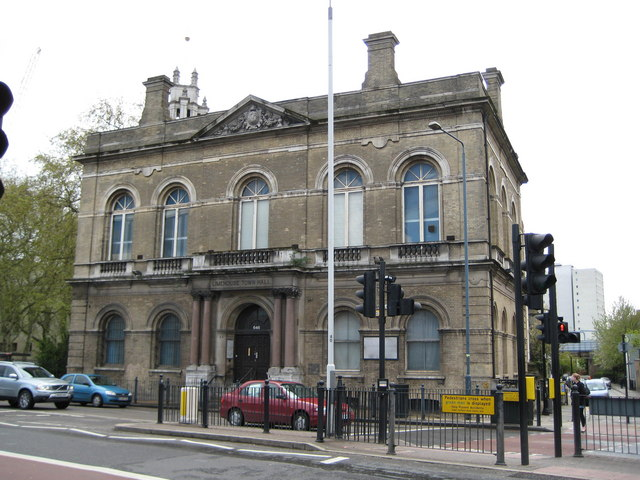
Limehouse Town Hall

The George Tavern is at No. 373. It was built around 1820–25 on the site of an earlier pub, the Halfway House, which had been established since at least 1654. It became Grade II listed in 1973.

Albert Gardens lies to the south of Commercial Road. It was laid out in the early 19th century, originally named Albert Square Garden, and has largely survived intact into the 21st century. The square consists of three sides of three-storey residential buildings constructed in the 1840s, overlooking a railed garden. The other side faces onto Commercial Road. The land was brought by the London County Council in 1899 to prevent development on the fourth side, and opened the land to the public in 1906. It was given its current name in 1937.

Nos. 440–450 are all Grade II listed. They were built in the early 19th century as a terrace, and all span four storeys with parapets roofs, round arched entrances and panelled doors.

The Troxy Cinema at No. 490 was opened by George Coles and Arthur Roberts in 1933 on a former brewery site. It cost £250,000 to develop and could house over 3,000 people. The main theatre housed a revolving stage Wurlitzer organ which could be raised from the orchestra pit to provide interval music; these have survived intact. It closed in 1960, reopening in 1963 as a training school for the Covent Garden Opera. It subsequently became a bingo hall. It was grade II listed in 1991.

Limehouse Town Hall is at No. 646, constructed in 1879 by A. and C. Harston. It was badly damaged in World War II and rebuilt as council offices. It has subsequently served as the National Museum of Labour History, a homeless shelter, and an arts centre. The Passmore Edwards Sailors Palace at No. 680 was built in 1901 in a Neo Tudor style. It has been Grade II listed since 1983.

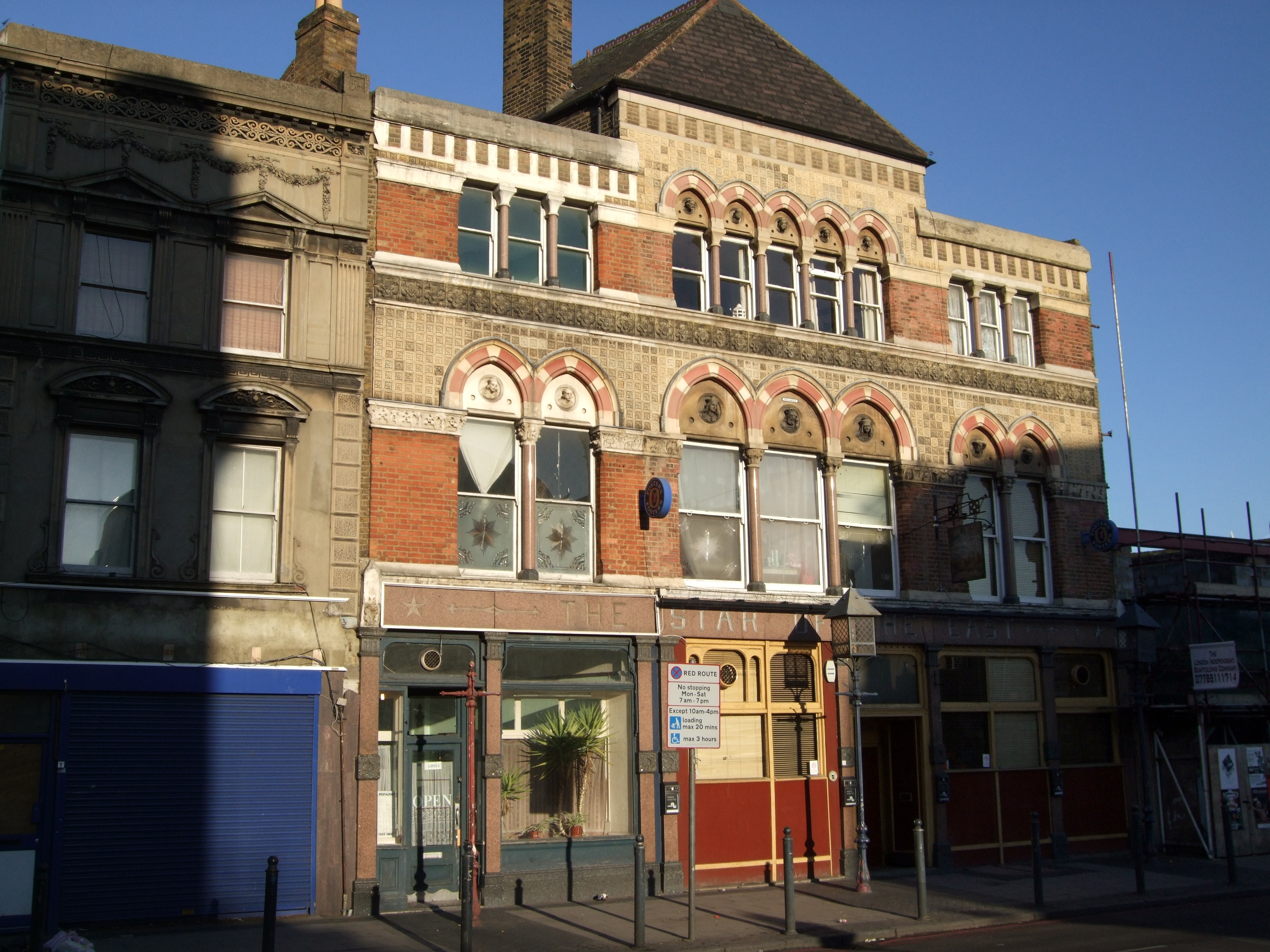
The Star of the East

The Grade II listed former premises of Caird and Rayner Ltd at No. 777–783 was constructed in 1869. It contained a timber frame enclosed by a brick exterior. In 2010, it caught fire which destroyed most of the roof. Urgent repairs took place in 2010 in light of its listed status.

The Star of the East, at No. 805 was built in the early 19th century, and Grade II listed in 1973. It was constructed from red brick with a slate roof. In 2019, urgent repairs were made to the premises in order for it to retain its listed status.

The Church of St Mary and St Michael is at No. 340. It was designed by William Wardell and constructed between 1852 and 1856. A sloping roof was built over the entrance in the 1920s. It became Grade II listed in June 2001. The Congregation of Jacob Synagogue is at Nos. 351–353. It was founded in 1903 as Britain's first Mizrachi synagogues, and moved into the present building in 1920. The premises had been originally constructed by Lewis Solomon and Son. London's first mosque, the East London Mosque, opened on Commercial Road in 1941 and remained there until it was relocated to Whitechapel in 1975.

A K2 phone box outside No. 48 Commercial Road was Grade II listed in 1987. It was designed by Giles Gilbert Scott and installed in 1927.

== Traffic ==
As the main route between the City and the traditional East End, Commercial Road is the busiest road in the London Borough of Tower Hamlets. There is continuous heavy traffic along the road, with limited opportunities for pedestrians crossing.

== Nearby roads ==
- Alie Street
- Cable Street
- Narrow Street

== See also ==
- Siege of Sidney Street
- Stepney Historical Trust
