= Limehouse Town Hall =

Municipal building in London, England

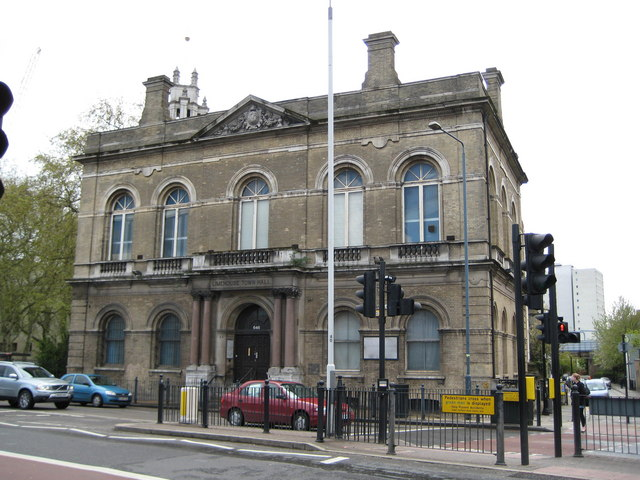
- Limehouse Town Hall

- Shown in Tower Hamlets
- 51°30′43.56″N 0°1′53.22″W
- Location: Commercial Road, Limehouse

History
- Built: 1881

Site notes
- Architect(s): Arthur and Christopher Harston
- Architectural style: Palazzo style

Listed Building – Grade II
- Designated: 27 September 1973
- Reference no.: 1240047

Limehouse Town Hall is a former town hall building on Commercial Road, in Limehouse, in the London Borough of Tower Hamlets. It is a Grade II listed building.

== History ==
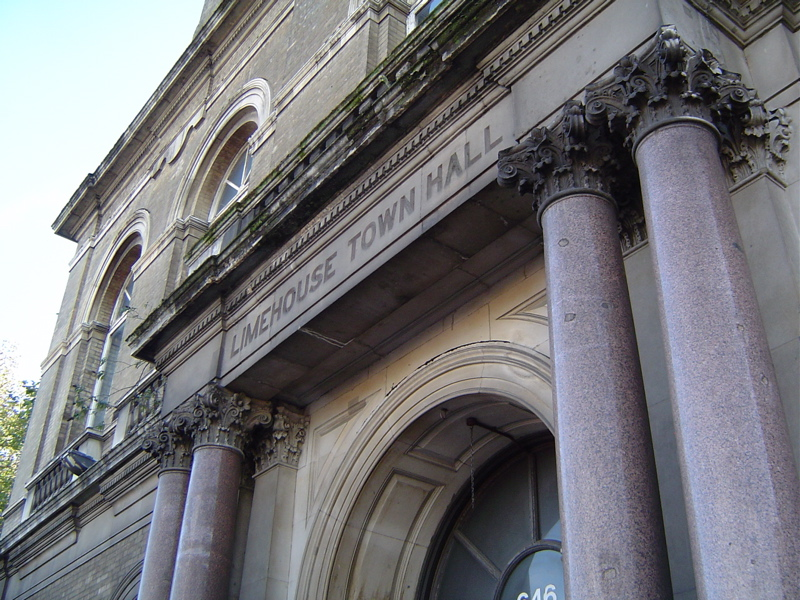
The building entrance

The building was commissioned by the Limehouse Board of Works as a vestry hall for the benefit of the Parish of St Anne's. The site selected by the vestry had previously been occupied by a private residence belonging to a Mr. Walter.

The foundation stone for the building was laid by the churchwarden, James Rollinson, on 21 October 1879. The building was designed Arthur and Christopher Harston in the Palazzo style and built by J. H. Johnson and was opened as the vestry hall of the Limehouse District on 29 March 1881. The design involved a symmetrical main frontage with five bays facing onto Commercial Road; the central section featured a portico flanked by Corinthian order columns and a balcony above; there were round headed windows on the first floor and a carved pediment above. The principal rooms were the council chamber on the ground floor and an assembly room on the first floor.

After the civil parish became a part of the Metropolitan Borough of Stepney in 1900, the town hall ceased to be the seat of local government and was used as an events venue and administrative centre.

On 30 July 1909 the Chancellor of the Exchequer David Lloyd George made a polemical speech in the assembly room, attacking the House of Lords for its opposition to his "People's Budget". This speech was the origin of the phrase "To Limehouse", or "Limehousing", which meant an incendiary political speech. The building was badly damaged in the Blitz during the Second World War but was subsequently restored and re-opened by the Prime Minister, Clement Attlee, in November 1950.

Responsibility for management of the building was transferred to the London Borough of Tower Hamlets in 1965 and it was re-opened as the National Museum of Labour History by the Prime Minister, Harold Wilson, in May 1975. After the museum got into financial difficulties and then moved to Manchester in the late 1980s (it subsequently became the People's History Museum), the building in London served as the Wapping Neighbourhood Offices until 1994, when it became a training centre and winter shelter for homeless people.

The building was placed on English Heritage's list of buildings at risk in 2003. Four founding organisations (Stitches in Time, the Boxing Club, Primal Pictures and the Creative Week newspaper) then established the Limehouse Town Hall Consortium Trust, secured a long lease on the building in 2004, and restored the building with support from English Heritage. It was then re-opened as a community centre in April 2012.

== Features and current use ==
The building has a number of offices located on the ground floor below the assembly room. It is home to several groups, including some of founding organisations, as well as ArtSpokes, the Space Hijackers, Students for a Free Tibet and Equilibrium. The building is not generally open to the public, but participates in Open House London for guided tours of the building.
