= Whitechapel High Street =

Street in London

Coordinates: 51.515°N 0.072°W

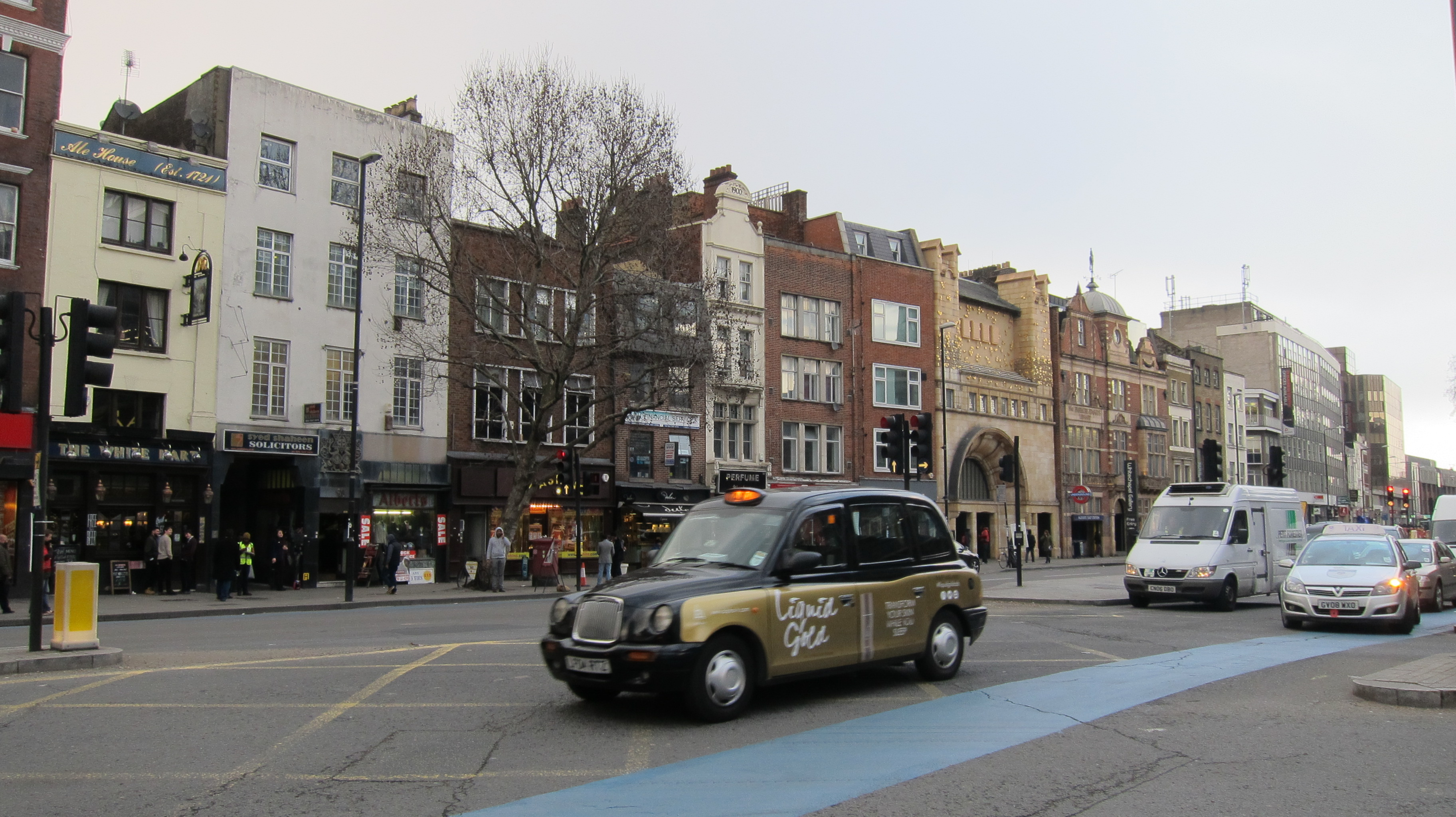
The north side of Whitechapel High Street in 2015

Whitechapel High Street is a street in the Borough of Tower Hamlets in the East End of London. It is about 0.2 miles (350 m) long, making it "one of the shortest high streets in London". It links Aldgate High Street to the south-west with Whitechapel Road to the north-east, and includes junctions with Commercial Street to the north and Commercial Road to the east.

For motorists, it is the start of the A11 from London to Norwich. For cyclists, it is the start of Cycleway 2 from Aldgate to Stratford. For pedestrians, it is a route from Aldgate tube station to Brick Lane.

"Whitechapel High Street provides a transition between the commercial development pressures from the City and the historic east end communities." The street has many narrow plots with 3–5 storey buildings, rebuilt and enlarged at different times in different styles. It was designated a conservation area in 2007.

In 2015 it was named by the Royal Society for Public Health as London's most unhealthy high street, having the highest concentration of fast-food outlets, payday lenders, bookmakers and tanning salons.

== History ==
Whitechapel High Street follows part of a Roman road, presumed to have continued to Colchester. A major Roman cemetery was located along the street.

In the medieval period the street was known as Algatestreet. It was a major thoroughfare to and from the City of London. Settlement in the area probably began in the 13th century.

The name "Whitechapel" refers to a chapel of ease in the parish of Stepney that was built in the mid-13th century in the area that is now Altab Ali Park on Whitechapel Road. The church was named St Mary Matfelon, but commonly known as the "White Chapel", referring to the colour of its white chalk rubble walls.

Early maps such as the Agas map show that by the mid-16th century the street had a continuous frontage of mostly 2-storey timber-framed houses with fields behind. Remains of the Boar's Head Inn, which included the site of the Boar's Head Theatre from 1598 to 1616, were found beneath the Unite Students building (No 141–143).

John Stow's Survey of London in 1603 complained that the street was "pestered" with cottages and alleys, concluding that the "unsavoury" passage to Aldgate was "no small blemish to so famous a city". Morgan's map of 1682 shows "White Chapel Street" extending from Aldgate to St Mary's Church, with numerous narrow alleys leading to courtyards or fields behind the street. Some still remain, such as Angel Alley (No 84) and Gunthorpe Street (No 88). While no buildings survive from this period, later buildings such as No 85 and Nos 91–93 reused their extremely narrow plots, preserving their cramped character. By 1746, Roque's map shows the land behind the street was entirely built up.

In contrast to the buildings, the street itself was wide. Maitland's Survey of London of 1756 describes it as "a spacious Street for Entrance into the City Eastward … accommodated with good Inns for the Reception of Travellers, Horses, Coaches, Waggons, &c [and] a great many Butchers, who carry on a great Trade, both Wholesale and Retail". The oldest remaining inn is the White Hart (No 89) from 1721.

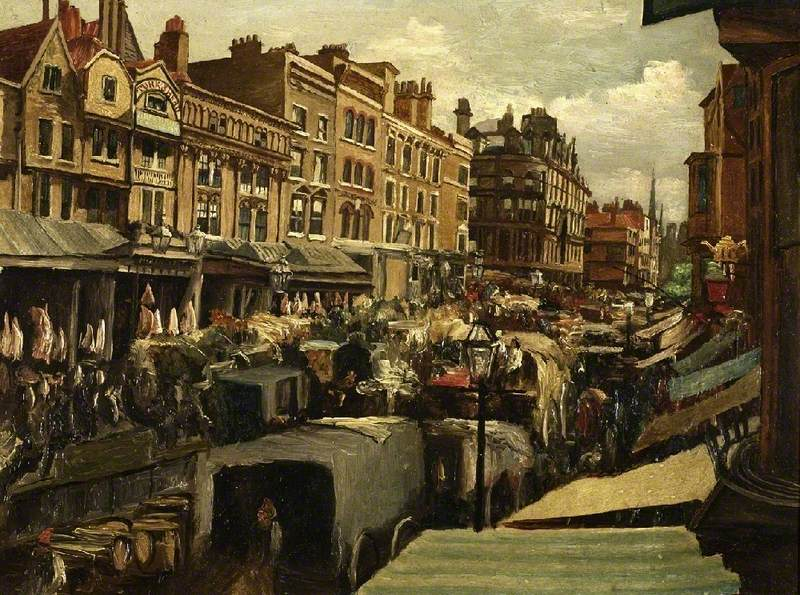
Whitechapel High Street in 1869, painted by Edwin Edwards

Carey's map of 1795 introduced the modern name "White Chapel High Street" for the part of the street outside the City of London boundary; Whitechapel Road for the western part beginning at St Mary's Church; and Aldgate High Street for the eastern part between the city boundary and the old Roman wall. By 1810 there were 148 numbered buildings.

"Whitechapel High Street was lined with coaching inns; the road was full of traffic, carts with garden produce, market women with baskets of fruit, flocks of sheet, herds of cattle, brewers' drays and hay wains for the hay market." From at least 1665 until 1928, in the Whitechapel hay market, farmers sold animal fodder from large carts in the street.

In the late 18th and early 19th century the street was lined with 4-storey brick shop-houses, still visible at Nos 65–68, 74–76 and 128–129. It became a traffic intersection. Commercial Road was created in 1802–4 to link the docks with the City. The southern section of Commercial Street was created in 1843–5 as part of a slum clearance programme, and to connect Whitechapel High Street with Spitalfields Market. The Whitechapel to Bow tramway opened in 1870. In 1884 the District Railway extended its underground service through Aldgate East to Whitechapel station.

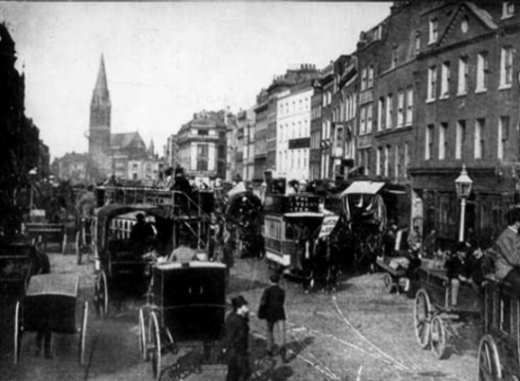
Whitechapel High Street in 1905, looking east towards St Mary's Church

As London's population increased during the 19th century, and Whitechapel as a whole suffered poverty and overcrowding, the high street remained relatively prosperous. It shows as a narrow strip of "middle class – well-to-do" housing on Booth's poverty map of 1889. Victorian era philanthropic improvements included the ornate Passmore Edwards Library and the Whitechapel Gallery. Grand Edwardian era buildings remain at Nos 90, 102–5 and 126–7.

Many Jewish refugees from Eastern Europe to Whitechapel during 1880–1914 found work in the clothing industry, and the high street became their shop window. Clothing and footwear accounted for one-third of the 144 businesses listed on the street in 1921. The last remaining ones are at No 65a, 88 and 102–5. The largest was Gardiner's department store (Nos 31–35), which opened in the 1870s and was destroyed by fire in 1972. The traffic intersection became known as Gardiner's Corner. In 1936 a fascist march into the East End was blocked there in the Battle of Cable Street. One of the few remaining signs of the Jewish presence is a Star of David on the former Jewish Daily Post building (No 88).

Like much of the East End, Whitechapel High Street was extensively damaged by the blitz during World War II. Some buildings were repaired in their original style; others were rebuilt during the 1950s in plain utilitarian style, such as No 83, 87 and 94. Some sites, such as No 97, remained empty for decades. Rising property prices have encouraged repair and rebuilding, and few signs of the blitz remain. One notable absence is St Mary's Church, which was gutted by a fire bomb in 1940 and demolished in 1952.

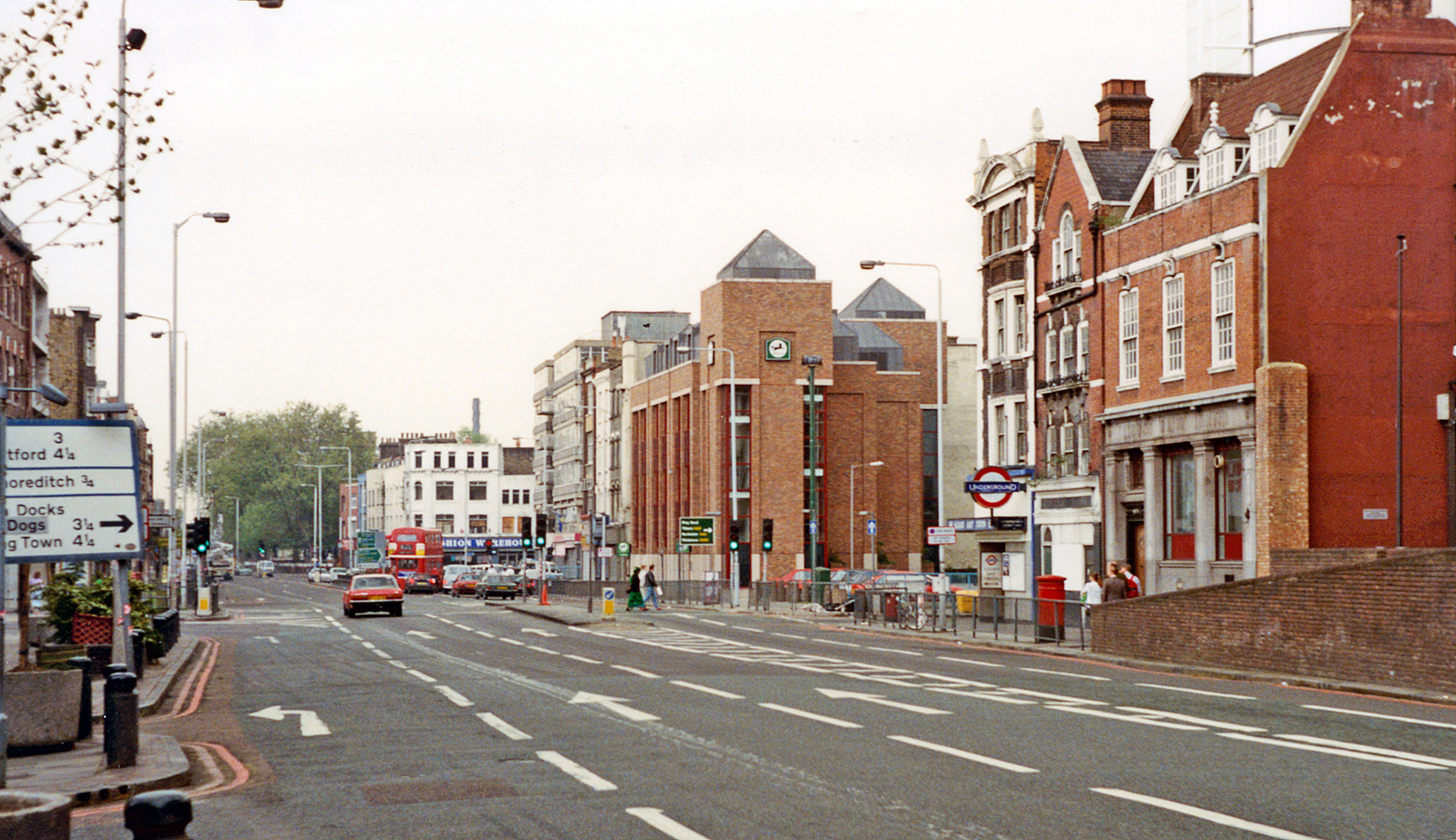
Whitechapel High Street in 1991, looking east on the Aldgate Gyratory

In the 1960s the street became one-way as part of the Aldgate Gyratory, isolating the buildings on the south side as far as Gardiner's department store in the centre of a large roundabout with return flow along Braham Street. Large concrete and glass office buildings occupied this area, creating a "sense of desolation and insecurity for pedestrians". The gyratory system was removed in 2008, and Whitechapel High Street became two-way again. Tall office and apartment buildings were combined with attempts to improve the street level environment.

== Buildings ==
=== South Side ===
Starts at: Mansell Street

The White Chapel Building, 10 Whitechapel High Street – an 8-storey office building, designed by Fitzroy Robinson & Partners, built in 1982–1984. It has a prominent grid of chamfered mullions and floorbands, with polished granite cladding. The tall storey heights allowed raised flooring to conceal computer wiring. The building was originally known as Sedgewick Centre, and was occupied by Royal Bank of Scotland during 2005–15.

Aldgate Tower, 2 Leman Street – an 18-storey office building, designed by WilkinsonEyre, built in 2013–14. It has a curved glass façade over a steel frame and grey columns at ground level.

Side street: Leman Street

Construction site – planned 6-storey and 25-storey office buildings, part of the Aldgate Place development. The site was once Gardiners' department store.

Side street: Commercial Road

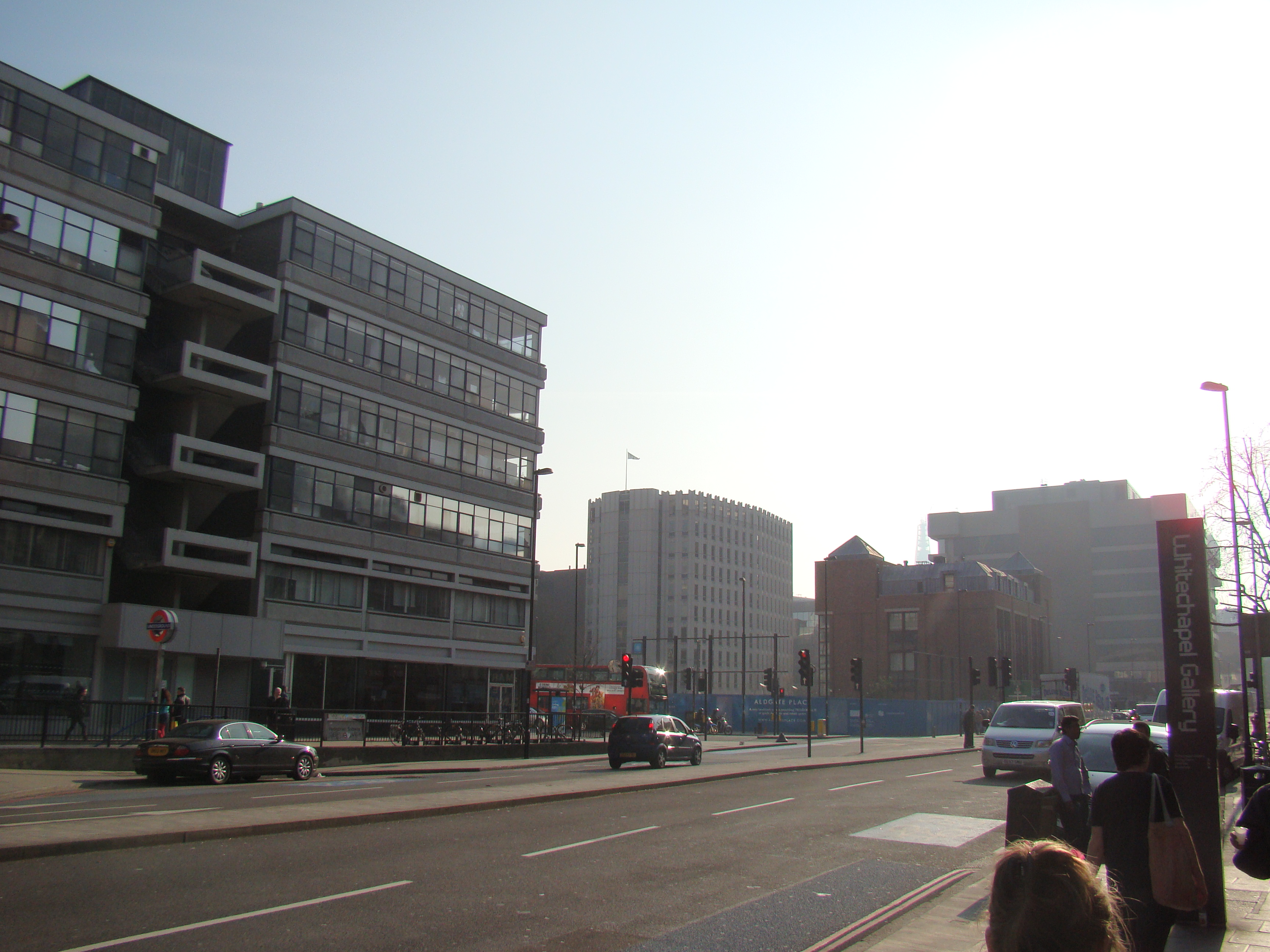
Central House in 2012

Central House – a 6-storey flatted factory, designed by Lush & Lester, built in 1964–65. It is built in a modernist style with visible reinforced concrete frame and glass bands, and known as the "Aldgate Bauhaus". It was occupied by textile factories and the Cass School of Art and Architecture of the London Metropolitan University. An extension built in 2020–22 will add a further 6 storeys of office space. Designed by Allford Hall Monaghan Morris and inspired by Rachel Whiteread's Fourth Plinth, the extension adds an equal volume that mimics the horizontal banding of the original.

65a Whitechapel High Street – a 4-storey commercial building, built c1897 in Victorian style in red brick with Portland stone dressings.

65–68 Whitechapel High Street – a terrace of four 4-storey 2-bay shop-houses, built in 1853 in Georgian style in stock brick with Portland stone dressings and a gambrel roof concealed by a parapet. It was refurbished in 2010–12.

69–70 Whitechapel High Street – two 4-storey shop-houses, built in 1908–11, refurbished in 2005–10.

71 Whitechapel High Street – a 3-storey warehouse-showroom, built in 1983 in red brick, converted to a college c.1998. A top floor was added c2020 and as of 2025 the ground floor is occupied by a Turkish coffee and dessert shop.

Ends at: White Church Lane

=== North Side ===
Starts at: Osborn Street

74 Whitechapel High Street – a 4-storey corner shop-house, built 1828–29 in brick (now painted white). In 2001 the ground floor was converted to a restaurant and the upper floors to flats.

75 Whitechapel High Street – a 4-storey 3-bay shop-house, possibly built in the early 19th century, in stock brick with red brick lintels. It has been an electrical wholesaler since c2002.

76 Whitechapel High Street – a 4-storey 2-bay shop-house, built in 1845 in stock brick with stucco window frames, lintels and cornice. It has been an electrical wholesaler since c1975.

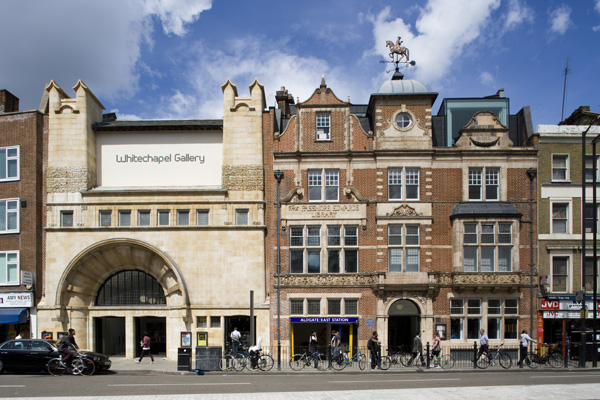
Whitechapel Gallery in 2009

Former Passmore Edwards Library – a 4-storey public library designed by Potts, Son & Hennings in Jacobethan style in red brick with terracotta dressings. One of the earliest public libraries in London, it was funded by philanthropist John Passmore Edwards and opened in 1892. It became part of the Whitechapel Gallery in 2009.

Whitechapel Gallery – designed by Charles Harrison Townsend in an Art Nouveau style, built in 1898–99 in buff terracotta.

83 Whitechapel High Street – a 5-storey single-bay commercial building, built in 1957 in red brick. The upper floors were converted to flats in 2007. The ground floor is a café.

84 Whitechapel High Street – a 4-storey single-bay commercial building, built in 1957 in red brick. It retains its original triplet windows within thin concrete frames and thick flat mullions. The ground floor is a fast food restaurant. The building steps over Angel Alley.

84a Whitechapel High Street - the eastern side of Angel Alley, was, until 1942, leased by Express Printers, which became defunct. In 1942 Freedom Press, the oldest anarchist publisher in the English language, bought from the landlord all of the printing equipment which was housed in the basement, the ground floor and the first floor of the building, and took a lease out on the building. Until the late 1960s, it was 'a slum property with its quote of rats and damp'. In 1968 anarchist Vernon Richards bought it with 84b and 84c. Then, with the help of volunteers, Freedom Press moved the contents of its office and stockroom from its short-term premises (a shop and offices) in Maxwell Road, Fulham to 84a, temporarily, because of its intention to make 84b its permanent quarters. In 1982 84a was sold to the Whitechapel Gallery.

84b Whitechapel High Street - the western side of Angel Alley, was in 1942, 'a ramshackle three-story structure' which in 1968, with 84a, was purchased by Vernon Richards. Following the purchase, the floors were strengthened to take the weight of the printing machines which were moved into it from the basement of 84a and the publications of the press. In 1982 Algate Press was launched as an independent printing co-op. Also in 1982, Richards donated the freehold of 84b to the Friends of Freedom Press.

84c Whitechapel High Street - in 1968 'a bombed out site' which, with 84a and 84b, see above, was purchased 'as one lot'.

85 Whitechapel High Street – a narrow 4-storey shop-house, designed as a public house by Bird & Walters, built in 1900 in red brick with stone dressings (now painted white). The ground floor is a nail salon.

86 Whitechapel High Street – a 4-storey 2-bay shop-house, probably mid-19th century, but refronted in 1991 in brown bricks with metal windows and a projecting tiled mansard attic. The ground floor is a café.

87 Whitechapel High Street – a 3-storey 3-bay shop-house, built c1955 with red brick facing and triplet metal windows with thin concrete frames. The ground floor is an amusement arcade.

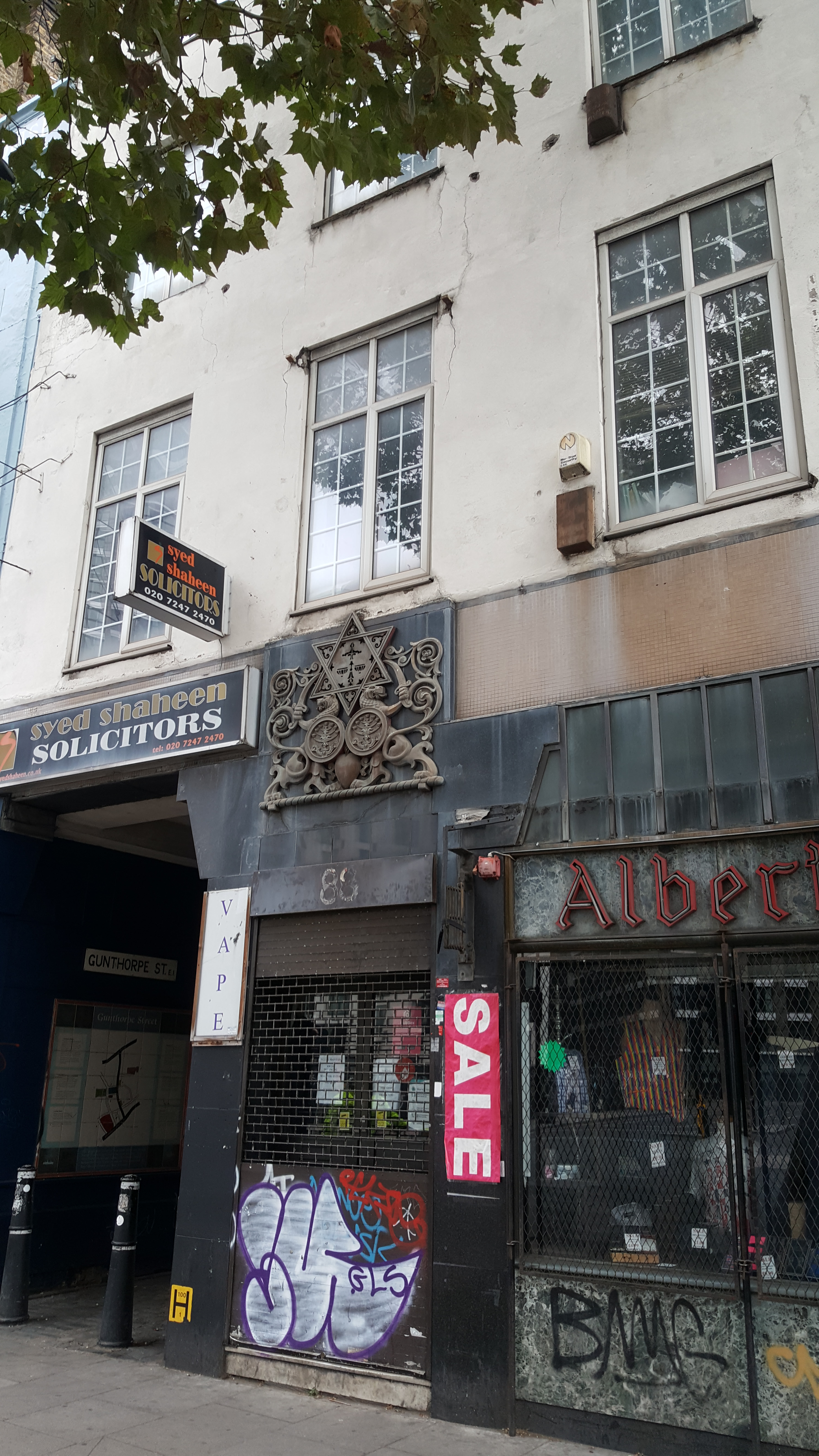
88 Whitechapel High Street in 2020

88 Whitechapel High Street – a 4-storey 3-bay shop and office, built in 1838, in stuccoed stock brick. The building steps over the entrance to Gunthorpe Street. It has been occupied by the menswear shop Alberts since 1942. The Grade II listed metal relief above the door by Arthur Szyk depicts a Star of David supported by two Lions of Judah wielding sabres, and was commissioned by the Jewish Daily Post, which occupied the building in 1934–35.

Side street: Gunthorpe Street

The White Hart – a 4-storey single-bay public house, founded in 1721, rebuilt in the 1930s, with traces of Corinthian pilasters from the 1830s.

90 Whitechapel High Street – a 5-storey 3-bay shop and office, built in 1910 in red brick. The stuccoed centre bay includes an oriel window with broken scroll pediment above. The building was occupied by Blooms restaurant from 1952 to 1996, and since by the fast food restaurant Burger King. The upper floor offices were converted to flats in 1998.

91 Whitechapel High Street – a 4-storey single-bay shop built in 1862 in stock brick. It is just 3.3m wide. The upper floor offices were converted to flats and a fifth floor added in 2018. The ground floor is a café.

92–93 Whitechapel High Street – two 5-storey shop-houses, one single-bay and one 2-bay, built in 1861 in stock brick. The ground floor shops were integrated by 1990. In 2002 the upper floors were integrated as flats, and an extra storey was added.

94 Whitechapel High Street – a 5-storey shop and office building, designed by Fitzroy Robinson and Hubert H. Bull, built in 1960. It is built in breezeblock in a concrete frame, faced in brown brick with metal framed windows. The building steps over an entrance to a car park, formerly an inn yard.

95–96 Whitechapel High Street – a 5-storey 3-bay shop and office building. It was built in 1902 as a clothing workshop. After wartime damage it was rebuilt in a utilitarian style in 1954 with grey brick facing and metal framed windows in concrete surrounds, retaining the Edwardian canted oriel windows on the upper floors. In 2013 the top floors were converted into flats and the lower floors were occupied by the restaurant Big Moe's Diner. The ground floor is now occupied by the Whitechapel themed fish and chip shop Jack the Chipper.

97–98 Whitechapel High Street – an empty site since clearance after World War II. A planning application proposes a 4-storey infill, also replacing No 101 and restoring No 102–5, with a 15-storey office tower behind.

101 Whitechapel High Street – a 5-storey shop and office building, designed by S.A. Burden, built in 1961 in a modernist style, with reinforced-concrete side beams and floor plates set forward of shallow bow windows. Formerly a bank, it is now a betting shop with student accommodation above.

102–105 Whitechapel High Street – a 4-storey commercial building, built in 1909, including a first floor in cream faience with display windows within semi-circular arches, and two floors above in red-orange brick with plain windows and raised keystones. It was occupied by Woolworths from 1928 to 1960.

Side street: Commercial Street

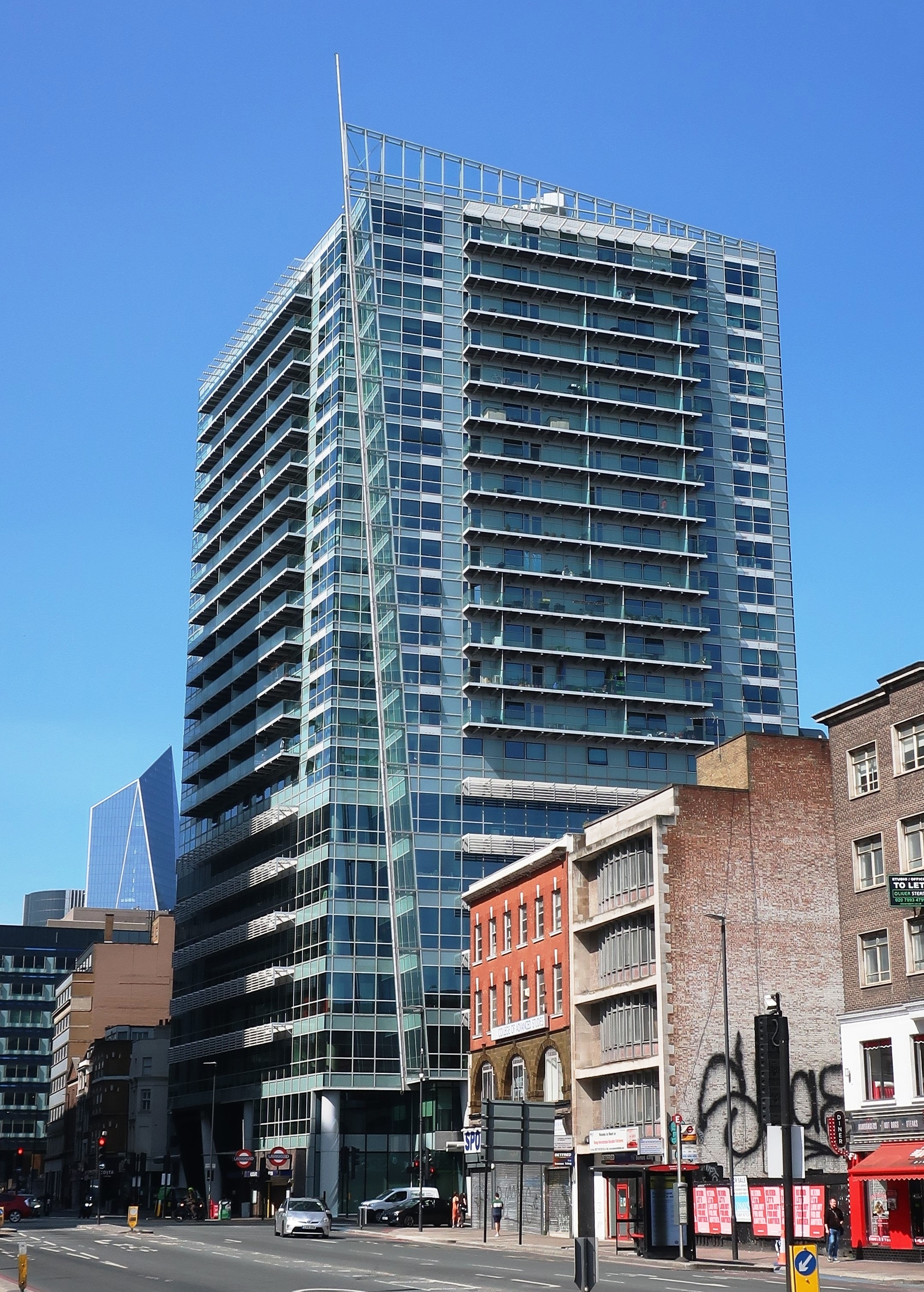
The Relay Building in 2020

Relay Building, 1 Commercial Street – a 23-storey mixed use building designed by Sigma Seifert, built during 2008–14. It includes 16 floors of apartments, 6 floors of offices and retail units on the ground floor. It has grey-tinted glass and light grey panels, with a ranked projection on the Commercial Street façade. The building steps over the entrance to Aldgate East tube station.

Side street: Tyne Street

122 Whitechapel High Street – a 4-storey shop-house built in 1882 in red brick (now painted white) in a Queen Anne style. The ground floor is an estate agent.

Side street: Old Castle Street

126–7 Whitechapel High Street – a 4-storey corner shop and office building, designed by Martin Luther Saunders, built in 1905–6 in stock brick. The ground floor has been a café since 2010, when the upper floors were converted to flats and a 5th floor added.

128 Whitechapel High Street – a 4-storey 2-bay shop-house built in the late 18th century in plain Georgian style with flat window heads. A first floor display window was added in 1928, and a 4th floor flat added in 2007–8. Nevertheless, it "remains the only middling shop-house on Whitechapel High Street to retain a semblance of its late 18th century appearance".

129 Whitechapel High Street – a 4-storey 2-bay shop-house built in the early 19th century. A mansard attic was added in 1876 and rusticated quoins and embellished windows were added in 1910.

130 Whitechapel High Street – a 3-storey former bank, designed by F. G. Frizell and built in 1956–7 in a neo-Georgian style. The ground floor is clad in black granite, and the upper floors are faced in orange-red brick with concrete-framed windows. The building was designed for National Westminster Bank, which closed in 2013.

Oceanair House, 133–137 Whitechapel High Street – a 7-storey shop and office building, designed by Philip Nicolle and built in 1937–38 in a streamlined deco moderne style with metal framed windows wrapping around the corner. The upper floors are faced in brown brick (now painted grey). It was the first building on the street to exceed 5 storeys. The upper floors were destroyed by bomb blast in 1940, and restored in 1955.

Side street: Goulston Street

Construction site – a 24-storey student accommodation building, part of a mixed use development including office and exhibition space, designed by Architecture PLB for Unite Students.

Ends at: Middlesex Street
