= Church of St Mary and St Michael, Stepney =

Church in London, England

Coordinates: 51.51376°N 0.052098°W

Church of St Mary and St Michael
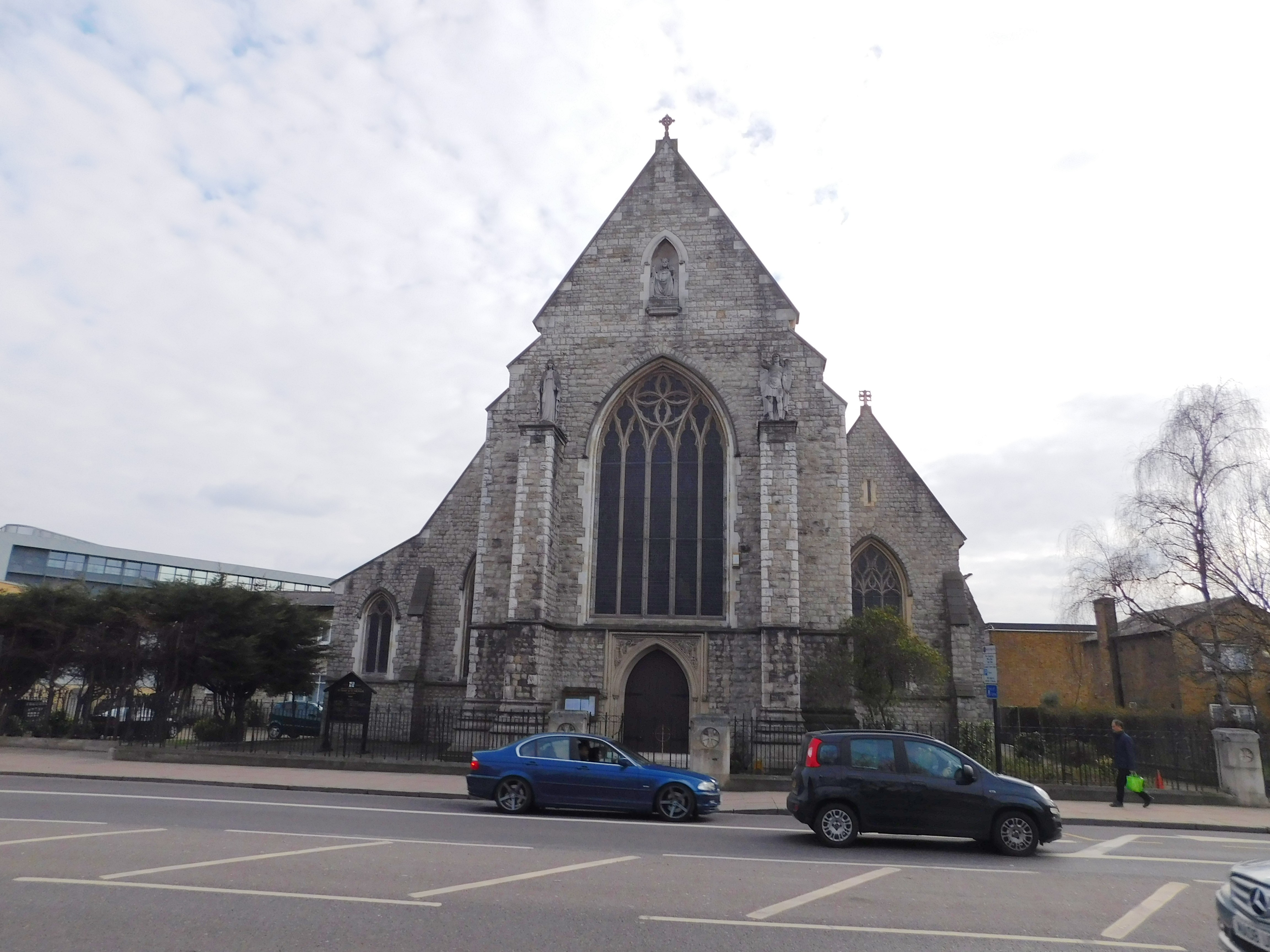
- The Church of St Mary and St Michael in 2018
- Church of St Mary and St Michael
- Denomination: Catholic

Architecture
- Heritage designation: Grade II listed
- Architect: William Wardell
- Style: Gothic Revival architecture
- Years built: 1852-1856

The Church of St Mary and St Michael is a Roman Catholic Church at 2 Lukin Street, Commercial Road, E1 0AA in the London Borough of Tower Hamlets. It is an active Roman Catholic church in the diocese of Westminster. The church is recorded in the National Heritage List for England as a designated Grade II listed building.

== History ==
Built between 1852–1856, The Church of St Mary and St Michael was the largest Roman Catholic church in London at the time. William Wardell, its architect, was a pupil of Augustus Pugin whose influence can be seen in its Gothic Revivalist design.

Father James Webb, the last priest in England prosecuted under the Penal laws, was the first Parish Priest of St Mary and St Michael's. Canon Timothy Ring, led the parish from 1904 until 1941, and was a well-known figure in East End London, his funeral was attended by Clement Attlee.
