= The Greater Britain =

Political manifesto written by Oswald Mosley for the British Union of Fascists

- Author: Oswald Mosley
- Genre: Political Manifesto
- Publisher: The British Union of Fascists, Sanctuary Press LTD
- Publication date: October 1, 1932
- Publication place: United Kingdom
- Pages: 137
- ISBN: 978-1913176235

The Greater Britain was a political manifesto written by the revolutionary British fascist leader Sir Oswald Mosley in 1932. The book served as the foundational program which launched the British Union of Fascists (BUF). The book rejects traditional parliamentary democracy in favor of an authoritarian corporate state and a self-sufficient imperial economy. The book emerged during the Great Depression, and it was seen as a solution for the economic challenges during the time. The book has 12 chapters, each chapter focuses on a different aspect of politics which the British Union of Fascists would attempt to change if they were in power. The BUF's Blackshirts took heavy inspiration from this book.

== Background and origins ==
The creation of The Greater Britain was directly linked to Mosley's dramatic departure from mainstream British politics. Mosley was originally a Labour politician, and he was drifting towards the political left. He gained the attention of both the Liberal Party, and the Labour Party for his foreign policy polemics, which advocated for a strong League of Nations and isolationism. After a 1931 trip to Italy, where Mosley had met with Benito Mussolini and other fascists, he returned to the United Kingdom with deep admiration to the economic policy of fascist Italy.

== Ideology and Core Tenants ==
The Greater Britain by Oswald Mosley being a political manifesto means that it expresses the ideology of the person writing the book. Oswald Mosley being a fascist wrote the book explaining his dream for a new Britain. The first chapter of the book, Creed and System, outlines the foundational ideology of the British Union of Fascists. Mosley argues that the traditional political parties in the United Kingdom are trapped in a cycle of decay, and there is no national stability or progress. Chapter two, The Corporate State, is about how Mosley thinks the government should operate. Mosley argues the government should run like a highly organized team, rather than a talking shop. This chapter has the core ideas of eliminating class conflict, introducing industrial voting, and using the state as a supreme authority. Chapter three, the State and the Citizen, is about how public life and private life would operate under his, or his party's rule. Contrary to many fascists at the time, Oswald Mosley argued for liberty in the private sector of life. Similar to other fascists, he maintains the fascist belief that the state should control public life. In the fourth chapter of the manifesto, the Foundation of Policy, the simple idea that the world is suffering from a massive paradox is portrayed. Chapter five, the Old Gangs Answer, attacks mainstream political parties, and mainstream politicians. The writings calls the idea of mainstream politics lazy, and a band-aid to fix a major economic problem, rather than a long-term solution. Chapter six, Building up the home market, Mosley advocates for complete economic self-sufficiency, or autarky. Mosley proposes using strict tariffs and trade-barriers to shield the home market from global financial volatility while mandating higher wages to boost domestic purchasing power. In Chapter seven, the Export Trade, Mosley talks about the need for Britain to focus on its home market, but its need for a tightly controlled, state-managed export plan to buy the foreign raw materials it cannot produce itself. This chapter explains how Britain would interact with the world economy. Chapter eight is called The Empire, and in it Mosley explains how Britain and its territories should combine into a single, self-sufficient super bloc to lock out foreign competition and achieve total independence from the global market. The ninth chapter of this book is titled Fascism and its Neighbors. In this chapter Mosley outlines a foreign policy which is isolationist, and is centered around a self-sufficient economy. Mosley wants to eliminate foreign competition, which he believes is a root cause of war. Mosley's tenth chapter, Finance, Industry and Science, argues that the financial system should serve domestic production, rather than speculative banking. Mosley points out how traditional banking has crippled the British economy, and he proposes that centralizing the banks to fund national infrastructure would save the British economy. Chapter number eleven, the Nation's Finance, explains the idea of the state's tax system being completely overhauled to reward productive work and penalize passive wealth or economic waste. Mosley argues that the existing British tax system was strangling the economy. The conclusion of his book, titled Conclusion, is an urgent call to action, it frames fascism not as just a set of political policies, but rather a spiritual test which will determine if Britain will rise to new heights, or if it will collapse into historical irrelevance. The main ideology of this manifesto is that the British Parliament is obsolete, and a barrier of national progress. Mosley outlines a blueprint for transforming the nation into an authoritarian, self-sufficient state organized around a "Corporate State" political model and an economically isolated empire. The text argues that replacing geographical voting with industrial representation (medical doctors vote on a representative for the medical field), and establishing a high-wage domestic market protected by tariffs would be the greatest solution for the struggles in Britain.

== Rhetorical and Linguistic Style ==
=== The Language of "Efficiency" and "Science" ===
In The Greater Britain by Sir Oswald Mosley, Mosley intentionally avoids the highly emotional, racialized, and populist rhetoric that characterized contemporary continental fascist texts, such as Adolf Hitler's Mein Kampf. Instead of using this style of writing, Mosley reflects on his background of being an aristocratic Parliamentarian and former government minister, Mosley adopted a style which historians describe as technocratic, urgent, and legalistic.

Rather than relying on appeals to national mysticism, the text frames fascism as a cold, logical science of governance. Mosley frequently utilized mechanical and industrial metaphors, comparing the British government to an "obsolete engine" which required modernization.

The book repeatedly uses words like efficiency, planning, machinery, and coordination. By using these words, Mosley attempted to appeal directly to the British middle-class.

To neutralize the negative connotation that was associated, and is still associated with an authoritarian regime, Mosley avoided terms like "tyranny." Mosley knew his audience, and he knew that if he used words that the majority found offensive or words the majority did not like, they would not listen to what he had to say. Mosley instead uses terms like "the elective dictatorship" or "dictatorship by consent." Mosley argues that granting absolute power to the executive was not an abandonment of liberty, rather it was the ultimate expression of the national will to survive the economic struggles they had been faced with.

=== Domestication of Fascist Concepts ===
A central strategy which had been used throughout the book was the "Britishing" of foreign fascist concepts. Mosley had deliberately distanced himself and his ideology from Italian or German imports by anchoring his arguments in British history and imperial tradition.

Mosley frames the corporate state not as a novel Italian invention, but as a return to the historic British guild system and the traditional authority of the Crown.

By using the title The Greater Britain, a phrase which had been historically associated with the expansion of liberal British influence, Mosley attempts to cloak a radical restructuring of the state in a familiar, patriotic, and imperial uniform.

== Revisions and Differences Between Editions ==
As the British Union of Fascists evolved from a technocratic pressure group into an aggressive, paramilitary street movement, the text The Greater Britain was modified. Comparing the original 1932 edition to the heavily revised 1934 and 1936 editions reveal the shifting tactical and ideological priorities of the party.

=== Shift from Technocracy to Militarism ===
The structural changes between the editions document a transition in how Sir Oswald Mosley chose to project the fascist authority to the British public. In the original 1932 edition which had been written immediately after Mosley departed from mainstream politics, the text reads as an unorthodox economic treatise. It relies heavily on policy arguments, macro-economic charts, and structural critiques of Parliament. This edition aimed at converting intellectuals and business leaders to his movement.

In the 1934 edition of the text, following the rapid growth of the British Blackshirts, who were the BUF's paramilitary wing, large sections of the introductory text and prefaces were rewritten. The tone shifts to an unyielding, militaristic style, placing much more emphasis on discipline, obedience, and the inevitability of a physical struggle against political opponents.

=== Policy Alterations and Removal of Content ===
To maintain party unity and mirror shifts in continental fascism, certain policy details from the 1932 text were altered or entirely removed in later editions.

The 1932 edition contained progressive-leaning clauses regarding mandatory worker profit-sharing within the corporate guilds. In the 1934 edition, these clauses had been significantly diluted or framed strictly as bonuses dependent on state-approved production quotas, which reassured wealthy industrial backers.

The original 1932 publication notibily lacked the anti-Semitism which later was a core belief of the BUF. As the party pivoted towards anti-Semitic campaigning in 1934 and 1935, new promotional prefaces and postscripts were appended to the book, so it would realign with the party's increasing anti-Semitism.

== See also ==
- Greater Britain Movement
- British Fascism
- Sir Oswald Mosley
