= Fascist Defence Force =

Paramilitary section of the British Union of Fascists

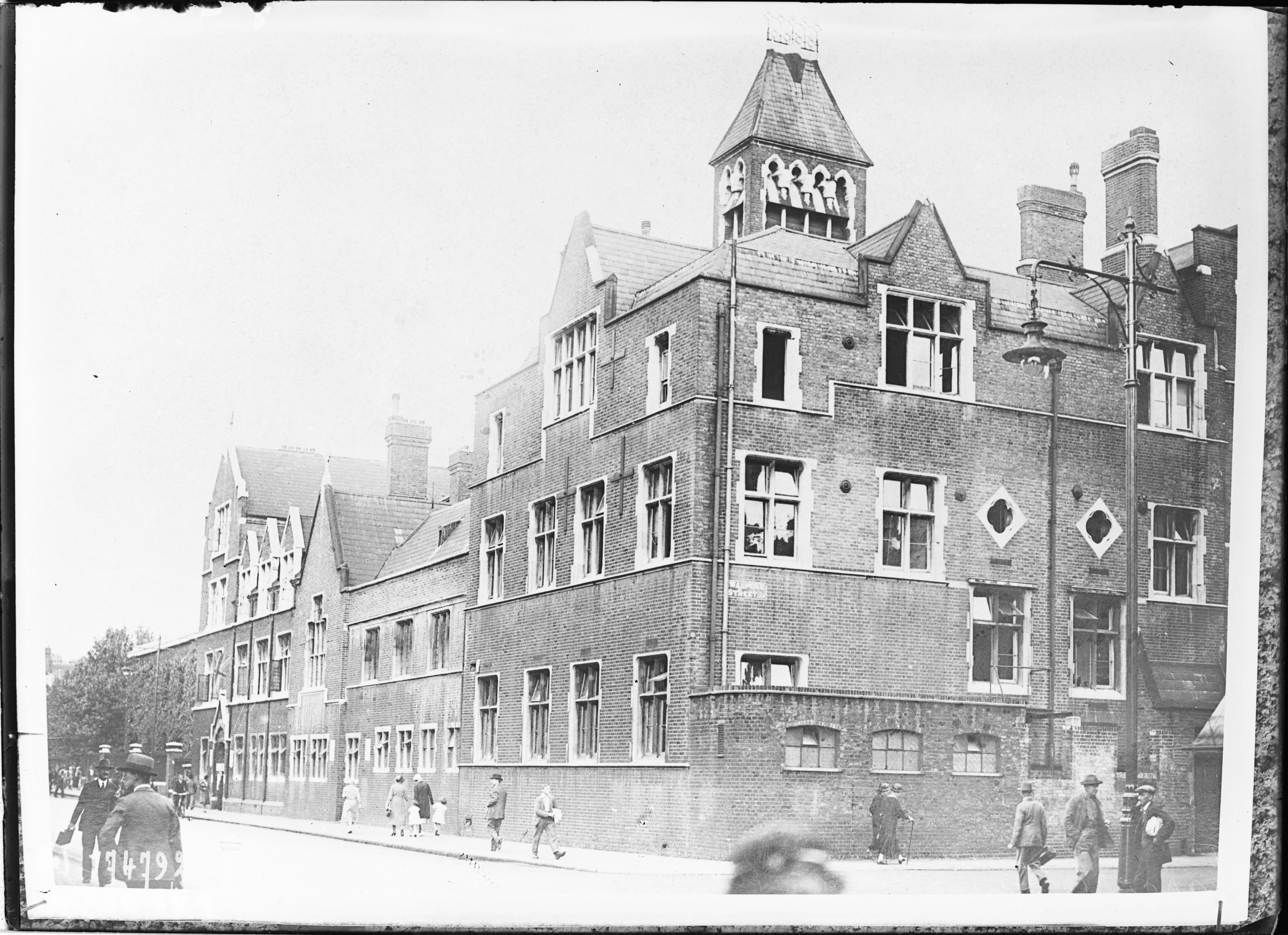
Black House in Chelsea - the BUF HQ, and barracks of the FDF.

The Fascist Defence Force (FDF) was the paramilitary section of the British Union of Fascists (BUF).

It was established in August 1933 by Oswald Mosley, after the BUF acquired its headquarters, Black House (formerly The Whitelands Teacher Training College) in King's Road, Chelsea. Black House could accommodate up to 5,000 people.

The Fascist Defence Force initially consisted of three hundred men wearing black shirts and black trousers (their shirts, modelled on Mosley's fencing jacket, were akin to polo neck sweaters) as well as six badges and stripes to denote rank. They also wore a red armband with the BUF symbol of a flash of lightning in a circle, representing "action within unity".

An elite unit within the Fascist Defence Force, the I Squad, served as Mosley's personal bodyguards; they also wore black fencing jackets, but with black leather breeches and boots. I Squad trained to quell disorder by armed opponents.

Ordinary members of the FDF were paid £1 per week on top of their accommodation, with members of I Squad receiving £3.

The Force maintained thirty motor vehicles, including five rapid transportation vans specially equipped with wire mesh windows and plating at the sides for protection against missiles, each with a seating capacity of 20.

The FDF was commanded by Eric Piercy, a Special Constabulary Inspector and ex-insurance agent; his second-in-command was Ian Dundas, a former Royal Navy officer.
