= St George in the East =

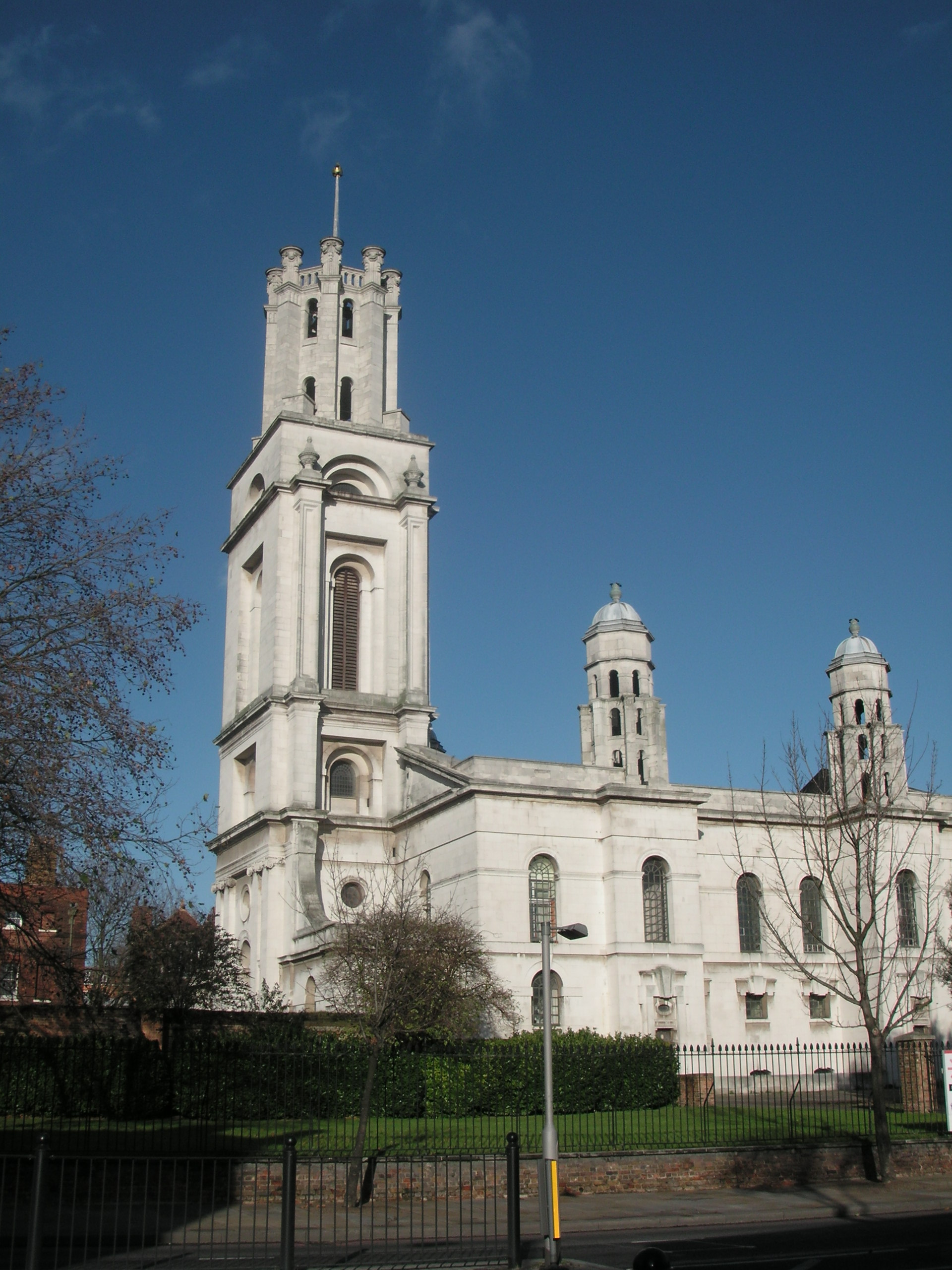
- St George in the East seen from the south
- St George in the East
- 51.5100°N 0.0598°W
- Location: Cannon Street Road, London, E1
- Country: England
- Denomination: Church of England
- Churchmanship: Anglo-Catholic

History
- Dedication: Saint George

Architecture
- Heritage designation: Grade I
- Architect: Nicholas Hawksmoor
- Style: Classical (with Palladian and Byzantine elements)
- Years built: 1714–1729

Administration
- Division: Stepney Episcopal Area (Archdeaconry of Hackney)
- Diocese: London
- Parish: St George in the East

Clergy
- Dean: Dean of Tower Hamlets
- Priest(s): Fr Richard Springer (Rector), Fr Angus Ritchie (Assistant Priest), Caitlin Harland (Curate)

St George-in-the-East is an Anglican Church dedicated to Saint George; located on Cannon Street Road, between The Highway and Cable Street, in the East End of London. Behind the church lies St George's Gardens, the original graveyard.

== History ==
=== Parishes ===
The parish of St George in the East has been used for two forms of parish (areas of land) surrounding the church, both of which originally covered the same area. This area had previously been known as Wapping-Stepney (meaning the part of Wapping within Stepney) to distinguish it from Wapping-Whitechapel (the part of Wapping within Whitechapel) which later became the parish of St John of Wapping.

The two originally coterminous parishes of St George were the ecclesiastical parish, which remains and a Civil parish counterpart, a third tier of local government. In 1836, the existing civil parish of St George in the East was constituted as a Poor Law parish under the Poor Law Amendment Act 1834. This civil parish ceded its dwindling purposes to the Metropolitan Borough of Stepney, so was abolished in 1927.

=== Church building and congregation ===
The church is one of six Hawksmoor churches in London, England. It was built from 1714 to 1729, with funding from the 1711 Act of Parliament. The church was designated a Grade I listed building in 1950.

The first rector, in 1729, was William Simpson, who was succeeded in 1764 by Herbert Mayo. Mayo was regarded as a very humane and enlightened person who took great interest in the wellbeing of local people, in particular the settled and transient seafaring black and mixed race parts of the community. It was said of Mayo "I suppose no clergyman in England ever baptised so many black men and mulatoes...the attachment of these poor people to him is very great".

In the 1850s, Archibald Campbell Tait, then Bishop of London, appointed a Low Church lecturer, which was contrary to the High Church attitude of the rector, curate and congregation. Forms of dissent included catcalls and horn blowing, and some male members of the congregation went into the church smoking their pipes, keeping their hats on, and leading barking dogs. Refuse was thrown onto the altar. The church was closed for a while in 1859, and the rector, owing to his poor health, was persuaded by the author Thomas Hughes to hand over his duties to a locum.

The church was hit by a bomb during the Second World War Blitz on London's docklands in May 1941. The original interior was destroyed by the fire, but the walls and distinctive "pepper-pot" towers stayed up. In 1964 a modern church interior was constructed inside the existing walls, and a new flat built under each corner tower. A ring of eight replacement bells, cast at the Whitechapel Bell Foundry was put in place at this time.

Ian Nairn wrote of it in his 1966 guide to London: "A ruin among ruins, in the lost part of Stepney, south of Commercial Road. The old life has gone or been deliberately killed, the new has not yet come up with any pattern or buildings worth twopence. It makes no difference to Hawksmoor's bizarre poetry. This is probably the hardest building to describe in London ... This is a stage somewhere beyond fantasy, which is always comfortably related to common sense: it is the more-than-real world of the drug addict's dream."

== Community work ==
In May 2015, the church entered into a partnership with the Centre for Theology and Community (CTC), an ecumenical charity which is based in its East Crypt. Anglican clergy working for CTC now serve the parish, and the second floor is the home to the Community of St George, a group of lay Christians who assist in the worship and mission of the church.

== Popular culture ==
It appeared in the 1980 film The Long Good Friday starring Bob Hoskins. It also appeared in S02E01 of Killing Eve.

== Gallery ==
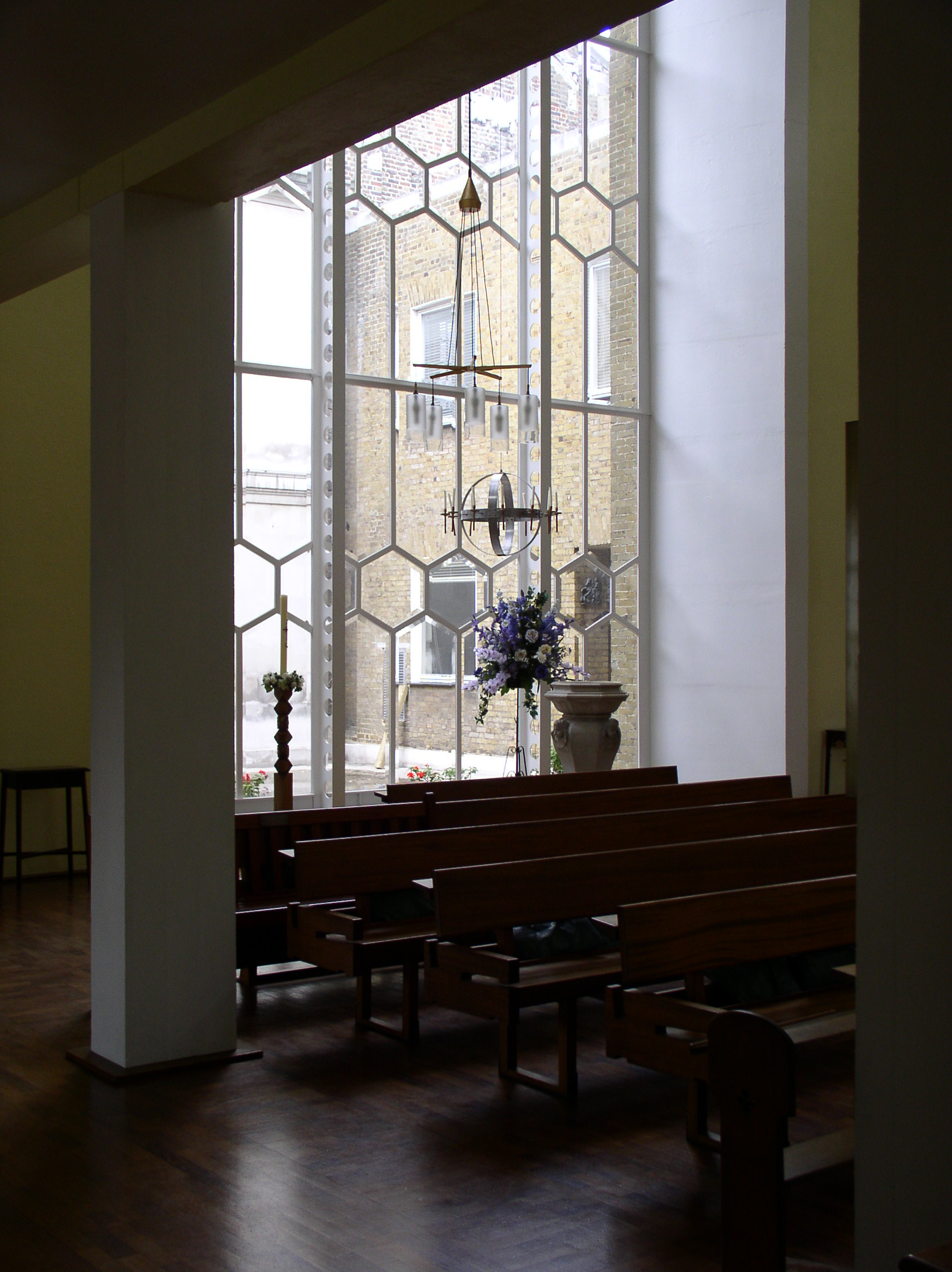
Looking West from inside

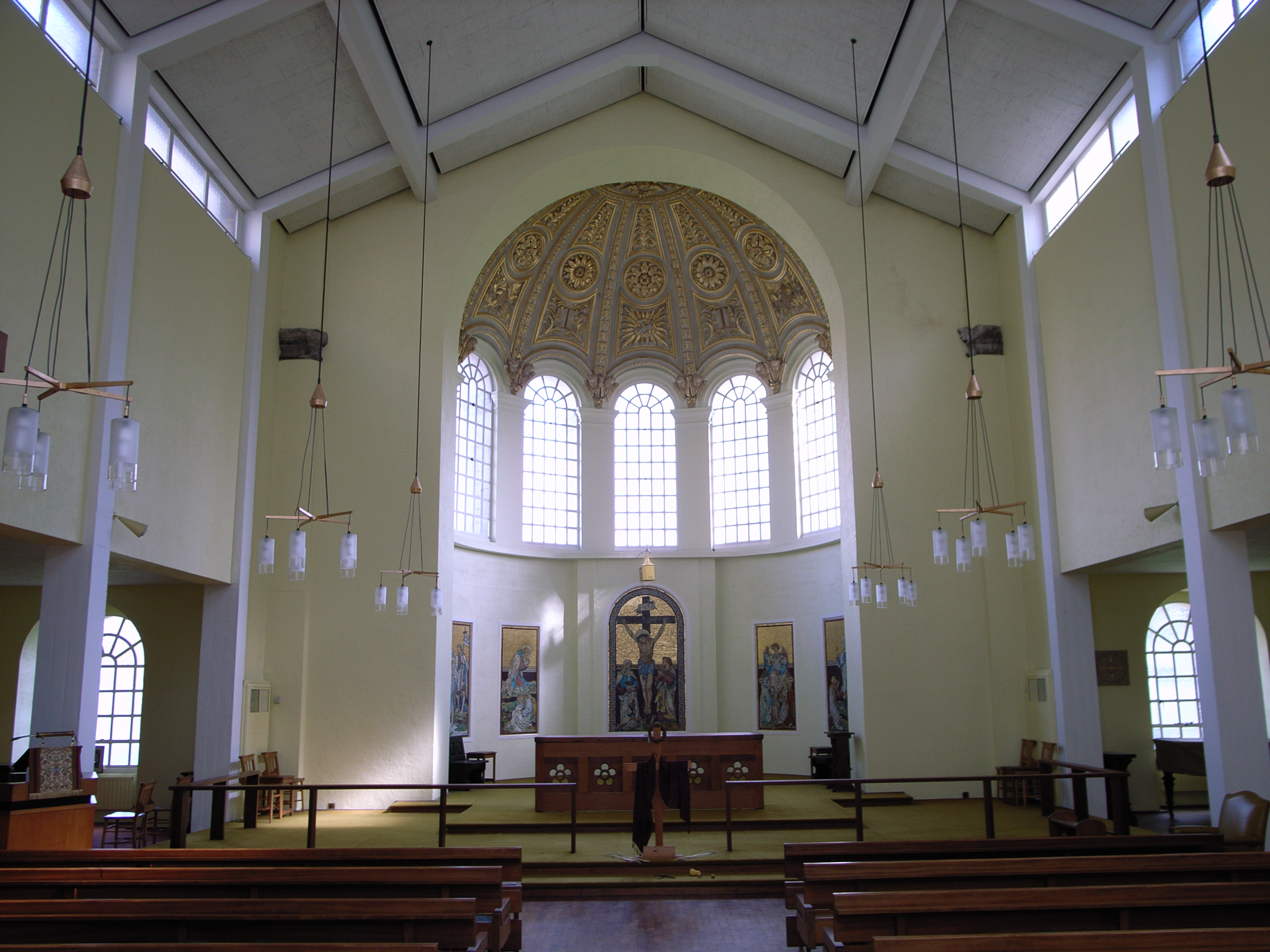
The nave looking East

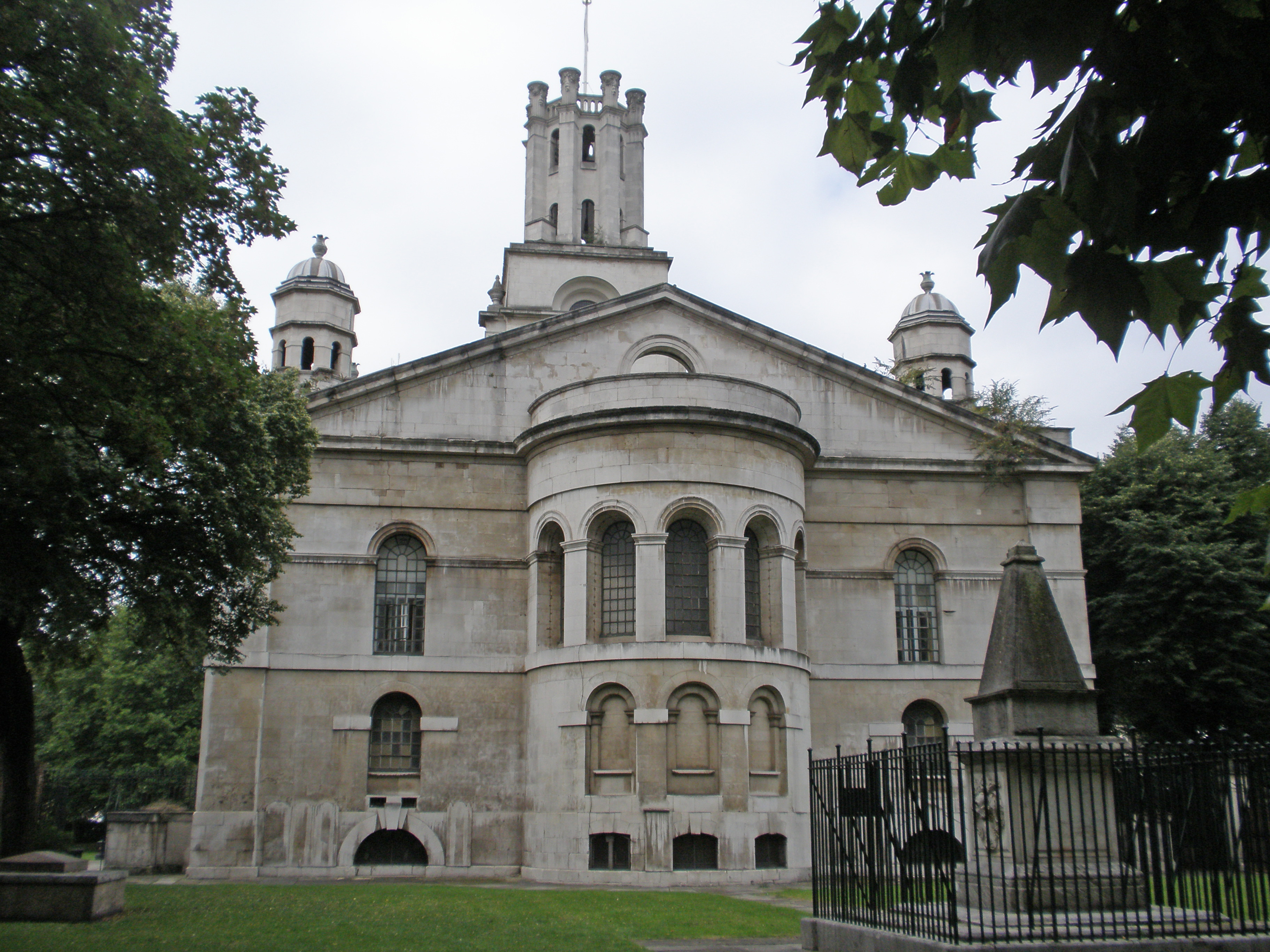
Exterior from the East

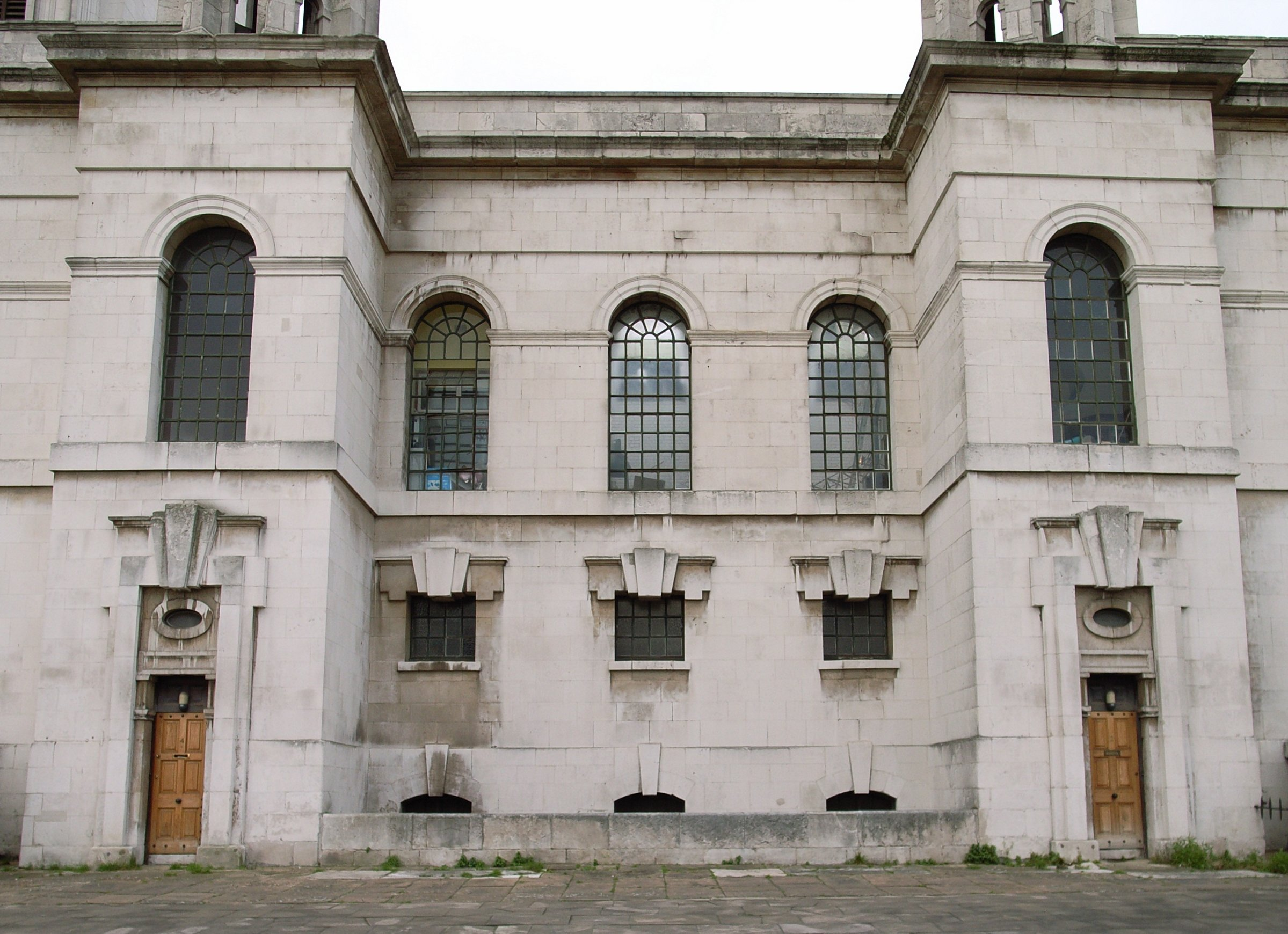
Detailed view from the South

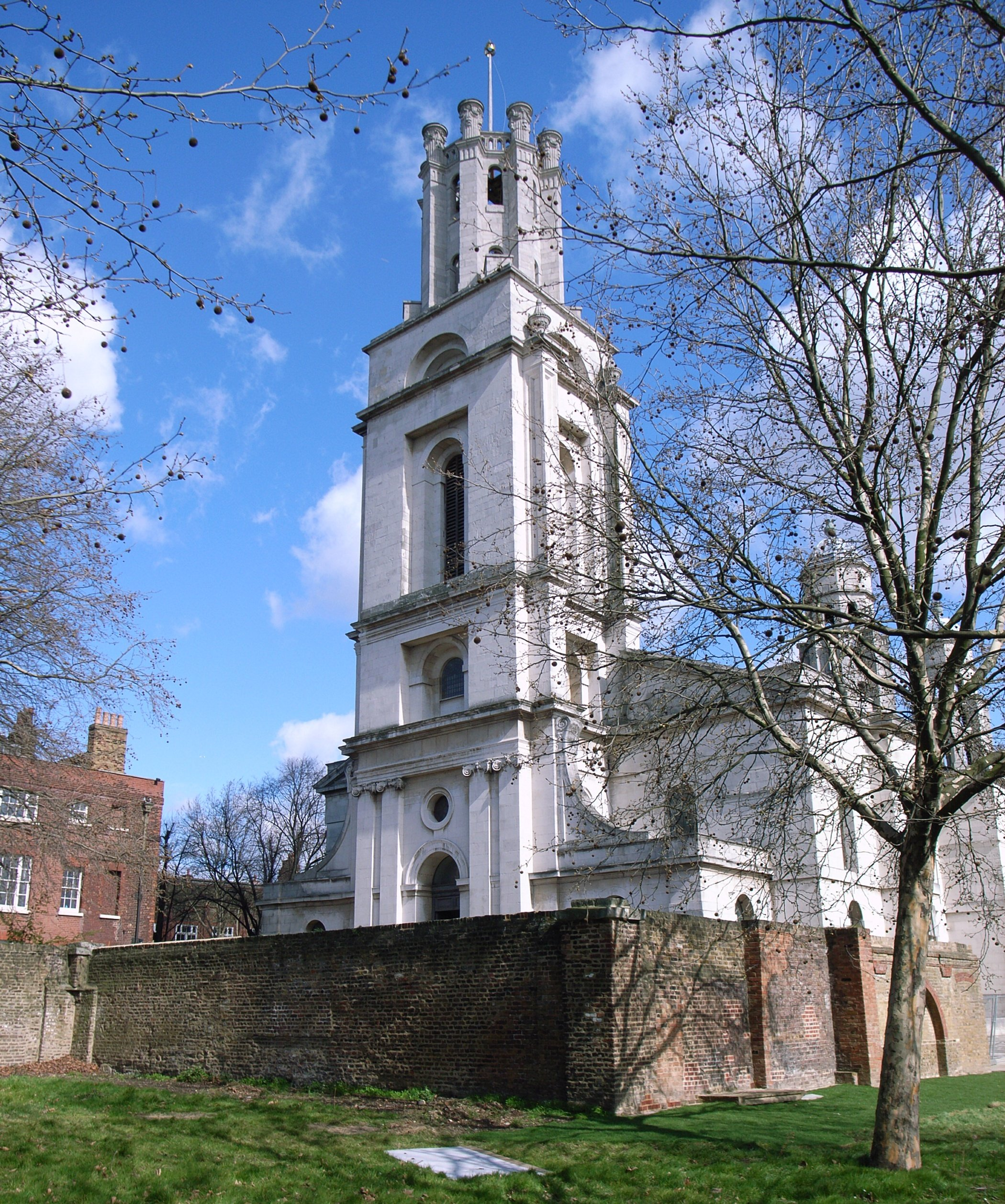
West front

== See also ==
- List of churches and cathedrals of London
- Stepney Historical Trust
- All Saints' Church, Pontefract – a church ruined in the English Civil War with a modern church constructed within
