= Stepney =

Area of London, England

Coordinates: 51.5152°N 0.0462°W

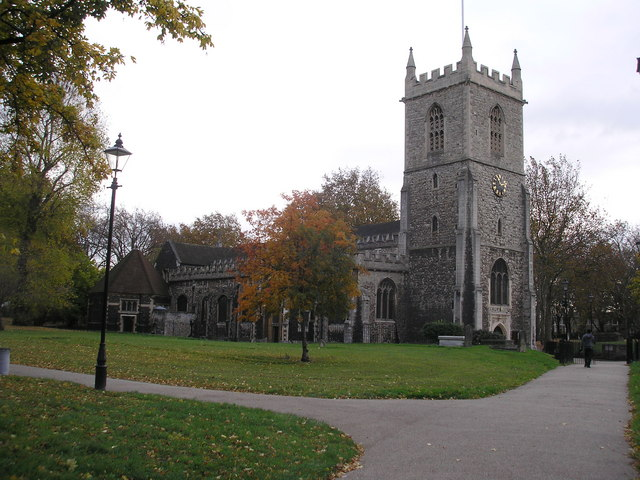
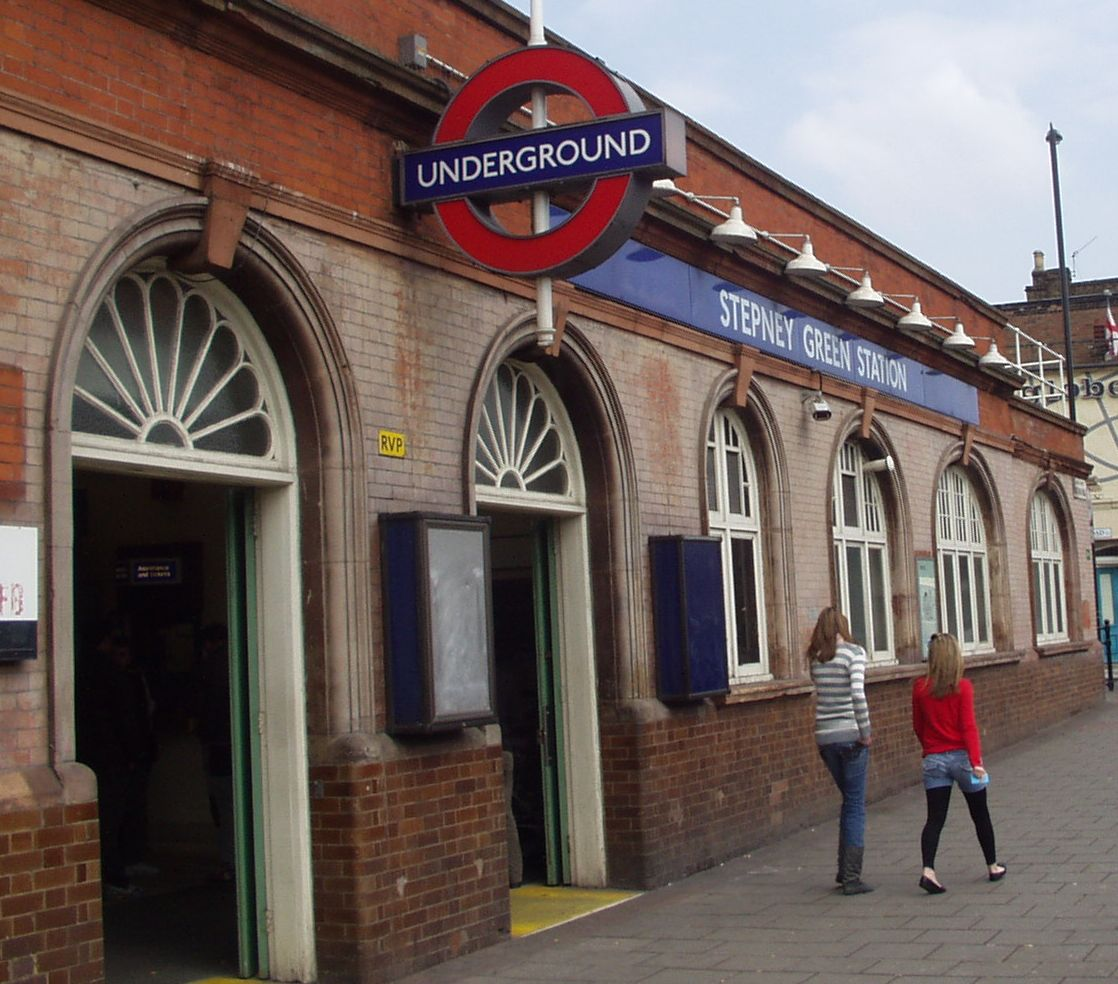
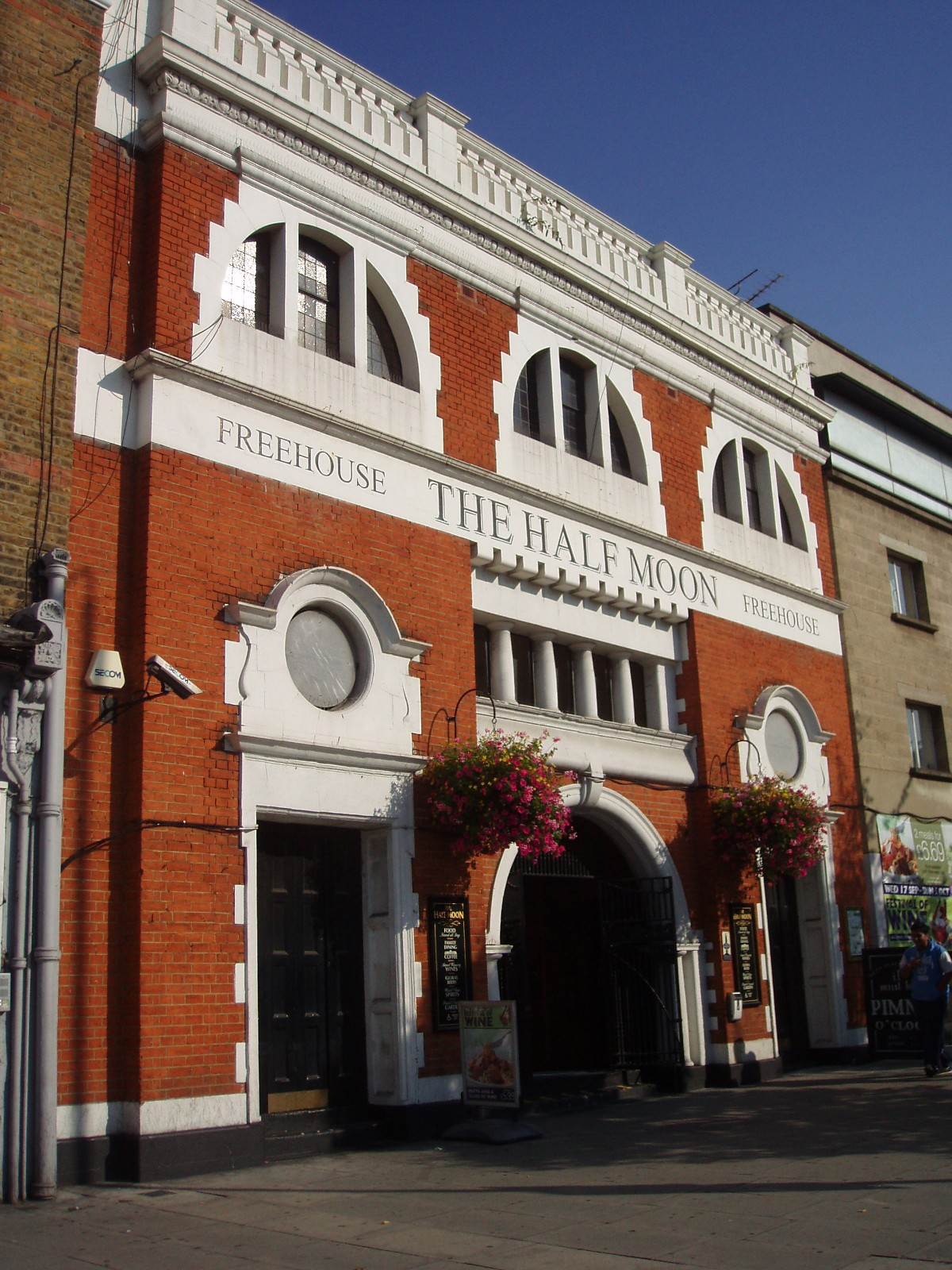
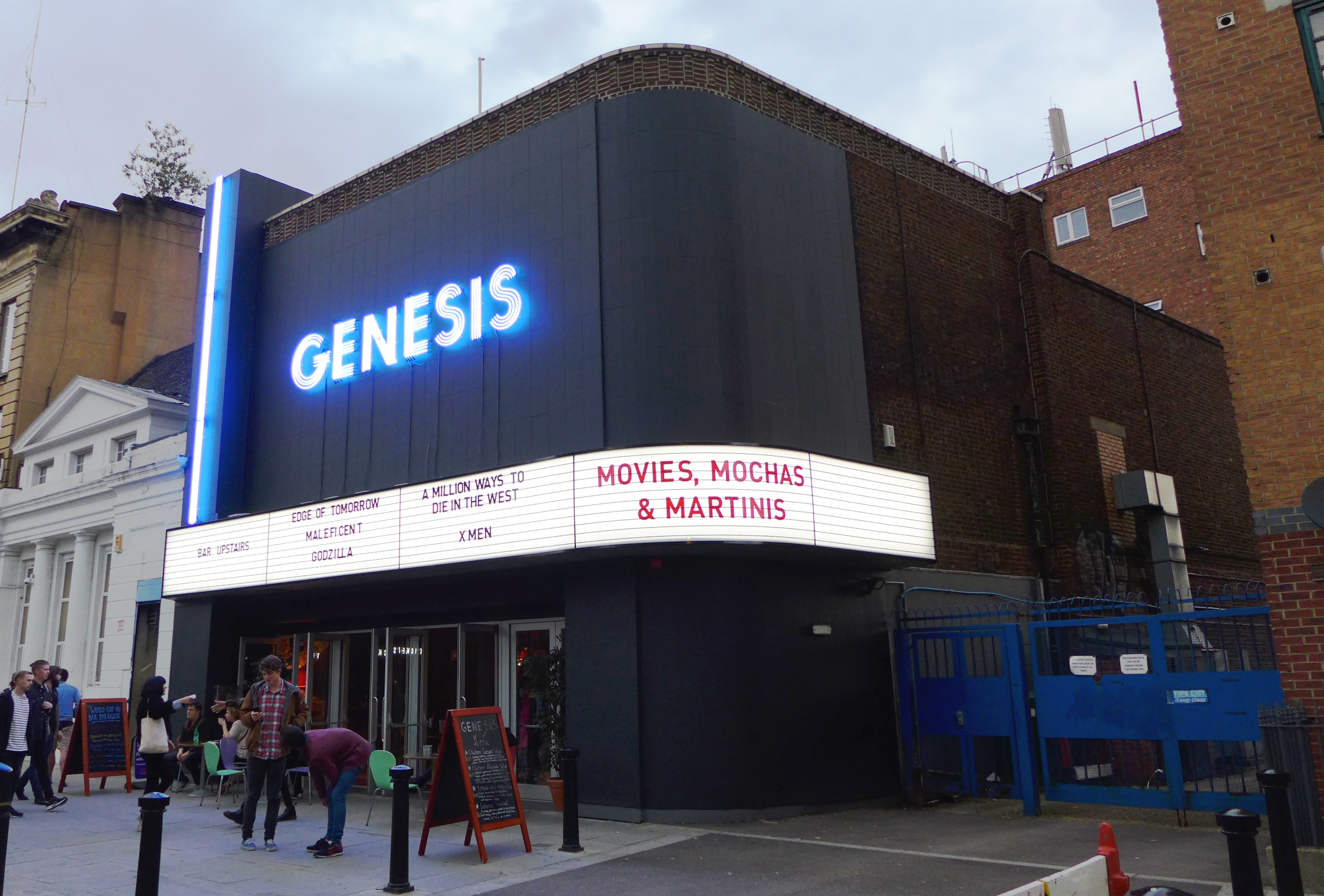
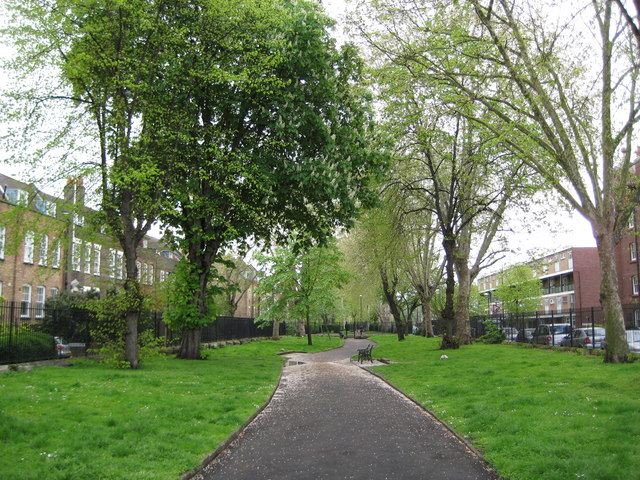
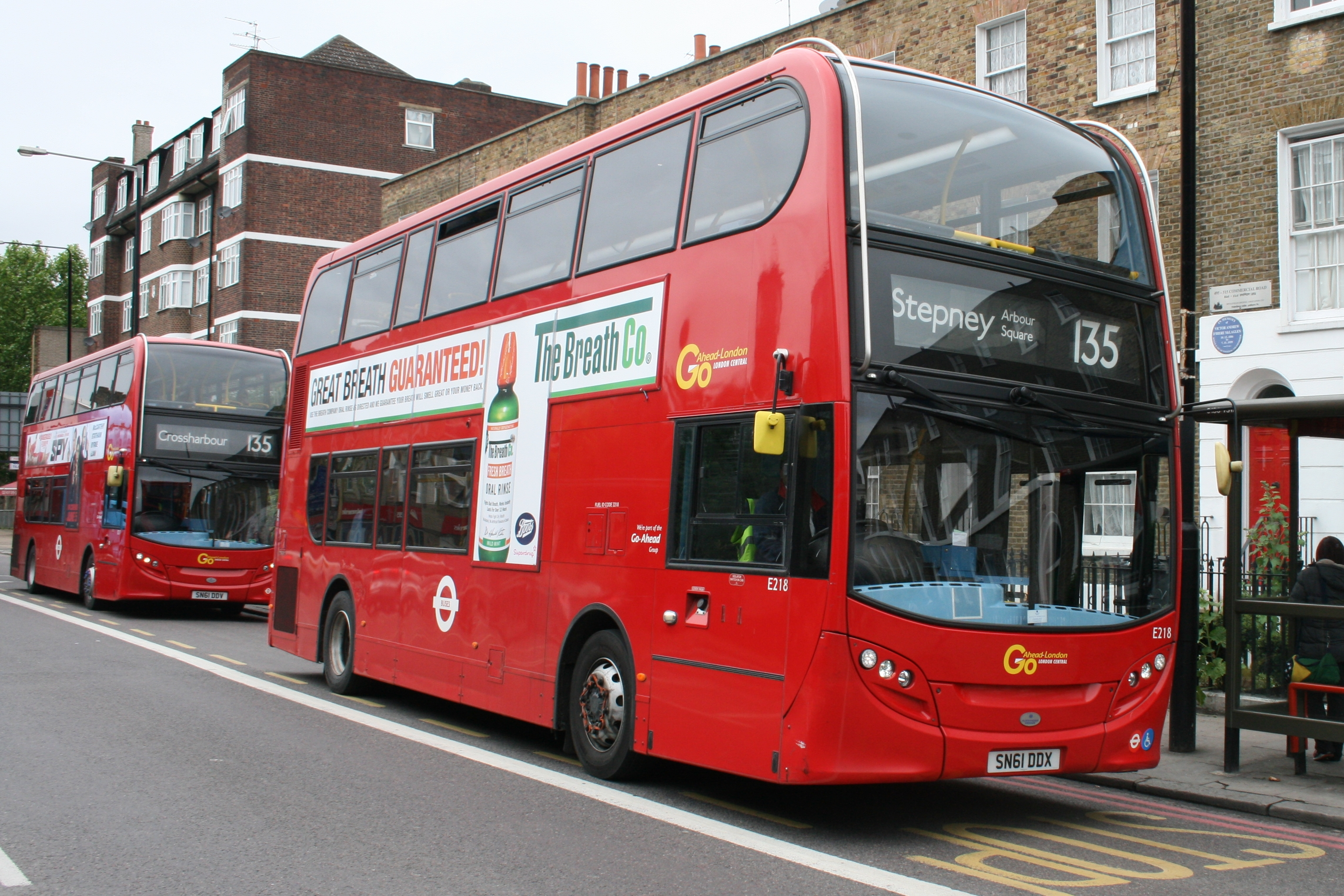
- Clockwise from top left: St. Dunstan's Church; Stepney Green tube station; Genesis cinema; route 135 at Arbour Square; Stepney Green; the Half Moon pub.

- Location within Greater London
- Population: 16,238 (2011 census. St Dunstan's and Stepney Green Ward)
- OS grid reference: TQ355814
  - Charing Cross: 3.6 mi (5.8 km) WSW
- London borough: Tower Hamlets
- Ceremonial county: Greater London
- Region: London
- Country: England
- Sovereign state: United Kingdom
- Post town: LONDON
- Postcode district: E1, E14
- Dialling code: 020
- Police: Metropolitan
- Fire: London
- Ambulance: London
- UK Parliament: Bethnal Green and Stepney
- London Assembly: City and East

Stepney is an area in the London Borough of Tower Hamlets in the East End of London. Stepney is no longer officially defined, and is usually used to refer to a relatively small area. However, for much of its history the place name was applied to a much larger manor and parish, which covered most of the inner East End.

Stepney Green Park is a remnant of a larger area of Common Land formerly known as Mile End Green.

The area was built up rapidly during the 19th century, mainly to accommodate immigrant workers and poor families displaced from London. It developed a reputation for poverty, overcrowding, violence and political dissent. It was severely damaged during the Blitz, with over a third of housing destroyed; and then, in the 1960s, slum clearance and development replaced most residential streets with tower blocks and modern housing estates. Some Georgian architecture and Victorian era terraced housing remain such as Arbour Square, the eastern side of Stepney Green, and the streets around Matlock Street.

== History ==
=== Toponymy ===
The first surviving record of the place name is from around 1000 AD as Stybbanhyð, "Stybba's hyð"; hyð developed into hithe (meaning landing-place) in modern English, so "Stybba's landing-place". The parish of Stebbing in Essex also appears to have taken its name from an individual called Stybba. The hithe itself is thought to have been at Ratcliff, just under one-half mile (800 metres) south of St Dunstan's Church.

=== Changing scope ===
Historically, Stepney was a very large manor and ancient parish which covered most of what would become the East End. From 1900 to 1965 the place-name was applied to the Metropolitan Borough of Stepney, which in 1965 became the south-west part of the new London Borough of Tower Hamlets which currently administers the area. There is currently a Stepney episcopal area in the Anglican Diocese of London, which covers the London boroughs of Hackney, Islington and Tower Hamlets, and has its own suffragan bishop.

The area of Stepney has had no local government definition since 1965, but is used to refer to the whole former parish and also to a relatively small area within it.

=== Manor and ancient parish ===
For hundreds of years the term Stepney referred to the Manor and Ancient Parish of Stepney, with the first contemporary record of the manor around the year 1000. The manor covered an area stretching from the eastern edge of the City of London to the Lea and from Stamford Hill down to the Thames; in this way covering an area equivalent to the modern borough of Tower Hamlets, as well as the district of Hackney (in the wider modern borough of the same name).

The origins of the manor (and vill) are not known, but its large size, relatively rich soils and position so close to the walls of London have led to suggestions that the manor was the foundation grant of land made to the Bishop of London to support the creation of the new diocese of London (the diocese was coterminous with the Kingdom of Essex which it served, and of which Stepney was part) at the time of the establishment of St Paul's Cathedral in 604 AD.

St Dunstan's church is recorded as being founded (or more likely rebuilt) by Dunstan himself in 952, and as the first church in the manor, will have served the whole of that landholding. The proto-parish of Stepney will therefore have covered the same area as the manor.

Hackney appears to have been an early daughter parish of Stepney; a church at Hackney is first mentioned in 1275 but is likely to have been in place before then. From the 1100s, the development and improvement in enforcement of Canon law made it difficult to form new parishes, so Hackney seems likely to have formed an independent parish in the 12th century, with the district remaining a sub-manor of Stepney.

It was usual for one or more manors to form a parish, but the manor of Stepney's great size meant that this was reversed, with two parishes (Stepney and Hackney) serving the single manor of Stepney. For local government purposes, the parish sub-divided into hamlets.

==== Manor ====
The Domesday Book survey of 1086 gives the name as Stibanhede and says that the land was held by the Bishop of London and was 32 hides large, mainly used for ploughing, meadows, woodland for 500 pigs, and 4 mills. The survey recorded 183 households; 74 of villeins who ploughed the land, 57 of cottars who assisted the villeins in return for a hut or cottage and 52 of bordars. This is estimated to have given the manor a total population of around a thousand people.

Bishop William held this land in demesne, in the manor of Stepney, on the day on which King Edward was alive and dead. In the same vill Ranulph Flambard holds 3½ hides of the bishop.

The Bishop of London held many other estates around London, and one of them, heavily wooded Hornsey, was attached to Stepney as a remote exclave for a time (it was common practice for wooded exclaves to be attached to more intensely farmed and densely populated estates in that period). The sub-manor of Hornsey was not part of the original territory of Stepney but was subsequently attached as an administrative convenience, and detached once more around the late 13th century. The earliest record of the district's Manor house, is from 1207, but the Bishop may have had a home in the Manor long before. The house was first known as Bishopswood, and later Bishops Hall or Bonner Hall, and was on a site in Bethnal Green later occupied by the London Chest Hospital. Edward VI passed Stepney to the Wentworth family, and thence to their descendant, the Earl of Cleveland. The Manors of Stepney and Hackney were linked, until they passed into separate ownership in the 1660s.

The system of copyhold, whereby land was leased to tenants for terms as short as seven years, prevailed throughout the manor. This severely limited scope for improvement of the land and new building until the estate was broken up in the 19th century.

==== Church and parish ====
St Dunstan's Church was founded (or rebuilt) around 952, by St Dunstan himself when he was Bishop of London, and therefore also Lord of the Manor of Stepney. Many bishops lived in the manor and Dunstan may have done the same. The church was dedicated to Dunstan after he was canonised in 1029, making him the patron saint of Stepney. The bells of the church, cast at the Whitechapel Bell Foundry, appear in the nursery rhyme, Oranges and Lemons

" 'When will that be'? say the bells of Stepney"

The church is known as "The Mother Church of the East End" as the very large parish covered most of what would become inner East London, before population growth led to the creation of a large number of daughter parishes. It is also known as "The Church of the High Seas" due to its traditional maritime connections. In 1720 the historian John Strype wrote that Stepney (together with its daughter parishes) should be esteemed a province rather than a parish, due to its large population, area and the diversity of urban, rural and maritime industries.

Stepney formed a large Ancient Parish in the Tower division of the Ossulstone hundred of Middlesex. The parish included the hamlets of Mile End Old Town, Mile End New Town, Ratcliff, Wapping-Stepney, Bow, Shadwell, Bethnal Green, Limehouse and Poplar. The Hamlets were territorial sub-divisions (as opposed to small villages), which ultimately became independent daughter parishes.

==== Ties with Shoreditch ====
The origin of the neighbouring parish of Shoreditch is obscure, but it primarily served the manors of Hoxton and Haggerston, both manors recorded at Domesday in 1086, together with a part of the Manor of Stepney. The parish church, St Leonard's, Shoreditch, was built on land that was part of the Manor of Stepney. Parcels of land in Hackney Marshes (within the Manor of Stepney) long had a role in maintaining a lamp at St Leonards church.

The manor of Hoxton, or a manor called Hoxton, was in Shoreditch, yet in 1352 is recorded as part of the parish of Hackney. It is not clear if or how these links led to the inclusion of the parish of Shoreditch in the Tower Division.

==== Customs and obligations ====
The Manor of Stepney was held by the Bishop of London, but the Constable of the Tower of London had important rights and responsibilities in the area. The Constable had responsibilities for the Thames below the Tower and for the care of parts of the Lea. In return the people of the area helped garrison the Tower. The early origin of these arrangements is obscure and the first surviving record of the military obligation dates from 1554, but is thought to be much older, with varying estimates in the post-Norman medieval period. These arrangements evolved into the creation of the Tower Division, also known as the Tower Hamlets.

The manor was unusual in practising the gavelkind method of inheritance, a custom largely limited to Kent.

St Dunstan's has a long association with the sea, with the parish of Stepney being responsible for registration of British maritime births, marriages and deaths until the 19th century. From the Tudor era onwards, the parish-level was responsible for mitigating the poverty of people born in the area. Stepney's additional responsibility for those born at sea was something of a burden.

This maritime association is remembered in the old rhyme:

"He who sails on the wide sea, is a parishioner of Stepney"

==== Break-up of the ancient parish ====
The rapid growth in population meant that over time the parish was broken up. Hackney is thought to have become independent in the 12th century, Whitechapel in the 14th and Bromley in the 16th. Some sub-divisions for instance those that form Bethnal Green, Bow and Poplar are known to have been based on pre-existing hamlets forming new daughter parishes. Such parish divisions were unusual and required an act of Parliament.

From 1819 the rump of Stepney consisted of three hamlets; Mile End New Town (which was detached from the rest), Ratcliffe and Mile End Old Town (which included St Dunstan's church). This residual parish was 830 acres (340 ha) in extent.

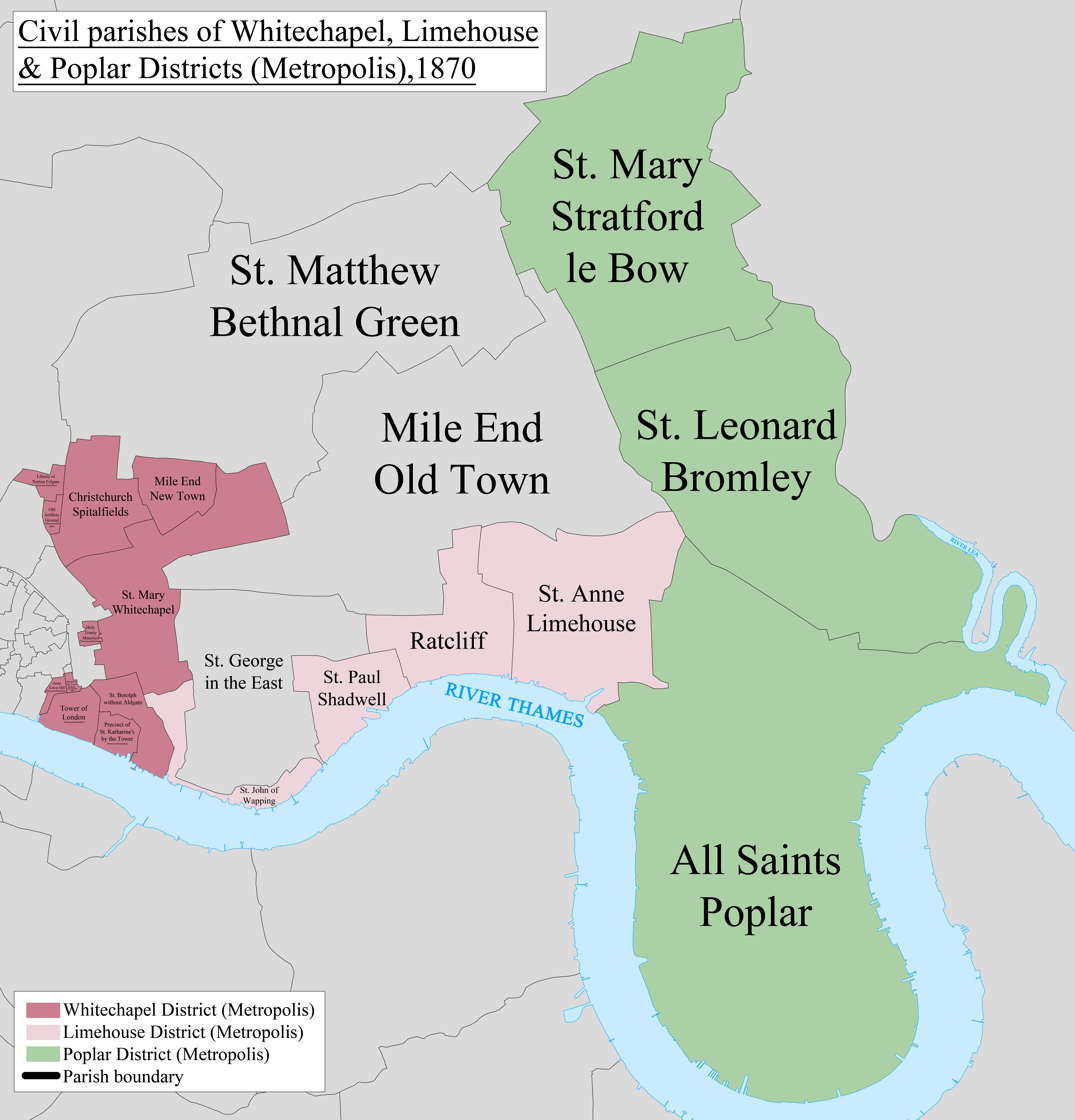
A map showing the 1870 boundaries of parishes which had been split from Stepney (excluding Hackney)

Until 1837, the boundaries of English civil and Church of England ecclesiastical boundaries were identical, but after that the Church of England sub-divided its parishes to suit local needs and circumstances, especially in densely populated areas such as Stepney, and the civil and ecclesiastical boundaries differed from that point on. By 1890 the ancient parish was divided between 67 ecclesiastical parishes (a number later greatly reduced) which had little relation to the civil parish boundaries.

In 1866 the rump civil parish of Stepney came to an end when its three component hamlets (Mile End New Town, Ratcliff and Mile End Old Town) became independent civil parishes.

=== Events ===
==== Stepney Parliament ====
In 1299, during the reign of Edward I, a parliament was held in Stepney at the home of Henry le Walleis. The location of his home is uncertain but is thought to be close to St Dunstan's church. The Stepney Parliament confirmed and reissued the Magna Carta (also known as the Charter of Liberties), and it is the Stepney version of Magna Carta that is in the modern statute book.

==== Stepney Feasts ====
The 1600s and 1700s saw a long annual tradition known as the Cockney's Feast, later also known as the Stepney Feast. The event, managed by the Stepney Society was a way of raising money to apprentice Stepney boys into the maritime trades, for instance as sailors. The area was regarded as producing exceptional seamen, as the historian John Strype noted:

"It is further to be remarked that the Parish of Stepney, on the Southern Parts of it especially, that it is one of the greatest Nurseries of Navigation and Breeders of Seamen in England, the most serviceable Men in the Nation; without which England could not be England for they are its Strength and Wealth."

— John Strype

The event was typically held on a convenient Saturday on or around 19 May, the feast day of St Dunstan, the patron saint of Stepney. The meal was preceded by a service at St Dunstan's church.

In his 'A Survey of the Cities of London and Westminster' of 1720, the historian and clergyman John Strype described the course of the event in his day. Eight Stewards would be chosen each year, sometimes men who as a boy had benefitted from the charity. At the initial church service, a sermon would be given by a locally born clergyman – Strype said that he had had the honour on several occasions.

There was then a procession led by beneficiaries of the scheme and "the eight Stewards and the rest of the Natives commonly take a Walk with Officers and Musick playing before them, through Limehouse and Ratcliff, and so return back to the King's Head overagainst the Church; and there dine plentifully and friendly together" Strype thought that Stepney was an unusually charitable place with more alms houses than any parish he knew of.

The event was discontinued in 1784 after the fundraising was taken on by the Marine Society, a charity which had the resources to apprentice boys beyond the East End.

An annual Barbados equivalent of the Feast was also held, with invitations limited to those born within the sound of Bow Bells.

==== Urban development ====
At the turn of the 16th century Stepney was largely rural. The theologian and humanist philosopher Erasmus was a friend of John Colet, the vicar of St Dunstans's church, who was a great influence on him. Ahead of a stay with Colet, Erasmus wrote of Stepney "I come to drink your fresh air, to drink yet deeper of your rural peace". About the same time Sir Thomas More wrote "wheresoever you look, the earth yieldeth you a pleasant prospect."

Much of the subsequent urbanisation of the area was driven by the maritime trades along the river, as well as ribbon development along the Mile End Road. Other factors included the development of London's docks and railways, combined with slum clearance, which pushed the displaced poor and various immigrants looking for work into cheap housing being built in the area.

The Trinity Green Almshouses were built in 1695 to provide housing for retired sailors. They are the oldest almshouses in Central London.

Malplaquet House is named after the Battle of Malplaquet, one of the main battles of the War of the Spanish Succession, which took place in France in 1709. However, it is not known whether this naming came from the Jewish widow of the London merchant, who made his living selling war salvage, or from a later resident, the military surgeon Edward Lee. It was home to a variety of small businesses including a bookmaker and a printer, before being occupied in 1910 by the Union of Stepney Ratepayers.

The Leonard Montefiore memorial fountain on Stepney Green is named for a young writer and philanthropist, Leonard Montefiore, who at the time of his death in 1879 was known for his philanthropic work in the East End of London. Montefiore attended Balliol College, Oxford, where his posthumous memoir reports that he was a devotee of John Ruskin. Whilst at Balliol he became a friend of Oscar Wilde, who after Montefiore's death allegedly proposed to his sister Charlotte. He was also influenced by Arnold Toynbee and Benjamin Jowett. Montefiore was chief assistant to Samuel Barnett in his work regarding the extension of Oxford University to London, and was secretary of the Tower Hamlets branch of the Society for the Extension of University Teaching. The Jewish Encyclopedia says "Montefiore was associated with many philanthropic movements, especially with the movement for women's emancipation." Montefiore died at Newport, Rhode Island, aged 27. According to the Women's rights activist Emily Faithfull in her book "Three Visits to America" published in 1884 Montefiore died "While he was visiting the United States, in order to see for himself what could be learned from the political and social condition of the people, must ever be deplored. The world can ill afford to lose men of such deep thought and energetic action." The memorial fountain has the following poem engraved on its side:

"Clear brain and sympathetic heart,
A spirit on flame with love for man,
Hands quick to labour, slow to part,
If any good since time began,
A soul can fashion such souls can."

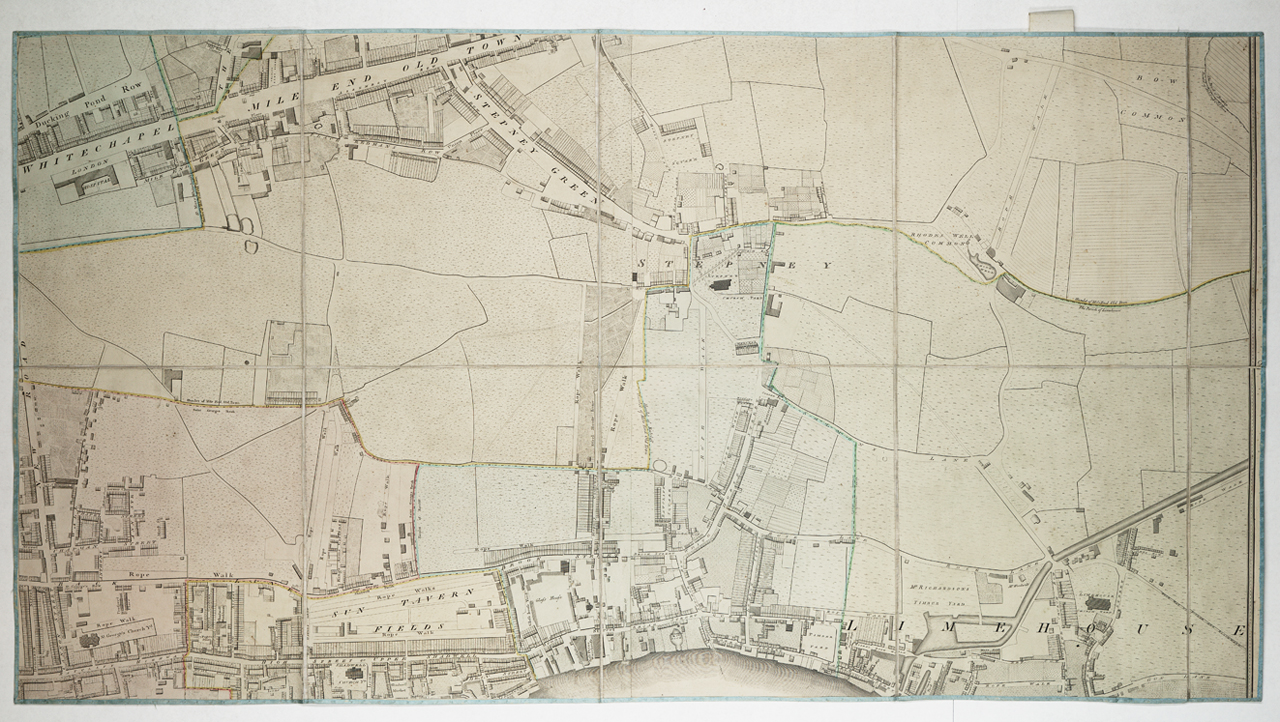
Map of 1792 of Stepney and around, when it was countryside

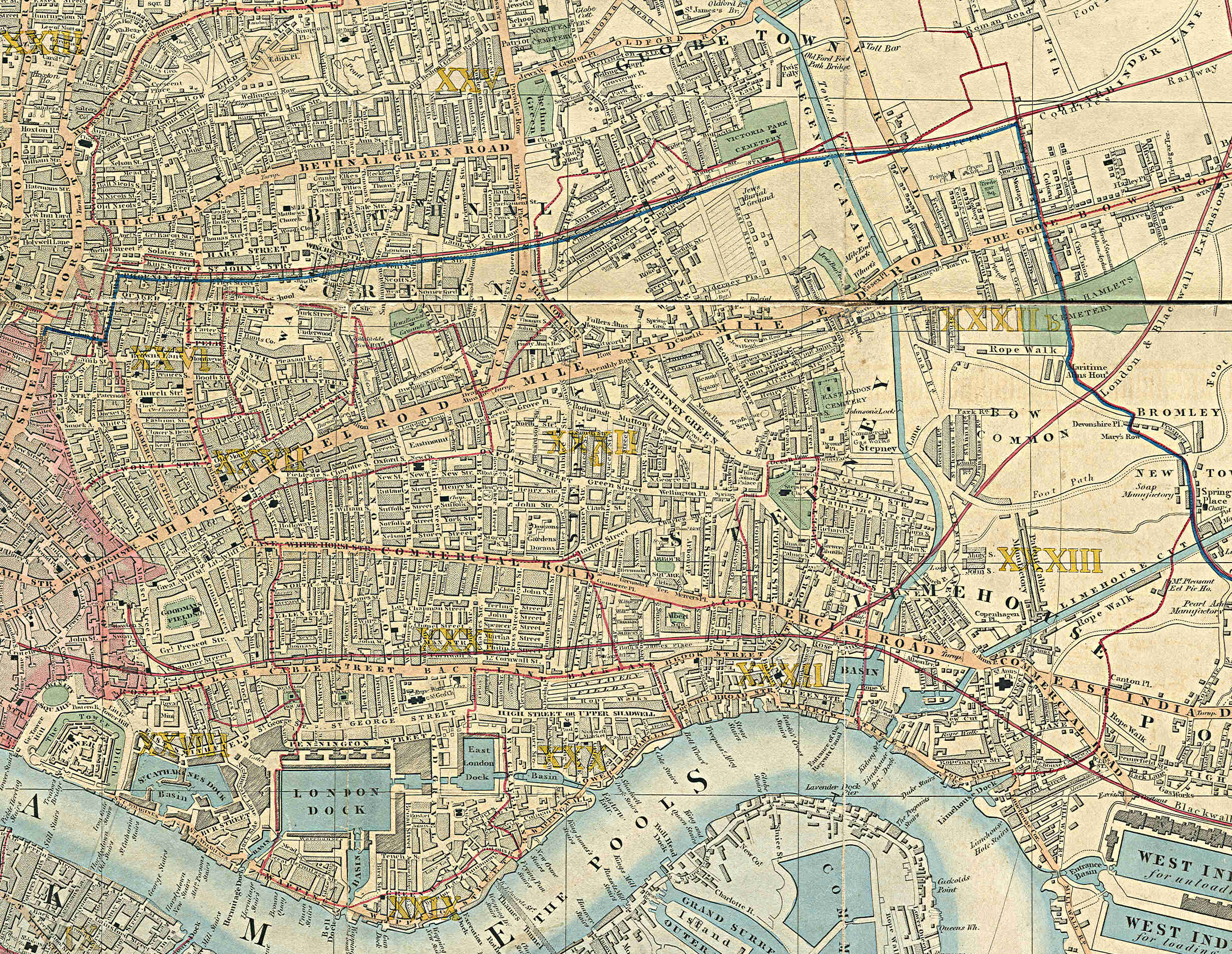
Map of 1853: The spread of London has reached Stepney

In 1883, Jacob P. Adler arrived in London with a troupe of refugee professional actors. He enlisted the help of local amateurs, and the Russian Jewish Operatic Company made their debut at the Beaumont Hall, close to Stepney Green tube station. Within two years they were able to establish their own theatre in Brick Lane.

Stepney Green railway station was opened in 1902 by the Whitechapel and Bow Railway, a joint venture between the District Railway and the London, Tilbury and Southend Railway. The station passed to London Underground in 1950.

In the early 20th century, Stepney was one of the most Jewish neighbourhoods in England; it was eventually superseded as such by Stamford Hill.

On 31 July 1987 the Docklands Light Railway, which operated over the old LBR line, commenced operations, with new platforms (platforms 3 and 4) built on the site of the old LBR platforms; at Stepney East which had been renamed Limehouse on 11 May that year.

== Governance ==
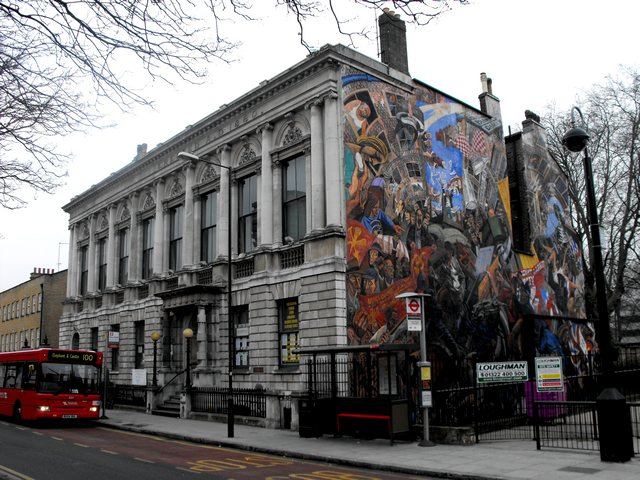
The former Stepney Town Hall, completed in 1860

Stepney is in the constituency of Bethnal Green and Stepney, represented in the House of Commons since 2010 by Rushanara Ali of the Labour Party.

At the lower tier of local government, Stepney is in the London Borough of Tower Hamlets, administered by Tower Hamlets London Borough Council and its directly elected executive mayor, the Mayor of Tower Hamlets. Stepney elects borough councillors from three wards, St Dunstan's, Bethnal Green and Stepney Green. At the upper tier, Stepney is in Greater London, administered by the Greater London Authority led by the Mayor of London.

== Geography ==
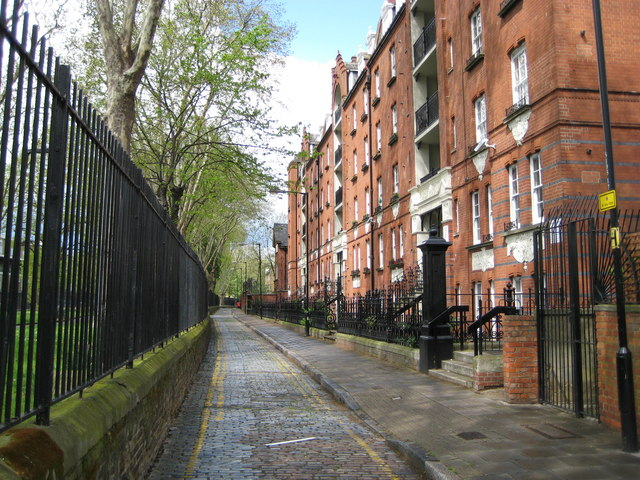
Stepney Green, Stepney Green Court

The Stepney Green Conservation Area was designated in January 1973, covering the area previously known as Mile End Old Town. It is a large Conservation Area with an irregular shape that encloses buildings around Mile End Road, Assembly Passage, Louisa Street and Stepney Green itself. It is an area of exceptional architectural and historic interest, with a character and appearance worthy of protection and enhancement. It is situated just north of the medieval village of Stepney, which was clustered around St. Dunstan's Church.

Stepney Green developed as a street of residential housing off the Mile End Road in the 15th century, and now refers to the area in north Stepney. A brewery was founded in 1738 that developed into Charrington and Co. in 1897. The brewery building, the Anchor Brewery, was on the north side of Mile End Road, opposite Stepney Green; and is now the site of the Anchor Retail Unit, owned by Henderson Global Investors, though the Brewery Offices still remain on the corner of Mile End Road and Cephas Avenue.

=== Nearest places ===
- Bethnal Green
- Limehouse
- Mile End
- Shadwell
- Whitechapel
- Bow

== Community ==
The Stepney Community Trust, a community-led charity with a long history of local action, was set up in 1982 as the St Mary's Centre to respond to the severe housing and social deprivation in the area. The name was later changed to Stepney Community Trust.

Stepney City Farm is a city farm which provides a number of community services, such as guided tours, workshops and other activities., was founded in 1979 by Lynne Bennett; at that time it was called Stepping Stones. Local residents, schools, churches and community groups were consulted and wasteland left after a World War II bomb destroyed the Stepney Congregational Church in 1941 was secured for the farm's use.

The Stepney Historical Trust was set up in 1989 to advance the public's education on the history of Stepney and the surrounding areas. It is based in the London Dockers Athletic and Social Club and has installed a series of plaques on sites of historic interest.

Jewish Care was created in 1990 by the merger of two previous charities to care for the community needs cost-effectively. It is based at the Brenner Centre in Raine House.

The City Gateway Women Programmes were established to provide opportunities for local women in Stepney to gain independence, grow in confidence and access employment and develop skills in a supportive community environment.

== Demographics ==
Due to the availability of cheap housing, the East End of London and London Borough of Stepney has been home to various immigrants who have contributed to the culture and history of the area, such as the French Huguenots in the 17th century, the Irish in the 18th century, Ashkenazi Jews fleeing pogroms in Eastern Europe towards the end of the 19th century, and the Bangladeshi community settling in the East End from the 1960s onwards. The area still contains a range of immigrants, particularly young Asian families, as well as elderly East Enders, some students, and the beginnings of a young middle class. The 2011 UK Census revealed that 47% of the population was Bengali; the highest percentage of Bengalis in Southern England. White British people comprise just over a quarter of the ward of St. Dunstan's and Stepney Green.

== Education ==
Stepney All Saints School is a Church of England voluntary aided school that was opened in 1710 by Sir John Cass as the Sir John Cass School. It merged with the Redcoat Secondary School in 1966 and took the name of Sir John Cass's Foundation and Red Coat School that year. It took its current name in 2020.

Stepney Green Maths, Computing and Science College is a community school for boys, the curriculum is broad, there is a wide range of extra-curricular activities offered before, during and after school.

== Sports ==
Stepney F.C. is a non-league association football team which currently plays in the Tower Hamlets-based Inner London Football League.

The district's Senrab Street gave its name to Senrab F.C., a youth team now based in Wanstead Flats and notable for producing many future professional players.

== Transport ==
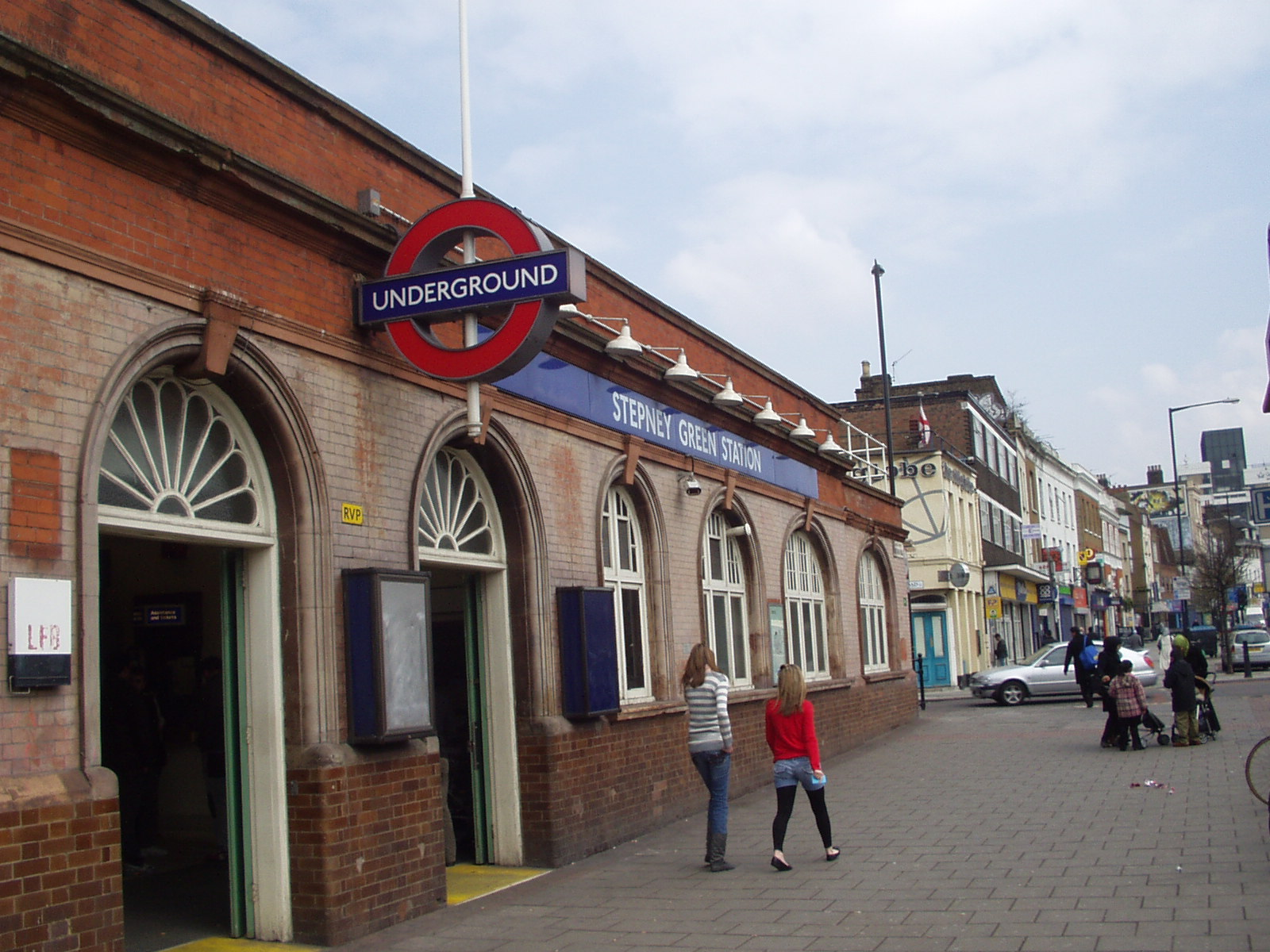
Stepney Green tube station.

Stepney is connected to the London Underground at Stepney Green tube station on the Hammersmith & City and District lines.

The area overall is covered by London Buses services, mostly west–east by the 25, 205, N25, N205 on Mile End Road and 15, 115, 135 and N550 on Commercial Road, the 309 and 339 via Ben Johnson Road.

An automatic air monitoring site in nearby Mile End recorded a 2017 annual average of 48 μg/m^{3}. Alternative monitoring sites on Mile End Road also failed to meet air quality objectives with a site at the junction with Globe Road recorded 52 μg/m^{3} as a 2017 average.

== Notable people ==
Richard Mead, a physician responsible for advances in the understanding of transmissible diseases, was born in Stepney.

Others born in Stepney are entertainer Des O'Connor, actor Steven Berkoff, playwright Arnold Wesker, gardener Rachel de Thame, television executive Alan Yentob, artist Frank Paton, drummer Kenney Jones, musician and writer Jah Wobble, singer Kenny Lynch and his sister Maxine Daniels, singer Charles Coborn, footballers Ledley King, Ashley Cole, Mark Lazarus, Barry Silkman, and Darren Purse, heavyweight boxer "Bombardier" Billy Wells, former armed robber and businessman Roy Shaw, former British featherweight boxing champion Sammy McCarthy, sportswriter Norman Giller, and Labour politician Wes Streeting.

Clergymen John Sentamu, formerly Bishop of Stepney, and Father Richard Wilson, founder of the Hoppers' Hospitals at Five Oak Green, Kent, lived in the borough at one time.

Actors born in Stepney include Matthew Garber, Bernard Bresslaw, Terence Stamp, Craig Fairbrass, Jeff Shankley, John Lyons, Eddie Marsan, Ben Onwukwe, Victor McLaglen, Roy Marsden, Ruth Sheen, Anita Dobson and Nicola Walker.

Musicians Monty Norman (composer of the James Bond Theme) and Lionel Bart (known for creating the book, music and lyrics to the production Oliver!), were also born in Stepney, as was musician Wiley, widely considered to be the founding father of grime music.

British communist Alf Salisbury, who smuggled monetary funds to German anti-fascists during Hitler's rise to power, and fought in both the Battle of Cable Street and for the International Brigades during the Spanish Civil War, was born in Stepney. Fellow communist and anti-war activist Betty Papworth was also born in Stepney.

== In popular culture ==
In her 2002 memoir Call the Midwife, Jennifer Worth gives an account of 1950s Stepney, describing poverty, condemned buildings, filth, and rampant prostitution.

In the 1965 Rolling Stones song Play with Fire, it is said an heiress whose wealth has been carried off by her husband "gets her kicks in Stepney, not in Knightsbridge anymore."

Elton John refers to Stepney in the song "Bitter Fingers" which was written by Elton and Bernie Taupin.

Folk noir duo Ruby Throat released a song called "Forget Me Nots of Stepney" on their 2012 album O' Doubt O' Stars.

Mentioned in Lock, Stock and Two Smoking Barrels "Hand made in Italy, hand stolen in Stepney"

== See also ==
- Joel Gascoyne
