= Alf Salisbury =

British Communist, Jewish anti-fascist, and trade union leader (1909–2000)

- Born: 1909; Stepney, England
- Died: 5 November 2000 (aged 91)
- Known for: Trade union and communist activism. Funding German anti-nazi resistance. Joining the International Brigades. Disability activism for people with Down's syndrome
- Political party: Communist Party of Great Britain (CPGB). Communist Party of Britain (CPB)
- Children: 2
- Relatives: 10 siblings
- Awards: Special commondations by the Ambassador of Mongolia

Alf Salisbury (1909 – 5 November 2000) was a British communist, Jewish activist, trade union leader, and anti-fascist. During the 1930s he smuggled monetary support from British communists to German communists to help resist the Nazis. Salisbury was present at many key events in the history of anti-fascism, including the Battle of Cable Street, and was also a member of the International Brigades during the Spanish Civil War (1936-1939). In his later life, Alf Salisbury led a successful campaign to convince the BBC and other British news outlets to stop using the term "Mongols" to refer to people with Down's syndrome. For this work he was awarded with special commondations from the Mongolian embassy and a stay in a Mongolian health spa. He was a member of the Communist Party of Great Britain (CPGB), before becoming a founding member of its continuation, the Communist Party of Britain (CPB).

== Early and family life ==
Alf Salisbury was born on 6 December 1909 in Stepney, England. His family were Latvian Jewish refugees from Riga, who had fled to Britain to escape Czarist pogroms. In 1902 the Salisbury family arrived in Britain, making a home for themselves in London's east end, which was home to communities of Russian and Baltic Jewish communities. Alf Salisbury and his family grew up in poverty, inspiring his future hatred of capitalism.

At the age of 14, Alf Salisbury left school and soon afterwards joined the National Union of Seamen, then led by Havelock Wilson. Alf Salisbury jumped ship in New York and spent three years working and travelling across the world, but mostly in America. During this time he came became a supporter of Industrial Workers of the World (IWW).

In 1929 Alf Salisbury briefly returned to Britain, was then arrested in Guatemala after being accused of spying, and also joined the Communist Party of Great Britain (CPGB). After joining the CPGB he would remain within the British communist movement until his death.

== Clandestine support for anti-Nazi German ==
In 1933 Alf Salisbury became one of a small number of CPGB activists working for Harry Pollitt that were tasked with being a clandestine courier supporting anti-nazi resistance belonging to the Communist Party of Germany (KPD). This role was extremely dangerous and often put Salisbury at risk of being killed by the Nazis. Salisbury would regularly receive postcards, which would trigger a rendezvous with Harry Pollitt at a pub close to the CPGB headquarters on King Street in London, where Pollitt would give Salisbury large amounts of German currency. Salisbury would then take the money to German docks where he would make secret meetings with KDP members, many of whom were themselves on the run. During one of these meetings at a German dock, Salisbury's fellow British sailors became involved in a violent fight against Nazi brownshirts, leading to Salisbury's arrest. With intervention from the British embassy, Salisbury was freed and returned to Britain. By the mid-1930s, Alf Salisbury was blacklisted from the merchant navy in 1936 and found himself unemployed. He then joined the National Unemployed Workers' Movement (NUWM) and became active as a community organiser.

== Joining the International Brigades ==
Alf Salisbury became active in anti-fascist activism, and was also a participant in the Battle of Cable Street. In 1937 he left Britain to join the International Brigades and fight in the Spanish Civil War. He was guided through France and into Spain by French communists, crossing the Pyrenees at night. Friends of Salisbury would mention that he often vividly recalled his experiences during the war and the deaths of many people close to him, including one woman who he remarked that he could have married. He fought for 16 months in the Spanish Civil War before returning to Britain in 1038.

== Trade Union activism ==
Once Alf Salisbury returned to Britain, he became the secretary of the Stepney branch of the NUWM. During protests with the NUWM, Salisbury chained himself to the Settles Street Labour Exchange, ordered tea at the Ritz hotel and refused to pay, and laid down in the road in Oxford Circus to block traffic. At a New Year's Eve celebration with the NUWM, Alf Salisbury was one of many activists who marched to Downing Street carrying a coffin. During the protest he was brutally attacked by the police and bound over at Bow magistrates court the next day. Both communist and NUWM activists were angered by Salisbury's treatment by the police, and organised a march demanding his freedom. Come the end of the Phoney War, Alf Salisbury was called up for military service, however he was told that he had failed the medical test, which was a common method of excluding communists from the British military. Friends of Salisbury believed he was rejected due to his former membership of the International Brigades. Instead of joining the military, in 1940 he married Lilly Nicklansky, travelled to Carlisle and became a CPGB communist party organiser in Maryport, and also a shop steward in a munitions factory, before moving to Leicester.

After World War II Alf Salisbury became a well-known figure within the National Union of Tailors and Garment Workers, but was repeatedly sacked from employment. During the 1949 Savoy workers strike, Alf made the news after throwing himself in front of a truck that sought to break the picket, narrowly avoiding serious injury. One of the women at the picket died of a heart attack, which was a major source of guilt for Salisbury as he had been the picket captain at the time. During the 1950s Alf Salisbury reinvented himself as a railway worker, first being employed at South Tottenham station and then King's Cross stations. In 1962 he left rail work and began working in a furniture factory, and then a chemical factory, becoming a shop steward in both. During the mid-1960s he began working for the London Co-op, and became well known at meetings of the Union of Shop, Distributive and Allied Workers (USDAW) where he would sell the Morning Star. Alf Salisbury further branched out into other organisations, becoming an active member of the Campaign for Nuclear Disarmament (CND), the Greater London Pensioners & Trade Union Action Group, and became a delegate to the Cities of London and Westminster Trades Councils.

== Later life ==
Alf Salisbury lived in the same constituency as MP Norman Tebbit, and the two often attacked each other in newspapers and at meetings.

It is unknown how many times Alf Salisbury had been arrested during his life, but his biographer Liane Groves believes that Salisbury was arrested over 30 times.

At some moment during the 1980s, Alf Salisbury was expelled from the Communist Party of Great Britain (CPGB), an organisation he had been a member and supporter of since 1929. He and many other of the expelled members created the Communist Party of Britain (CPB), which is today the continuation of the original CPGB after the latter's dissolvement in 1991.

== Activism for people with Down's Syndrome ==
Nearing the final years of his life, Alf Salisbury began picketing the British Broadcasting Company (BBC) and the Independent Television News (ITN), arguing that their use of the term "Mongols" to describe people with Down's syndrome was racist. For almost an entire year, Salisbury picketed the offices of both the BBC every morning, and ITN every evening. His homemade signs and his practice of stopping people on the streets to talk about the issue, gained the attention of the BBC and ITN who then reviewed the use of the term in the context of children with Down's syndrome. Salisbury also lobbied the Press Council, which found in his favour. His campaign was successful and both the BBC and ITN dropped the term "Mongols" when referring to people with Down's syndrome. Despite this success, Salisbury did not stop his campaign and began to hold similar pickets of the offices of major British newspapers including the Daily Mail, until they also dropped the use of the term.

Alf Salisbury's successful campaign was noticed by the staff of the embassy of Mongolia, who rewarded Salisbury with special commendations by a Mongolian ambassador, and awarded Salisbury with a stay at a health spa in Mongolia as a sign of respect and gratitude.

== Death ==
Alf Salisbury died on the 5th November 2000, at the age of 91. His funeral was held in November 2000.

== See also ==
- Bill Alexander
- Charlie Hutchison
- Ralph Winston Fox
- British Battalion
- Jessie Eden
