= St George in the East (parish) =

Ancient parish in the London Borough of Tower Hamlets, England

Coordinates: 51.5090°N 0.0587°W

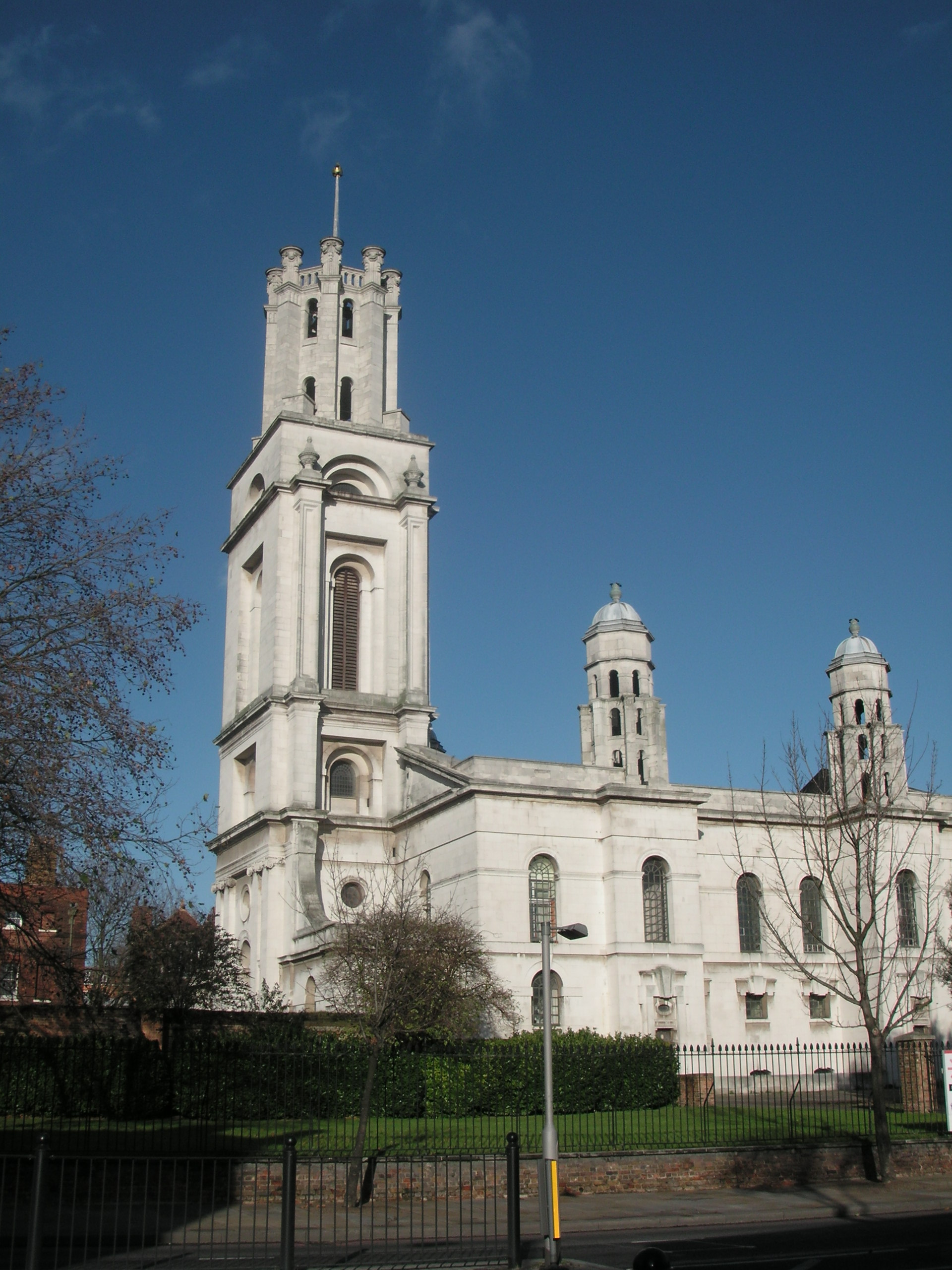

- Location within Greater London
- London borough: Tower Hamlets
- Ceremonial county: Greater London
- Region: London
- Country: England
- Sovereign state: United Kingdom
- Police: Metropolitan
- Fire: London
- Ambulance: London
- London Assembly: City and East

St George in the East, historically known as Wapping-Stepney is an area in the London Borough of Tower Hamlets, England. It was an ancient parish, it was the larger of the two parishes that made up Wapping.

Ancient parish areas were historically the same for both civil and ecclesiastical (church) functions, and as St George in the East is no longer a unit of civil administration and no longer has a railway station named for it, the place name is not as commonly used as it once was. There is still a smaller continuing ecclesiastical parish.

== History ==
Much of the parish was rural at the time of its creation, as a daughter parish of St Dunstan's, Stepney, in 1729. Prior to that it had been a 'Hamlet' (administrative sub-division of Stepney) known as Wapping-Stepney (meaning the part of Wapping within Stepney) to distinguish it from Wapping-Whitechapel (the part of Wapping within Whitechapel) which later became the parish of St John of Wapping.

The parish church of St George in the East was completed in 1729 by the Commission for Building Fifty New Churches. To distinguish it from other parishes in and near London with the same name, an addition was made which denoted it as "in the East" as a suffix which reflected it was then an eastern suburb of London.

The parish boundaries of St George in the East were used as the basis of two wards of the Metropolitan Borough of Stepney.

Being close to the Thames, the district has long had a mixed community. The area was home to a number of migrants in the 15th century, notably many seamen from Low Countries. There was a sizeable Irish and German presence from the 16th century onward. Huguenot refugees were present in significant numbers from at least the early 18th century By the late 18th century there were many black people, and the area would subsequently become home for many Jews, Bangladeshis and others.

In 1800, work on constructing the London Docks had begun, with parts of Wapping demolished. In 1820 St. George in the East was at the height of its prosperity with wealthy merchants and traders living and building in the parish. The London Docks caused a large influx of unskilled labour and brought poverty with the population growing dense and causing outbreaks of cholera in 1849, 1855, and in 1866.

In the 1930s, Sir Oswald Mosley's British Union of Fascists gathered 3,000 Blackshirts for a march through the East End of London, an area with a large Jewish population. Between 100,000 and 300,000 people came onto the streets to block the way. Police tried in several places to clear a route for the marchers, one of which was through Cable Street. Police progress was blocked by protesters' barricades at the junction of Cable Street and Christian Street, with the days events becoming known after as the Battle of Cable Street. A mural painted on St George's Town Hall commemorates this event.

After the devastating bomb damage during the Second World War, St George in the East was redeveloped into an almost entirely residential area, which included high-rise flats in tower block style built in the 1970s.

== Geography ==
Much of the former northern boundary of the parish was with Mile End Old Town and ran alongside Commercial Road. In the west the boundary with Whitechapel fell just short of Back Church Lane. The parish of Wapping bordered it to the south, with Wapping forming a salient in the west, dividing it from St Botolph Without Aldgate. The parish of Shadwell was to the east, and the parishes of Wapping and Shadwell almost met, giving St George in the East only a narrow frontage to the River Thames of 53 feet (16 m).

The Highway was formerly called St George's Street as it passed through the area, taking the name High Street Shadwell as it headed west into Shadwell. Most of the London Docks, which have since been largely filled in, lay within the parish. There is an architectural Conservation Area covering the area around the Parish church and Town Hall.

== Governance ==
St George in the East St George Middlesex
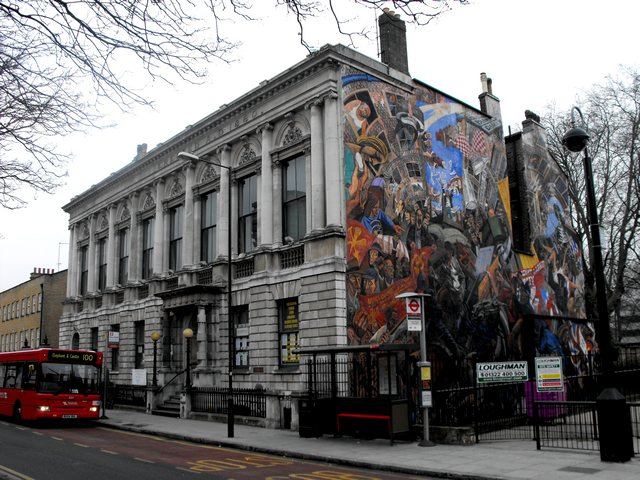
- St George's Town Hall, Cable Street.

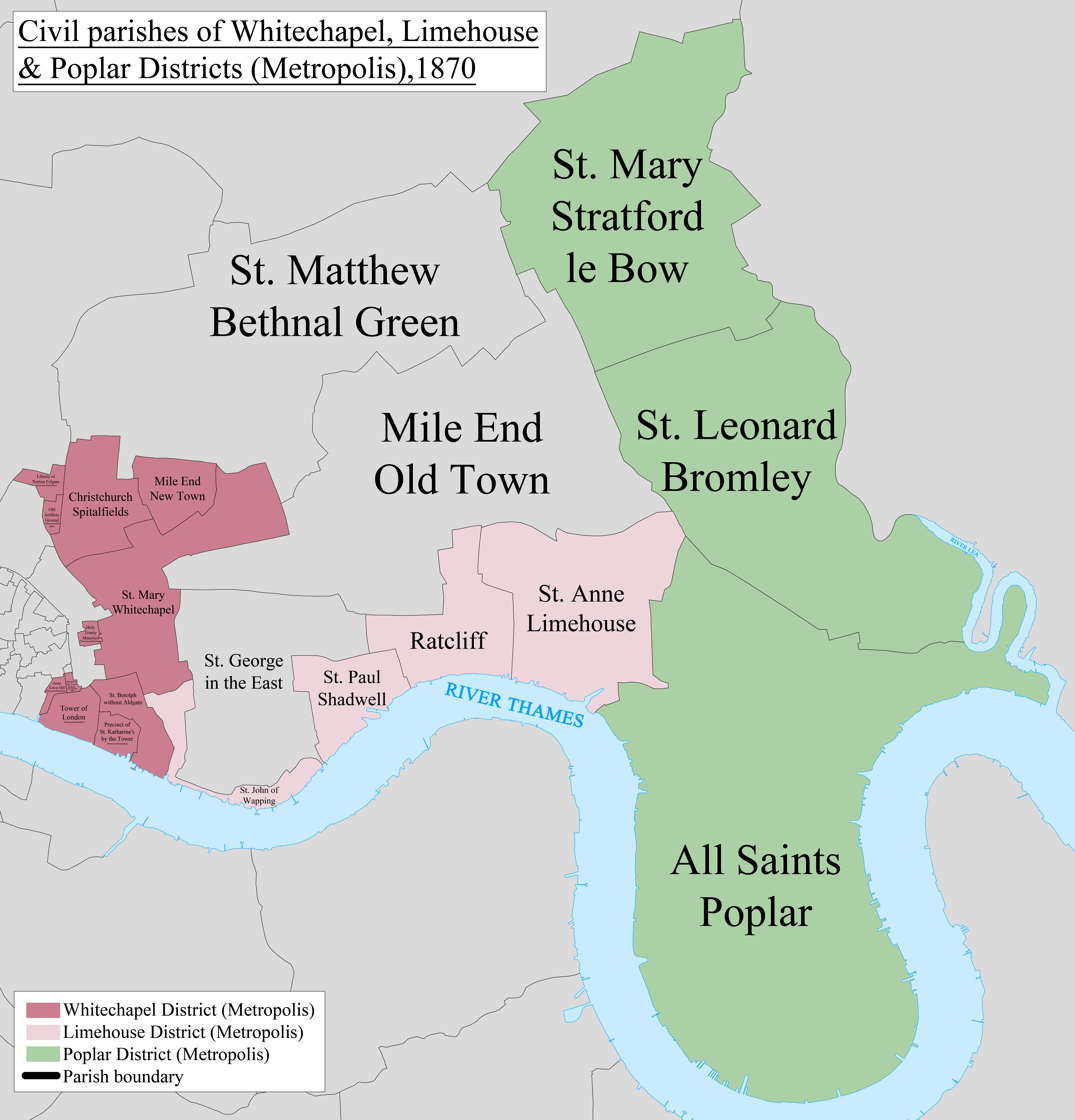
- Area
  - 1881: 243 acres (0.98 km^{2})
- Population
  - 1881: 47,157
- Density
  - 1881: 194/acre
- History
  - Origin: Split from Stepney parish
  - Created: 1729
  - Abolished: 1927
  - Succeeded by: Stepney Borough parish
- Status: Civil parish
- Government: Vestry of the Parish of St George (1855—1900)
  - HQ: St George's Town Hall, Cable Street

Wapping Stepney Act 1728
- Act of Parliament
- Parliament of Great Britain
- Long title: An Act for making the Hamlet of Wapping Stepney, in the Parish of St. Dunstan Stebunheath, alias Stepney, in the County of Middlesex, a distinct Parish; and for providing a Maintenance for the Minister of the new Church there.
- Citation: 2 Geo. 2. c. 30
- Territorial extent: Great Britain

Dates
- Royal assent: 14 May 1729
- Commencement: 21 January 1729 (Note: Start of session.)
- Repealed
Other legislation
Repealed by	London Government (Borough of Stepney) Order in Council 1901
Relates to	Spittlefields, Stepney (Parish) Act 1727; Metropolis Management Act 1855

Status: Repealed

Text of statute as originally enacted

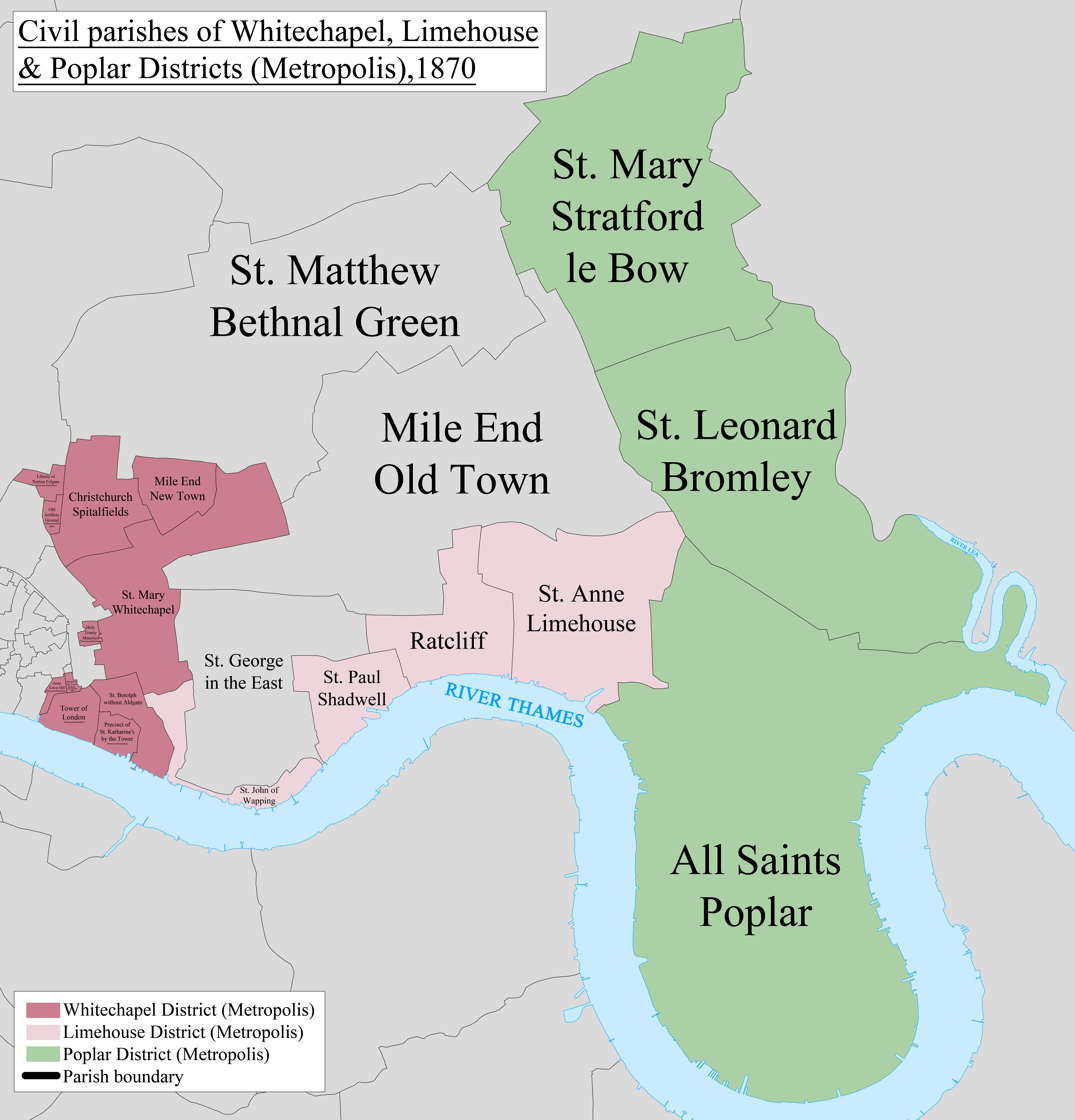
The daughter-parishes of Stepney that would evolve into the modern London Borough of Tower Hamlets

St George in the East, in early decades especially also referred to as St George Middlesex; had for centuries been part of Stepney in the Tower division of the Ossulstone hundred of Middlesex. It was split off as a separate combined secular and ecclesiastical parish 1729 by the Wapping Stepney Act 1728 (2 Geo. 2. c. 30), and had a population of 47,157 by 1881. Aside from co-government with London County Council from its 1889 inception, local government was through the Vestry of the Parish of St George from 1855 to 1900. Following the Poor Law Amendment Act 1834, it was constituted a Poor Law unit for rate collection and administration (including distributions) from 1836.

The parish vestry became a local authority in the Metropolis in 1855, nominating one member to the co-governing Metropolitan Board of Works.

Under the Metropolis Management Act 1855 (18 & 19 Vict. c. 120) any parish that exceeded 2,000 ratepayers was to be divided into wards; as such the incorporated vestry of St George in the East was divided into two wards (electing vestrymen): No. 1 or North (18) and No. 2 or South (18).

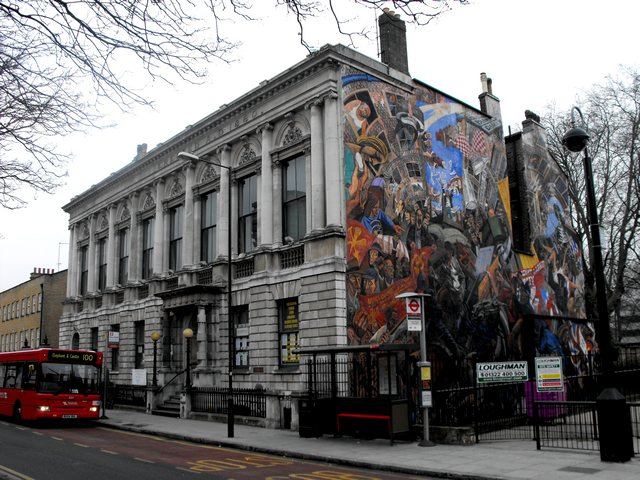
St George's Vestry Hall

The board of works was replaced by the directly elected London County Council in 1889 and its area of responsibly became the County of London. St George in the East became part of the Metropolitan Borough of Stepney in 1900. On 1 April 1927 the civil parish was abolished and merged with Stepney. At the 1921 census (the last before the abolition of the parish), St George in the East had a population of 40,441. The vestry hall was on Cable Street and today has non-governmental use.

Under the new model of government, Tower Hamlets Borough Council was assigned its functions in 1965.

Although the area is no longer a civil parish, there remains a smaller ecclesiastical (church) parish.

Relevant Members of Parliament

It was part of the Middlesex two-member (MP) constituency and then that of soon similarly under-represented Tower Hamlets from 1832 to 1885. A St George seat spanned 1885 to 1918, under the Redistribution of Seats Act 1885 during which time overcrowding fell. Larger Whitechapel and St Georges, covered the next years to 1950. It was locally replaced with seat Stepney, amended in 1950 to become Stepney and Poplar, amended in 1983 to become locally Bethnal Green and Stepney then falling almost all in Poplar and Limehouse.

== Namesakes ==
- St George in the East, the parish church.
- St George's Town Hall, former centre of local government.
- St George's Estate, on the south side of Cable Street.
- St George's Street, the former name of the part of what is now known as The Highway, as it passed through the parish.
- St George in the East Hospital, Wapping Lane. Badly damaged in the Blitz and closed in 1956.
- St George's Leisure Centre, proposed community facility.

== Railway stations ==
- Shadwell and St George's East railway station on the London and Blackwall line was within the parish of St George.

== Notable residents ==
- John Balleny, mariner and explorer.
- Lottie Collins, musical hall singer
- Ted "Kid" Lewis, former World Welterweight boxing champion
