= Ratcliff =

District of East London, England

Coordinates: 51.512054°N 0.038946°W

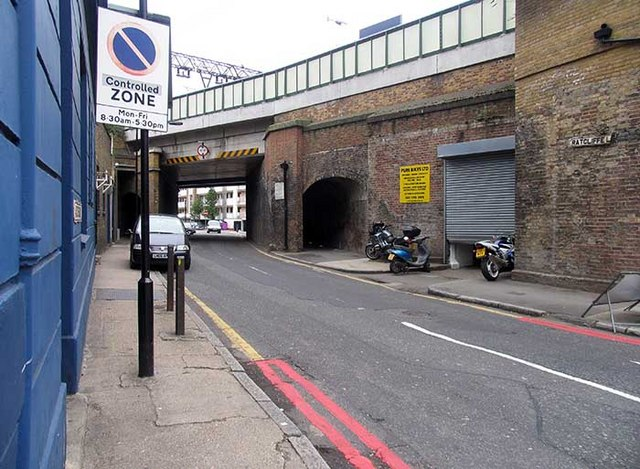
- Ratcliffe Lane, near Limehouse station.

- Location within Greater London
- London borough: Tower Hamlets
- Ceremonial county: Greater London
- Region: London
- Country: England
- Sovereign state: United Kingdom
- Post town: LONDON
- Postcode district: E1, E1W, E14
- Dialling code: 020
- Police: Metropolitan
- Fire: London
- Ambulance: London
- London Assembly: City and East

Ratcliff or Ratcliffe is a locality in the London Borough of Tower Hamlets. It lies on the north bank of the River Thames between Limehouse (to the east), and Shadwell (to the west).

== History ==
=== Etymology and origin ===
The name Ratcliff is first known from a record of 1294 as Rede clive; other early variants include Radeclyve (1305) and la Redeclyve juxta Stubenheth [Stepney] (1307). It has been interpreted as red slope or cliff. "The name must have been given to the slight rise up from the Thames bank to the level ground up above. The reason for the epithet red is not clear". According to the Oxford English Dictionary the Old English word rede, apart from the colour red, can mean "reed" and "an anchorage for ships", while rade can mean "a path or way between different places". The name Redriff or Redriffe (Rotherhithe) was applied to the opposite shore of the Thames until the late 18th century.

Ratcliff was historically part of the Manor and Ancient Parish of Stepney. The place name Stepney evolved from Stybbanhyð, first recorded around AD 1000. Stybbanhyð probably translates into modern English as "Stybba's hithe (landing place)", with Stybba the individual who owned the Manor (estate). The hithe itself is thought to have been at Ratcliff, just under one-half mile (800 metres) south of St Dunstan's Church.

As there is no current Ratcliff administrative unit, and there is no current railway station bearing the name, the place name is not as commonly used as it once was.

=== Civil and ecclesiastical administration ===
The hamlet was divided between the parishes of Limehouse and Stepney until 1866, when it was constituted a separate civil parish (as Ratcliffe). From 1855 it was administered by Limehouse District Board of Works, and in 1900 became part of the Metropolitan Borough of Stepney. On 1 April 1921 the parish was abolished and merged with Limehouse. At the 1911 census (one of the last before the abolition of the parish), Ratcliffe had a population of 13,114. By the latter half of the nineteenth century, the condition of the area had improved somewhat - the 1868 'National Gazetteer of Great Britain and Ireland' describes Ratcliffe as inhabited by persons connected with shipping and having extensive warehouses, with the area 'well paved, lighted with gas, and supplied with water from the reservoir at Old Ford'.

The parish church of Ratcliffe, St. James in Butcher Row, was built in 1838 and served the area until 1951 (it was damaged during the Second World War), when the parish was merged with St. Paul, Shadwell. In 1948 the church site became (and remains) the East London home of the Royal Foundation of St. Katharine. The social campaigner Father John Groser became the first Master of the Foundation in its new home.

The area was part of the historic (or ancient) county of Middlesex, but military and most (or all) civil county functions were managed more locally, by the Tower Division (also known as the Tower Hamlets).

The role of the Tower Division ended when Ratcliff became part of the new County of London in 1889. The County of London was replaced by Greater London in 1965.

=== History ===
"Ratcliff Cross", dance tune known before 1726

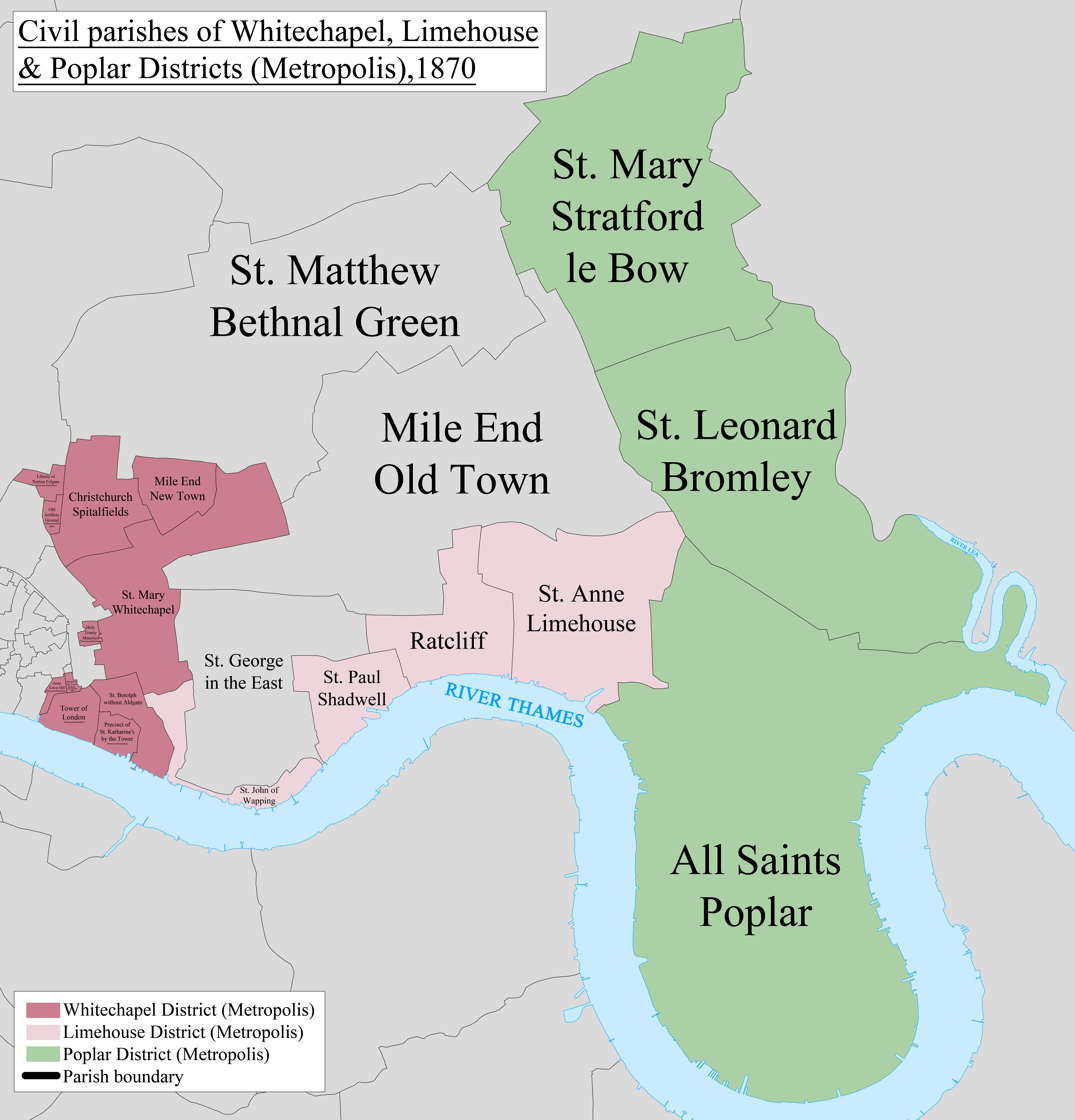
The daughter-parishes of Stepney that would evolve into the modern London Borough of Tower Hamlets

Ratcliff's boundaries preserved as an electoral ward in the Metropolitan Borough of Stepney

Ratcliffe in earlier times was also known as "sailor town". It was originally known for shipbuilding but from the fourteenth century more for fitting and provisioning ships. In the sixteenth century, various voyages of discovery were supplied and departed from Ratcliffe, including those of Willoughby and Frobisher. By the early seventeenth century, it had the largest population of any Hamlet (administrative sub-division) in Stepney, with 3500 residents.

It was again a site of shipbuilding in the seventeenth century: a number of sailing warships were built for the Royal Navy here, including one of the earliest frigates, the Constant Warwick in 1645. Located at the western end of Narrow Street, it was made up of lodging houses, bars, brothels, music halls and opium dens. This overcrowded and squalid district acquired an unsavoury reputation with a large transient population. In 1794 approximately half of the hamlet was destroyed in a fire but, even so, it continued as a notorious slum well into the nineteenth century.

From the late sixteenth century, Ratcliffe and surrounding areas were notable areas for non-conformist Christianity. John Penry preached in the area in 1592/3, until he was spotted by the local vicar at Ratcliffe and subsequently hanged. By 1669, around 200 Presbyterians were worshipping at a warehouse at Ratcliffe Cross and there was a purpose-built Quaker meeting house in Schoolhouse Lane, which was demolished by soldiers in 1670.

In late 1811, seven murders took place in Ratcliffe Highway (more recently St. George's Street), allegedly committed by a sailor named Williams, who committed suicide after being captured. The murders were later fictionalised in an account by Thomas De Quincey.

=== The Ratcliffe Fire ===
The Ratcliffe Fire was the largest fire disaster in London between the Great Fire of 1666 and the Blitz in 1940. The fire took place in July 1794 when a smaller fire ignited a barge loaded with saltpetre. The conflagration that followed destroyed over 400 homes and 20 warehouses and left 1000 people homeless. Following the fire tents were set up near to St. Dunstan's Church whilst the area was rebuilt.

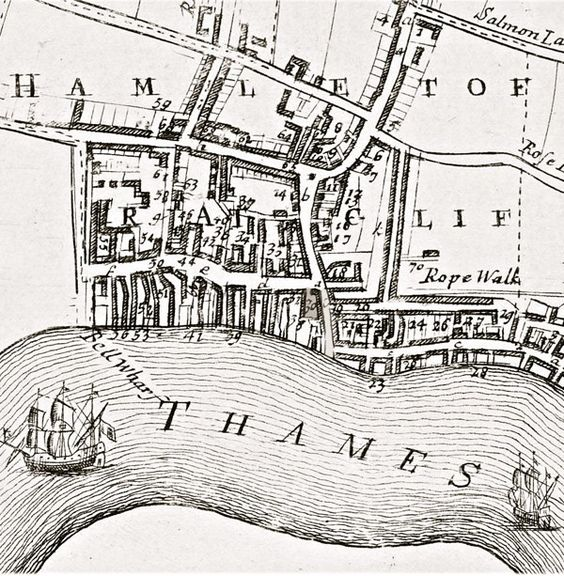
The Hamlet (administrative sub-division) of Ratcliff in Joel Gascoyne's 1703 map of the Parish of Stepney

== Population and area ==
The hamlet of Ratcliffe covered 111 acres (0.4 km^{2}) and had a Census population of:

Hamlet of Ratcliffe 1801-1901

Year	1801	1811	1821	1831	1841	1851	1861	1871	1881	1891	1901
Population	5,666	6,998	6,973	9,741	11,874	15,212	16,874	16,131	16,107	14,928	14,810

== See also ==
- Ratcliff Highway murders
- St Dunstan's, Stepney
- The Highway (London)
- Cable Street
- Stepney Historical Trust

== External links and information ==
- Ratcliffe https://web.archive.org/web/20051226015402/http://www.eolfhs.org.uk/parish/ratcliff.htm
- Ratcliffe https://web.archive.org/web/20060213214435/http://www.eastlondonhistory.com/ratcliff.htm
- The Ratcliffe waterfront http://www.portcities.org.uk/london/upload/img_200/PX9445.jpg
- The Museum in Docklands has an area set up to look like 'Sailortown' and information about the Ratcliffe Fire
- 1903 description of the Parish of St James, Ratcliff by Walter Besant
