= St George's Town Hall =

Municipal building in London, England

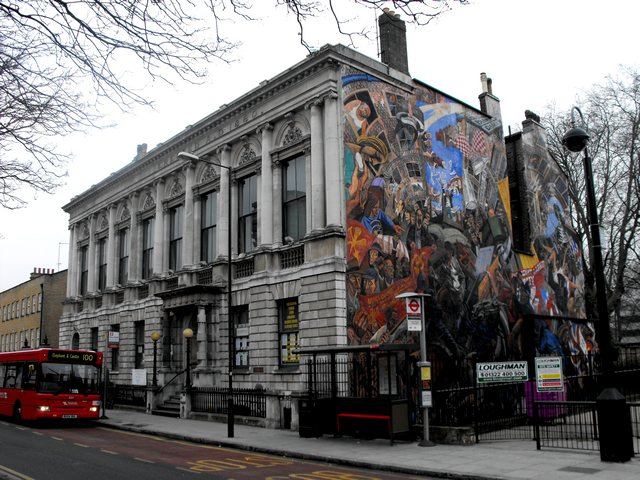
- St George's Town Hall

- Shown in Tower Hamlets
- 51.5109°N 0.0584°W
- Location: 236 Cable Street, E1 0BL

History
- Built: 1860; 166 years ago

Site notes
- Architect: Andrew Wilson
- Architectural style: Classical style

Listed Building – Grade II
- Official name: St Georges Town Hall
- Designated: 11 April 1990
- Reference no.: 1242346

St George's Town Hall is a municipal building on Cable Street in the London Borough of Tower Hamlets. It was originally known as St George's Vestry Hall and built to house the local government of the St George in the East area of Wapping.

The St George in the East district merged into the new larger Metropolitan Borough of Stepney, with the building subsequently becoming known as Stepney Town Hall. It would later be renamed St George's Town Hall.

It is a Grade II listed building.

== History ==
In the mid-19th century the local vestry board met in a room on the south-west corner of the Church of St George in the East. Board members decided this arrangement was inadequate for their needs and that they would procure a purpose-built vestry hall for the Parish of St George: the site chosen was to the north-east of the church and already formed part of the church grounds.

The vestry hall, the western section of the current complex, was designed by Andrew Wilson in the Classical style and was completed in 1860. The design involved a symmetrical main frontage with five bays facing onto Cable Street; there was a porch with Doric order columns and pilasters and a triglyphed frieze projecting from the central section and a row of windows interspersed with Ionic order columns on the first floor. A cornice bearing the words "Erected AD 1860" was added at roof level. The principal room was the board room (subsequently termed the council chamber) located on the first floor at the front of the building.

On 1 October 1888 the inquest into the death of Elizabeth Stride, the third victim of the Whitechapel murders, was held in the building.

The building was extended eastwards by adding an extra three bays to the five bays that already existed in a similar style in 1899; it went on to become the headquarters of the Metropolitan Borough of Stepney as "Stepney Town Hall" in 1900. The area a short distance west of town hall was the scene of the Battle of Cable Street on Sunday 4 October 1936 when a clash took place between the Metropolitan Police, sent to protect a march by members of the British Union of Fascists, led by Oswald Mosley, and various anti-fascist demonstrators. A mural, which was painted on the side of the building, in the early 1980s, to depict these events, was restored in the early 21st century.

The building ceased to function as the local seat of government when the enlarged London Borough of Tower Hamlets was formed in 1965. It subsequently became the home of various community organisations including St George's Boxing Club. After the building was converted for commercial use in the 1990s, a community centre, managed by Unite the Union, was established in the basement in 2013.
