= Stepney (parish) =

Coordinates: 51°30.8′N 0°3′W

Stepney St Dunstan
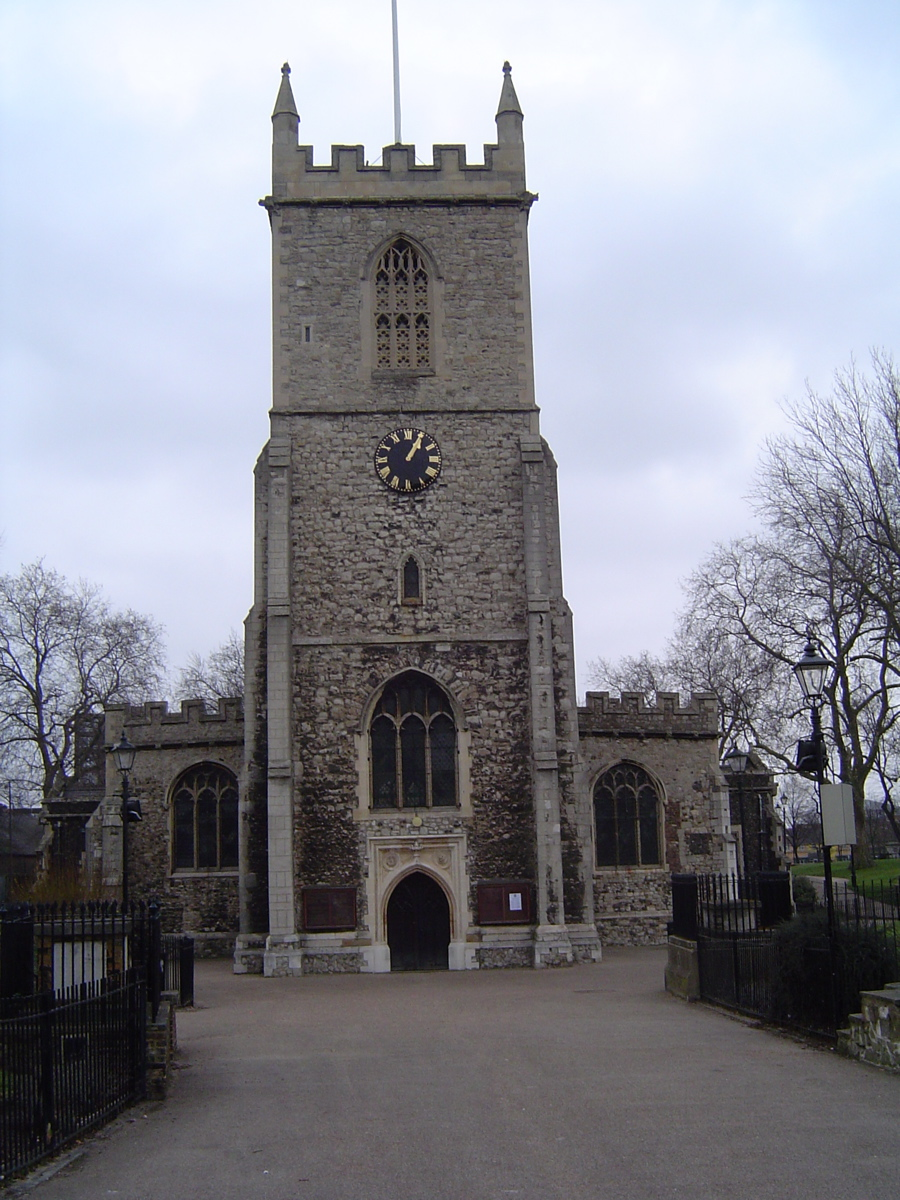

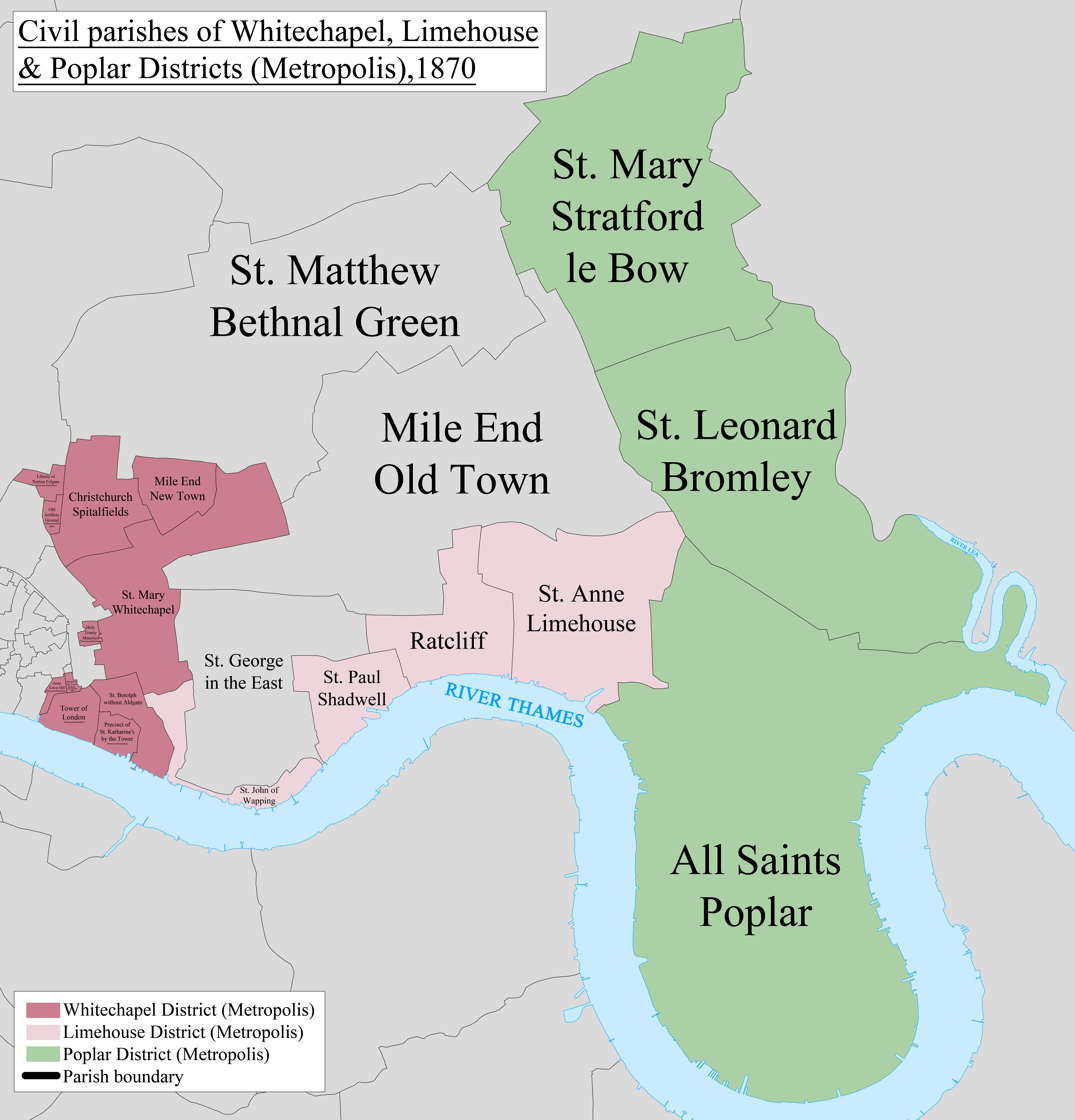
- Area
  - 1851: 812 acres (3.29 km^{2})
  - 1861: 812 acres (3.29 km^{2})
- Population
  - 1851: 80,218
  - 1861: 98,836
- History
  - Origin: Ancient parish
  - Created: 10th century
  - Abolished: 1866
  - Succeeded by: Various (see text)
- Status: Civil parish

Stepney was an ancient civil and ecclesiastical parish in the historic county of Middlesex to the east and north east of the City of London, England.

== Origins ==
The parish had Anglo-Saxon origins as the vill of Stepney, a larger area including Hackney and Bromley-by-Bow. The vill was under the direct jurisdiction of the Bishops of London, and was centred on a church that eventually was dedicated to St Dunstan. The parish was included in the returns of the bills of mortality from 1636.

It was a large parish and contained a number of distinct communities, comprising much of what became the East End of London. The area witnessed a very large increase in population from the beginning of the 17th century due both to the development of the docks and the suburban expansion of London. This led to the various parts of Stepney gradually being constituted as separate parishes. The final division of the parish of Stepney took place in 1866.

== Governance ==
The parish had an open vestry until 1589. It was replaced with a select vestry of 32 members, eight from each of Ratcliffe, Limehouse, Poplar, and Mile End with Bethnal Green. Elections took place every five years, with the number of members increased to 40.

== Component areas and division of parish ==
Stepney had a number of well-defined subdivisions which were eventually constituted parishes in their own right. The vestries of these parishes were entrusted with a number of purely local government or "civil" functions such as highway maintenance and relief of the poor. Until 1837, when a number of new ecclesiastical parishes were formed, the boundaries of the civil and Church of England parishes were identical. By 1890 the ancient parish was divided between 67 Anglican parishes (a number later greatly reduced) which had little relation to the civil boundaries and are not listed here.

Daughter parish	Date of creation	Notes
Whitechapel	By 1329	St Mary Matfelon, known as the "white chapel", built as a chapel of ease in the 13th century, on the road to Colchester (now Whitechapel High Street and Whitechapel Road). The area had become a distinct parish by 1329. Later included reclaimed land between the medieval river wall and the low water mark and known as "Wapping-Whitechapel" to distinguish it from "Wapping-Stepney". This later became the parish of Wapping in 1694.
Shadwell	1670	Chapel of ease built for the precinct of Shadwell by the Honourable East India Company in 1656, became parish church of St Paul Shadwell in 1670.
Wapping (formed from Whitechapel)	1694	The area of reclaimed land known as "Wapping-Whitechapel" (see Whitechapel above); Chapel of ease built by Honourable East India Company in 1614, became parish church of St John Wapping in 1694.
Stratford-le-Bow	1719	Chapel of ease of St Mary built in the 14th century. Made a parish in 1719. Included the Old Ford area
Limehouse	1729	St Anne's Limehouse was one of the new Commission for Building Fifty New Churches, begun in 1723. Became a parish church in 1729.
St George in the East	1729	The area formerly known as Wapping-Stepney. The church was begun in 1715 by the Commission for Building Fifty New Churches. Became a parish in 1729.
Spitalfields	1729	Christ Church, Spitalfields was one of the new Commission for Building Fifty New Churches, begun in 1723. Became a parish church in 1729.
Bethnal Green	1743	Hamlet of Bethnal Green formed into a separate parish (St Matthew) by act of parliament
Poplar	1817	Chapel of ease for the hamlet of Poplar (now St Matthias Old Church) was built by Honourable East India Company in 1654. Following the creation of the parish, a new parish church of All Saints Poplar was built in 1821–23. The parish included the entire Isle of Dogs.
Mile End New Town	1866	Hamlet adjacent to Spitalfields and Whitechapel. Was detached from the remainder of the parish of Stepney in 1743 by the separation of Bethnal Green.
Mile End Old Town	1866	The Mile End area formed the centre of the parish of Stepney, and included St Dunstan's Church.
Ratcliff	1866	Hamlet of Ratcliff (or Ratcliffe) formed the remaining riverside portion of Stepney

== Legacy ==
In 1895, the title Bishop of Stepney was given to a new suffragan in the Diocese of London responsible for an area of East London approximating to the ancient parish. The name was revived for local government in 1900 when the Metropolitan Borough of Stepney was formed covering part of the ancient parish. The area of the parish now makes up the majority of the London Borough of Tower Hamlets.
