= Metropolitan Borough of Stepney =

Metropolitan borough in the County of London

Coordinates: 51.5190°N 0.0427°W

Stepney
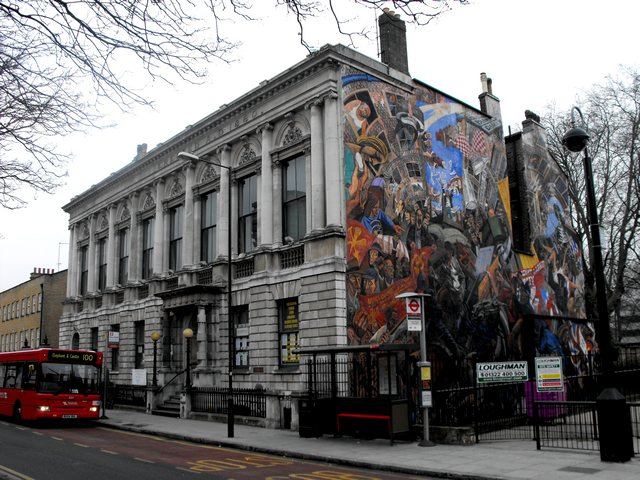
- The former Stepney Town Hall in Cable Street

- Stepney within the County of London
- Area
  - 1911/1931: 1,766 acres (7.15 km^{2})
  - 1961: 1,771 acres (7.17 km^{2})
- Population
  - 1911: 279,804
  - 1931: 225,238
  - 1961: 92,000
- Density
  - 1911: 158/acre
  - 1931: 127/acre
  - 1961: 52/acre
- History
  - Created: 1900
  - Abolished: 1965
  - Succeeded by: London Borough of Tower Hamlets
- Status: Metropolitan borough (1900—1965); Civil parish (1927—1965)
- Government: Stepney Borough Council
  - HQ: Cheviot House, 227-233 Commercial Road & Stepney Town Hall
  - Motto: A Magnis Ad Maiora (From great things to greater)
- Coat of arms of the borough council
- Map of borough boundary

The Metropolitan Borough of Stepney was a Metropolitan borough in the County of London created in 1900. In 1965, it became part of the London Borough of Tower Hamlets.

== Formation and boundaries ==
The borough was formed from thirteen civil parishes and extra-parochial places: Christchurch Spitalfields, Liberty of Norton Folgate (part), Mile End New Town, Mile End Old Town, Old Artillery Ground, Ratcliff, St Anne Limehouse, St Botolph without Aldgate, St George in the East, St John of Wapping, St Mary Whitechapel, St Paul Shadwell and Tower of London.

In 1901, Tower of London was merged with St Botolph without Aldgate. In 1921, Ratcliff, St John of Wapping and St Paul Shadwell were merged with St Anne Limehouse; and Christchurch Spitalfields, Liberty of Norton Folgate, Mile End New Town, Old Artillery Ground and St Botolph without Aldgate were merged with St Mary Whitechapel. In 1927, the remaining four civil parishes were combined into a single civil parish called Stepney, which was conterminous with the metropolitan borough.

Previous to the borough's formation it had been administered by four separate local bodies: Limehouse Board of Works, Whitechapel Board of Works, Old Town Vestry and St George in the East Vestry.

The area maps roughly to the London postcode E1.

The road sign in front of Mile End tube station and a street sign on Leman Street in Aldgate still have the wording "Borough of Stepney" just visible on them.

== Borough seal and coat of arms ==
Borough seal adopted in 1900

On the formation of the metropolitan borough the corporation adopted a seal depicting the patron saints of the parishes that made up the borough. These were St Anne, Limehouse, St Mary Matfelon, Whitechapel, St Dunstan, for Stepney and St George in the East. In the centre was a depiction of the Tower of London. At the top of the seal was a sailing ship, recalling the legend that all persons born on the high seas, could claim Stepney as their birthplace. The more modern ship and quayside at the bottom of the seal was for the borough's docks. On the left of the seal was a picture of a steam locomotive, for the London and Blackwall Railway, and on the right a loom for the historic weaving industry.

In 1931, the seal was replaced by an official coat of arms, granted by the College of Arms. The main item on the shield is a ship on the waves of the sea, for the various maritime interests of Stepney. At the top of the shield are shown a version of the arms of the City of London, but with an anchor replacing the sword in the city's arms. On either side of this were placed smith's tongs, symbol of St Dunstan, patron saint of Stepney. The crest on the top of the helm featured a mural crown, representing the battlements of the Tower of London. Atop the crown were two crossed gold anchors. The Latin motto: A magnis ad maiora, can be translated as from great things to greater. When Stepney became part of the London Borough of Tower Hamlets, the arms of the new borough were based on Stepney's, and an English-language version of the motto was adopted.

== Population and area ==
The area of the borough was 1,766 acres (7.1 km^{2}). The populations recorded in National Censuses were:

Constituent parishes 1801-1899

| Year | 1801 | 1811 | 1821 | 1831 | 1841 | 1851 | 1861 | 1871 | 1881 | 1891 |
| Population | 113,281 | 131,606 | 153,749 | 175,088 | 203,802 | 238,910 | 257,497 | 275,467 | 282,676 | 285,225 |

Metropolitan Borough 1900-1961

| Year | 1901 | 1911 | 1921 | 1931 | 1941 | 1951 | 1961 |
| Population | 298,600 | 279,804 | 249,657 | 225,238 | | 98,858 | 92,000 |

== Politics ==
A map showing the wards of Stepney Metropolitan Borough as they appeared in 1916.

The borough was divided into nineteen wards for elections: Centre, Limehouse North, Limehouse South, Mile End New Town, North East, North, Ratcliffe, Shadwell, South East, South, Spitalfields East, Spitalfields West, St George in the East North, St George in the East South, The Tower, West, Whitechapel East, Whitechapel Middle and Whitechapel South.

=== Parliament constituency ===
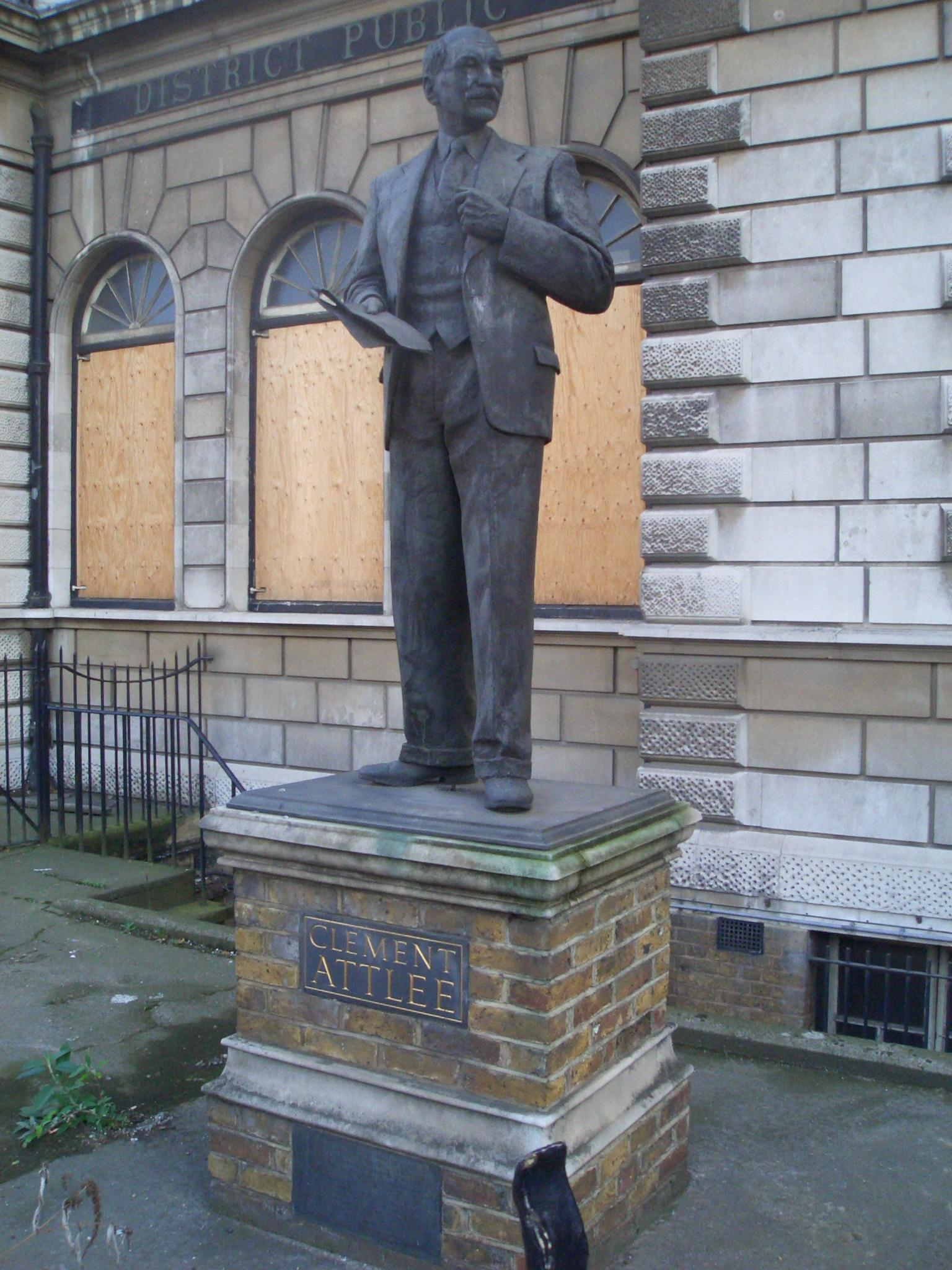
A statue of Clement Attlee, mayor of Stepney (1919) and MP for Limehouse stands outside Limehouse Library.

For elections to Parliament, the borough was divided into five constituencies:

- Tower Hamlets, Limehouse division
- Tower Hamlets, Mile End division
- Tower Hamlets, St George division
- Tower Hamlets, Stepney division
- Tower Hamlets, Whitechapel division

In 1918, the borough's representation was reduced to three seats:

- Limehouse
- Mile End
- Whitechapel and St George's

In 1950, the borough's representation was reduced to one seat:

- Stepney

== See also ==
- London Government Act 1899
- Metropolis Management Act 1855
