= Battle of Holbeck Moor =

1936 Anti-fascist demonstration in Leeds

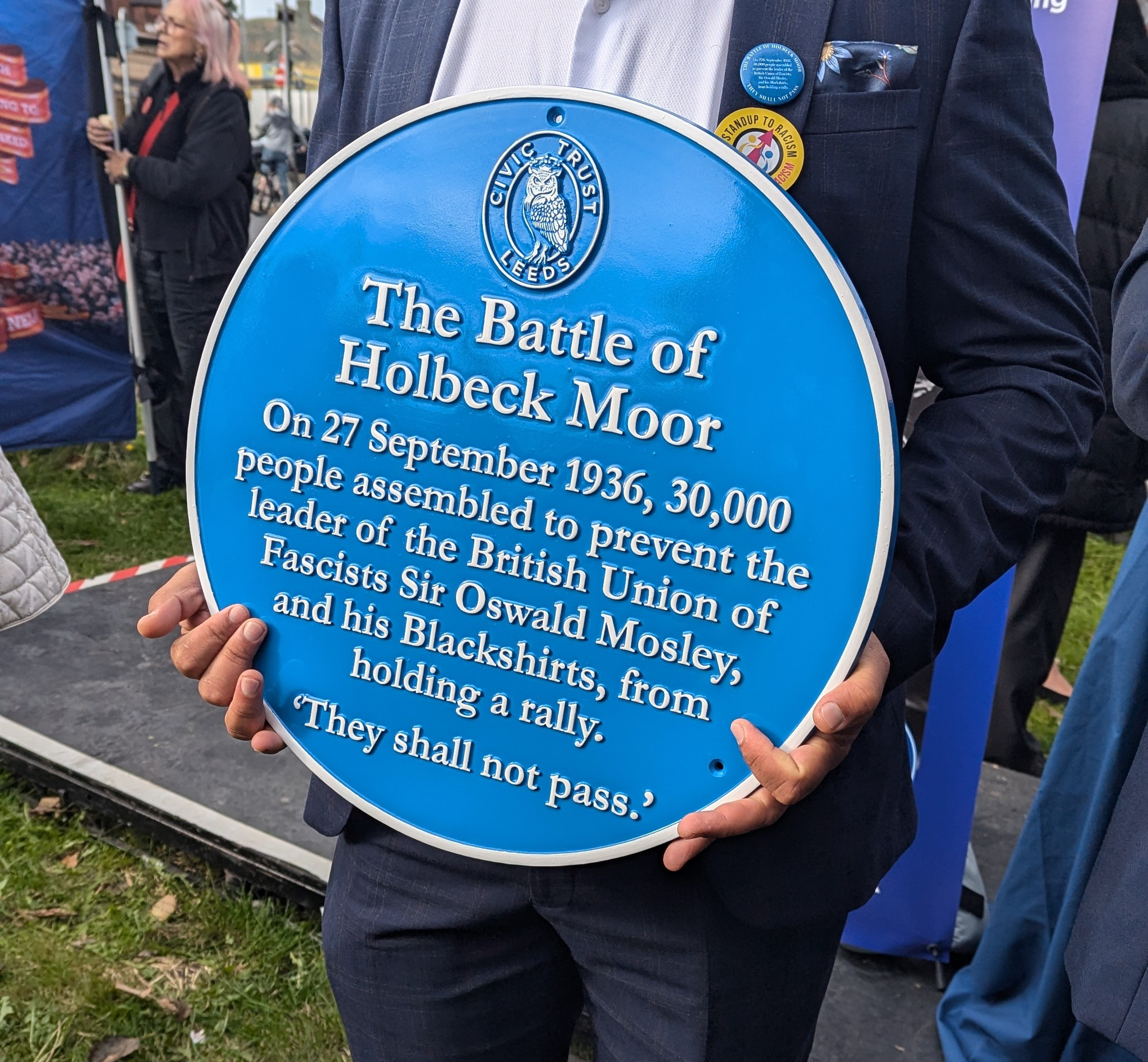
- Leeds Civic Trust plaque commemorating the event, during its unveiling on 29th September 2024
- Date: 27 September 1936
- Location: Holbeck, Leeds, United Kingdom
- Caused by: Opposition to a fascist march through Leeds
- Methods: Protest

Parties
British Union of Fascists (Blackshirts)	Anti-fascists: Communist Party of Great Britain; Socialists; Trade unionists; British Jews	Leeds City Police

Lead figures
Sir Oswald Mosley	

Number
1,000	30,000	

Casualties and losses
40 injured, of which 14 taken to infirmary		

The Battle of Holbeck Moor was a clash between the British Union of Fascists and various anti-fascist demonstrators that took place in Holbeck, Leeds, on 27 September 1936.

== Background ==
Led by Oswald Mosley, the British Union of Fascists planned to march through the Leylands, a working-class Jewish quarter in Leeds. The Leeds City Watch Committee rejected their plans, fearing an outbreak of riots. Since the committee had not banned the fascists from marching elsewhere, they changed the route to march from Calverley Street (in the city centre) to Holbeck Moor.

In the days before the march, anti-fascists (primarily the Communist Party of Great Britain) set about countering the march, distributing flyers to workers in the engineering, textile and tailoring factories and on working-class housing estates, calling for a mobilisation against Mosley and his fascists. Due to differences, the Labour Party refused to attend and help the Communist Party.

The night before the march, the Leylands was targeted with swastikas and slogans daubed on windows and doors, and Jewish people were attacked in the streets.

== Events ==
On the 27th of September, the blackshirts met at Calverley Street, and were greeted with a small amount of booing. They then marched down the Headrow, Briggate, Meadow Lane, Dewsbury Road, Trentham Street, Tempest Road and Beeston Road, before finishing at the side of Holbeck Moor near St Matthew’s School.

Mosley joined the march near the end, at Beeston Road. On arriving at Holbeck Moor, the fascists were met by 30,000 anti-fascist demonstrators led by the Leeds Communist Party branch. With horse-mounted police forces shielding the fascists, Mosley climbed on top of a van and attempted to give a speech, but was quickly drowned out by protesters who had surrounded the van, singing the socialist song 'The Red Flag' repeatedly.

The stand-off then became violent, with protesters pelting Mosley and the blackshirts with stones. The excitement and danger grew as mounted police then went into the crowd to arrest those throwing stones. Realising they were vastly outnumbered, the fascists retreated with great difficulty from the moor.

During the clash, Mosley was hit twice with stones, resulting in a gash under one eye. This wound was still visible when he attempted to march at Cable Street in London a week later. 40 blackshirts were also injured, of which 14 were treated at an infirmary.

== Aftermath ==
The Battle reinforced opposition to fascism in the city, and the news of the battle spread through anti-fascist movements elsewhere in the UK, and helped serve as inspiration in the planning for the more famous Battle of Cable Street, which took place on 4 October 1936 in London. In the build-up to Cable Street, publications such as the Daily Worker proclaimed that “what happened in Leeds must happen in East London!”

The day after the march, Mosley made a statement in the Leeds Mercury:

In a statement after the meeting, Sir Oswald Mosley said it was only a small number of men, organised for the purpose, who had tried to upset the meeting.

"Stones were aimed particularly at women Blackshirts," he said, "and the ambulances carrying the injured were stoned. Despite this organised violence the meeting was carried through according to schedule. "I thought the police handled the situation splendidly. I respect the decision of the Leeds Watch Committee not to interfere with our meeting."

— A Statement., Leeds Mercury 28th Sept 1936

The Leeds Mercury also published a list of names and addresses of the injured who received medical treatment, The participants were brought in from distant towns and cities such as Newcastle, Liverpool, Blackburn, Scunthorpe, Lincoln and Lancaster. Few were from Leeds.

== Legacy ==
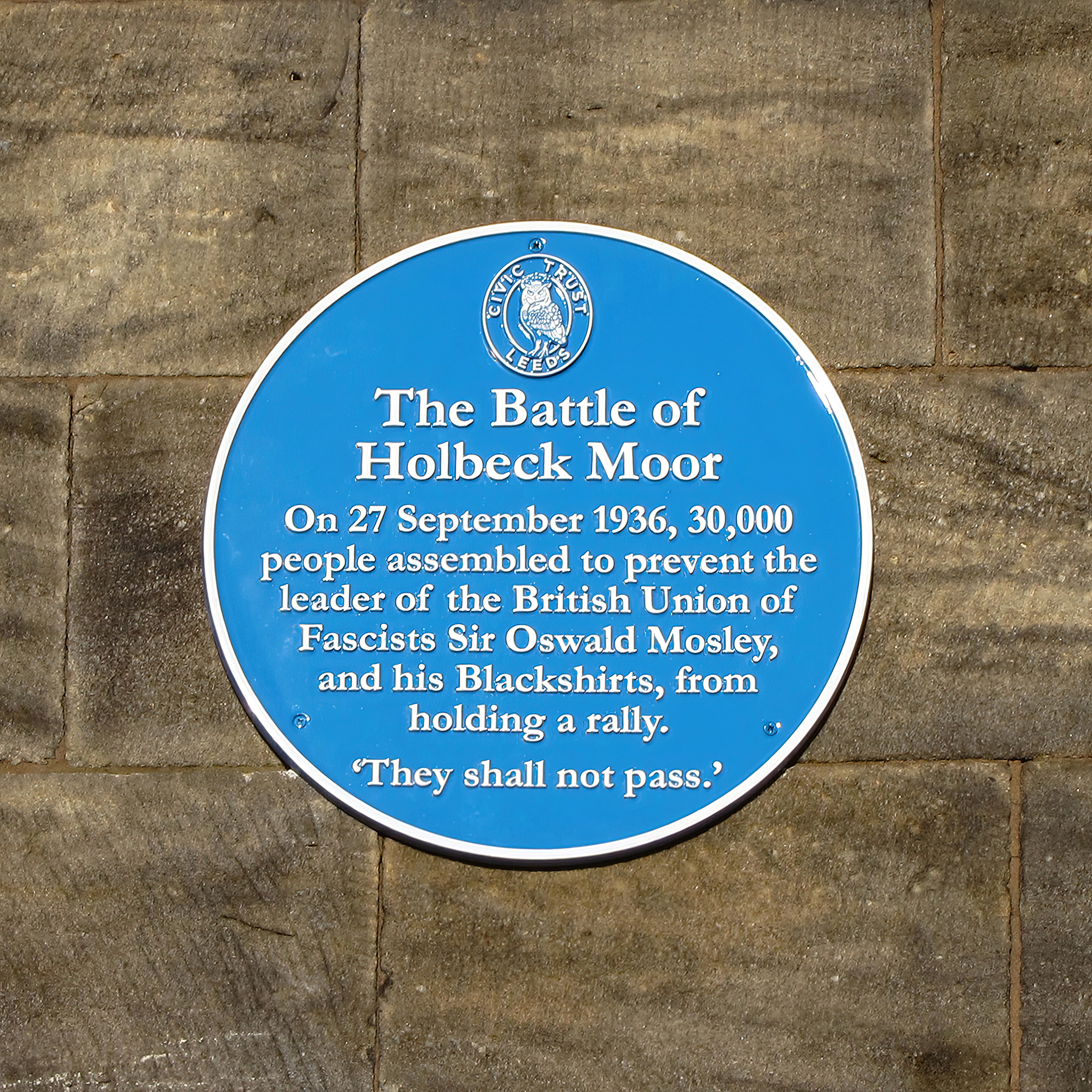
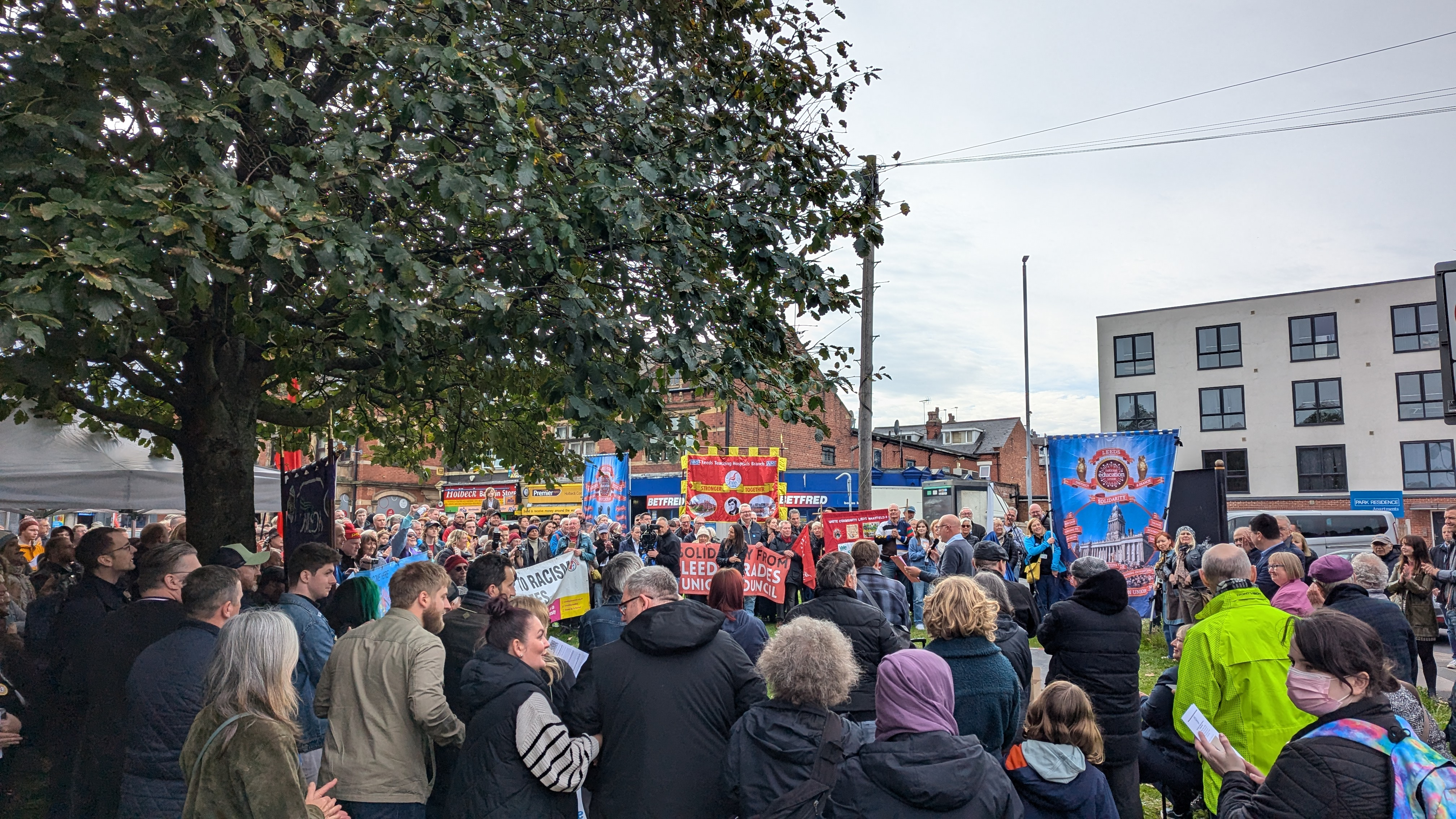

In January 2020, John Mann, Baron Mann cited the Battle in his maiden speech in the House of Lords, stating:

"For 70 years my family lived alongside Holbeck Moor in those two-up, two-down, back-to-back terraces and cobbled streets. I cannot claim with certainty that one of them threw the cobble that put Mosley in hospital, but there were 30,000 heroes yet nothing recorded."

A blue plaque dedicated to the event was unveiled on 29 September 2024 at Holbeck Moor, to a crowd of over 300. The plaque was commissioned by Stand Up To Racism and Leeds Civic Trust. The unveiling was attended by Fabian Hamilton, Hilary Benn and Richard Burgon as well as descendants of participants. It is now fixed to the south wall of St Matthew's Church, facing the moor.

== See also ==
- Battle of Stockton – an earlier incident between BUF members and anti-fascists in Stockton-on-Tees on 10 September 1933
- Battle of South Street – an incident between BUF members and anti-fascists in Worthing on 9 October 1934
- Battle of De Winton Field – a clash between BUF members and anti-fascists in the Rhondda on 11 June 1936
