= Dobson (surname) =

Dobson is an English and Scottish surname.

Notable people with this surname include:

== People ==
=== Acting ===
- Anita Dobson (born 1949), English actress
- The Dobson brothers, Michael, Paul, and Brian, English-Canadian voice actors
- Kevin Dobson (1943–2020), American television actor
- Peter Dobson (born 1964), American actor
- Tamara Dobson (1947–2006), American actress

=== Art ===
- Cowan Dobson born David Cowan (1894–1980), brother of Henry Raeburn, (1894–1980), Scottish portrait painter
- Frank Dobson (1886–1963), British artist
- Henry Raeburn Dobson (1901–1985), Scottish portrait and genre painter
- Margaret Dobson, American artist
- Mary Dobson, British artist
- William Dobson (1610–1646), English painter

=== Military ===
- Claude Congreve Dobson VC (1885–1940), British Royal Naval officer
- David Dobson (born 1938), British vice admiral in the Royal Navy
- Frederick William Dobson (1886–1935), British soldier
- Harry Dobson (International Brigades) (1907-1938) Welsh miner and International Brigades volunteer

=== Music ===
- Bonnie Dobson (born 1940), Canadian folk musician
- Dobby Dobson (1942–2020), Jamaican reggae singer and record producer
- Fefe Dobson (born 1985), Canadian singer and entertainer
- Richard Dobson (1942–2017), American singer-songwriter
- Simon Dobson (born 1981), English composer

=== Politics ===
- Benjamin Alfred Dobson (1847–1898), English industrialist and mayor of Bolton
- Frank Dobson (1940–2019), British politician
- Henry Dobson (1841–1918), Australian politician
- Jeremy Dobson, American politician
- Jo-Anne Dobson (born 1966), Northern Irish politician
- John Dobson (Canadian politician) (1824–1907) Canadian senator
- John Dobson (Northern Ireland politician) (1929–2009) Northern Irish politician
- Ruth Dobson (1918–1989), Australian diplomat
- Shelby Brianne Dobson (1995-) U.S. Texas politician
- Wiliam Polk Dobson (1783-1846), United States politician, Senator of North Carolina

=== Science ===
- Brian Dobson (1931–2012), English archaeologist
- Chris Dobson (1949–2019), British chemist
- David Clark Dobson (born 1962), American applied mathematician
- George Edward Dobson (1848-1895), Irish zoologist
- Gordon Dobson (1889–1975), British meteorologist
- John Dobson (amateur astronomer) (1915–2014), American popularizer of amateur astronomy

=== Sports ===
- Aaron Dobson (born 1991), American football player
- Austin Dobson (1912–1963), English racing driver
- Chuck Dobson (1944–2021), American baseball player
- Denys Dobson (1880–1916), England international rugby player
- Dominic Dobson (born 1957), German racing driver
- Frank Dobson (1885–1959), American college sports coach
- Joe Dobson (1917–1994), American baseball player
- Kenneth Dobson (1900–1960), English cricketer
- Mark Dobson (born 1962), English cricketer
- Noah Dobson (born 2000) Canadian ice hockey player
- Pat Dobson (1942–2006), American baseball player
- Tom Dobson (rugby union) (1871–1937), Scottish-born Wales international rugby player

=== Writing ===
- Austin Dobson (1840–1921), English poet
- Barrie Dobson (1931–2013), British historian
- Bridget and Jerome Dobson, American writers of the Santa Barbara soap opera
- Dennis Dobson (1919–1978), British book publisher
- Ed Dobson (1949–2015), American author and pastor
- Henry Austin Dobson (1840–1921), English poet and essayist
- Joanne Dobson, (born 1942), American novelist
- Rosemary Dobson (1920–2012), Australian poet

=== Other ===
- Arthur Dudley Dobson (1841–1934), New Zealand engineer and explorer
- Bryan Dobson (born 1960), Irish broadcaster
- Caroline Matilda Dodson (1845–1898), American physician
- Emily Dobson (1842–1934), Australian philanthropist
- George Dobson (disambiguation)
- Harmon Dobson (1913–1967), American entrepreneur and co-founder of Whataburger
- James Dobson (1936–2025), American conservative Christian psychologist and radio host
- John Dobson (1787–1865), English architect
- Michael Dobson (disambiguation)
- Naomi Pollard Dobson (1883–1971), American librarian and educator
- Paul Dobson (disambiguation)
- Vernon Dobson (1923–2013), American Baptist minister
- Wayne Dobson (1957–2025), English magician

== Fictional characters ==
- Lawrence Dobson, a fictional character in the TV series Firefly
- Zuleika Dobson, title character of a 1911 novel by Max Beerbohm
