= Battle of De Winton Field =

Clash between fascist and anti-fascist demonstrators in 1936 Wales

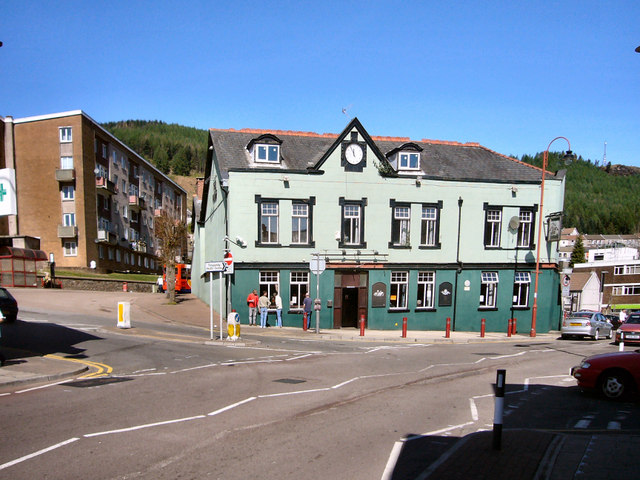
- Tonypandy town square in 2007, near the location of the 1936 anti-fascist demonstration
- Date: 11 June 1936
- Location: De Winton Field, Tonypandy, Wales, United Kingdom; 51.6224°N 3.4519°W
- Caused by: Opposition to a fascist rally in the Welsh Valleys
- Methods: Counter-demonstration, protest
- Result: British Union of Fascists (BUF) rally abandoned after 30 minutes; BUF's last attempt to hold a rally in Wales; 37 anti-fascist demonstrators charged with various offences; Several demonstrators given six-month prison sentences

Parties
British Union of Fascists: Blackshirts	Anti-fascists: Communist Party; Local socialist groups; Trade unionists; Local residents	Police: Local constabulary

Lead figures
Tommy Moran (BUF propaganda officer)	Annie Powell

Number
Small group of Blackshirts	c. 6,000	

Casualties
- Deaths: 0
- Arrested: 37
- Charged: 37 (on 187 counts)
- Last BUF rally attempt in Wales; some participants later joined International Brigades in Spanish Civil War

The Battle of De Winton Field was a significant anti-fascist confrontation that took place in Tonypandy, Wales, on 11 June 1936. The clash occurred when Tommy Moran, propaganda officer for the British Union of Fascists (BUF), attempted to hold a rally in the heart of the politically left-wing South Wales Valleys. Between 5,000 and 6,000 anti-fascist demonstrators, comprising local miners, socialists, communists, and trade unionists, mobilised to prevent the fascist meeting from taking place. After sustained heckling, stone-throwing, and overwhelming opposition, Moran and his small group of Blackshirts were forced to abandon their rally after just thirty minutes, marking the BUF's final attempt to establish a presence in Wales.

The confrontation resulted in 37 anti-fascist demonstrators being charged on 187 counts of riot and related offences, with several receiving six-month prison sentences. Four of those imprisoned would later volunteer for the International Brigades in the Spanish Civil War, which began just five weeks after the Tonypandy confrontation. Among them was Harry Dobson, a miner from Blaenclydach, who became a legendary figure in the International Brigades before being killed at the Battle of the Ebro in 1938. The battle thus represented both a decisive local victory against fascism and a stepping stone in the international fight against fascist movements across Europe.

== Background ==
=== Political context in the South Wales Valleys ===
By 1936, the South Wales Valleys had developed into one of Britain's most politically radical regions. The region's politics were "trade-union-led and avowedly left-wing", with "great socialist orators" rising "to national prominence, cementing the Valleys' reputation as a world apart from the rest of Britain". The Rhondda, more than any other of the Valleys, became "a self-reliant, hard-living, chapel-going, poor and terrifically spirited breeding ground for radical religion and firebrand politics". The Communist Party had such influence that the town of Maerdy earned the nickname "Little Moscow" by Fleet Street in the 1930s.

This radical political culture had deep roots in the region's industrial heritage. According to Glyn Owen, "Industrialisation and subsequent unionism had politicised generations of people in mining regions of South Wales". The Great Depression had hit the area particularly hard, with "nearly half of all men unemployed by 1932", creating fertile ground for left-wing political movements whilst simultaneously making the region hostile to fascist ideology.

=== The British Union of Fascists' Welsh campaign ===
The British Union of Fascists, founded by Sir Oswald Mosley in 1932, had initially enjoyed considerable support across Britain, claiming some 50,000 members by the summer of 1934. However, by 1936, the movement was experiencing significant challenges. The party's embrace of Nazi-style antisemitism in 1936 led to increasingly violent confrontations with anti-fascists, and membership had declined substantially.

In Wales, the BUF had struggled to make inroads, struggling to overcome the area's entrenched left-wing political culture. Recognising the importance of gaining support in Wales, Mosley undertook a broader reorganisation of BUF operations in Wales and sent experienced organisers to the region. Tommy Moran, a former Newcastle miner, Navy boxer, and qualified engineer who had joined the BUF in 1933 after leaving the Labour Party, was deployed to south Wales in 1934. His mining background made him an ideal candidate to connect with Welsh mining communities, following the BUF's strategy of sending organisers that local populations could identify with.

== Events ==
=== BUF planning ===
BUF propaganda officer Tommy Moran, accompanied by a small group of Blackshirts and a small black van fitted with loudspeakers, scheduled a rally to be held in a field near the Tonypandy town centre. The choice of location was strategic yet problematic for the fascists. "The BUF had not advertised its meeting in Tonypandy knowing full-well the reputation of the area", understanding that the Valleys' strong socialist and communist traditions would likely generate significant opposition.

"Despite their attempts at secrecy, when the news leaked of the shortly pending arrival, thousands of people were quickly assembled and mobilised". The local left-wing and anti-fascist groups, which included socialists, communists, trade unionists, and local residents, quickly learned of the rally and began organising their response. Annie Powell, who later became mayor of Penygraig and the first communist mayor in the UK, has stated that the anti-fascist organisers swore that "not even one Welsh sheep will hear the Mosley message." This defiant declaration reflected the determined opposition that the BUF would face in attempting to spread their message in the politically hostile environment of the Welsh Valleys.

=== Rally and counter-demonstration ===
On the morning of 11 June 1936, a small black BUF van equipped with large loudspeakers arrived in Tonypandy. The vehicle patrolled the streets, announcing that there would be a meeting in De Winton Field, a nearby open area near the town centre. Tommy Moran and his small group of Blackshirts set up their makeshift platform, likely using a ladder to access the roof of the van to address the assembled crowd.

When the rally was due to be held, the scale of the anti-fascist response became immediately apparent. According to newspaper reports from the time, "a crowd of 5,000-6,000 'socialists and communists' turned out at De Winton Field to confront the fascist speakers". This represented a stunning demonstration of the power of anti-fascist sentiment in the area, with the demonstrators vastly outnumbering the small group of BUF organisers.

The anti-fascist crowd was diverse, comprising local miners, trade unionists, socialists, communists, and residents from across the Valleys. Many had direct experience of political activism, including some who had participated in previous industrial disputes such as the Tonypandy Riots of 1910–11, which had established the area's reputation for militant resistance to authority.

Protected by police, the fascists attempted to hold their speeches, but were immediately drowned out by jeers, whistles, and heckling from the protesters. The anti-fascist demonstrators employed various tactics to disrupt the meeting, creating such a din that Moran and his colleagues found it virtually impossible to deliver their message. The situation escalated when "the situation soon turned violent, with stones being hurled at the fascists who attempted to continue their speeches". The protesters had come prepared for confrontation, and as tensions rose, missiles including stones and other projectiles were thrown at the BUF speakers. Despite police protection, the fascists found themselves under sustained attack from the hostile crowd.

Faced with overwhelming opposition and unable to deliver their speeches effectively, the BUF organisers were forced to abandon their rally. "After just half an hour, the fascists were forced to give up the rally and flee." The speed of the fascists' withdrawal - lasting only thirty minutes from start to finish - demonstrated both the effectiveness of the anti-fascist mobilisation and the BUF's inability to cope with such sustained and organised opposition. The retreat marked a decisive victory for the anti-fascist demonstrators and represented a humiliating defeat for the BUF's attempts to establish a foothold in Wales.

The event concluded with the demonstrators successfully preventing the spread of fascist propaganda in their community, and they likely celebrated their victory at the nearby De Winton Inn, after which the field was named.

== Aftermath ==
=== Arrests and legal proceedings ===
The confrontation had immediate legal consequences for the anti-fascist demonstrators. "37 participants in the battle, including several women, would be charged by police on 187 counts of riot, incitement to riot, unlawful assembly, breach of the peace, and disturbing a public meeting". The scale of the charges reflected the authorities' determination to prosecute those who had disrupted the BUF rally, despite the fact that the fascists had been the ones attempting to spread their message in a hostile environment. "Several of those demonstrators were given six-month prison sentences". Among those imprisoned was Harry Dobson, a miner from Blaenclydach who "was well regarded amongst the men of the battalion as a good soldier with strong political convictions. He was an active trade unionist and a staunch anti-fascist, as demonstrated by imprisonment for his actions during the Battle of De Winton Fields in Tonypandy".

=== Impact on the BUF in Wales ===
The Battle of De Winton Field marked a decisive turning point for the British Union of Fascists' activities in Wales. The event proved to be "the BUF's last attempt to hold a rally in Wales".

The humiliating defeat at Tonypandy, where a small group of fascists had been overwhelmed by thousands of anti-fascist demonstrators, effectively ended any serious prospect of the BUF establishing a meaningful presence in the Welsh Valleys.

The failure at De Winton Field demonstrated the fundamental problem facing the BUF in Wales: the entrenched political culture of the region, with its strong traditions of socialism, trade unionism, and collective action, proved completely incompatible with fascist ideology. The speed and scale of the anti-fascist mobilisation showed that the Valleys remained hostile territory for Mosley's movement.

=== The Spanish Civil War connection ===
A notable aspect of the battle's aftermath was the direct connection between the anti-fascist resistance in Tonypandy and the fight against fascism in Spain during the Spanish Civil War that broke out later in 1936. According to Hywel Francis, "some of the anti-fascist participants in the battle would later volunteer for the International Brigades, helping fight fascism in the Spanish Civil War... Welsh volunteers would end up representing the largest regional industrial grouping within the British Battalion of the International Brigades." The battle thus became part of a broader narrative of Welsh anti-fascist resistance that extended from the Valleys to the battlefields of Spain. The men who had stood against Tommy Moran's Blackshirts in 1936 carried that same spirit of resistance to the trenches of Aragon and Catalonia, where they fought alongside volunteers from across the world against the forces of international fascism.

Four of those charged would later volunteer to fight for the Spanish Republic in the Spanish Civil War, which erupted just under five weeks later: Harry Dobson, miner from Blaenclydach; Hector Manning, miner from Dinas; William Bevan, miner from Penygraig; and William Price, miner from Ton Pentre. This reflected not only the strong anti-fascist sentiment in Wales but also the direct line that could be drawn from local resistance to fascism, as demonstrated at De Winton Field, to international solidarity in the fight against Franco's rebellion. Harry Dobson would become a notable figure in the International Brigades. Upon his release from Swansea prison, Dobson famously asked: "How do I get to Spain?" He survived the sinking of the troop ship Ciudad de Barcelona, which was torpedoed by an Italian submarine in June 1937, and went on to serve with distinction as political commissar of the Major Attlee Company. Dobson was fatally wounded during the Battle of the Ebro on 28 July 1938, and died the following day.

== See also ==
- Battle of Stockton – an earlier incident between BUF members and anti-fascists in Stockton-on-Tees on 10 September 1933
- Battle of South Street – a clash between BUF members and anti-fascists in Worthing on 9 October 1934
- Battle of Holbeck Moor – a clash between BUF members and anti-fascists in Leeds on 27 September 1936
- Battle of Cable Street – a clash between BUF members and anti-fascists in the East End of London on 4 October 1936
