= Battle of Stockton =

1933 violent confrontation in Stockton-on-Tees, England

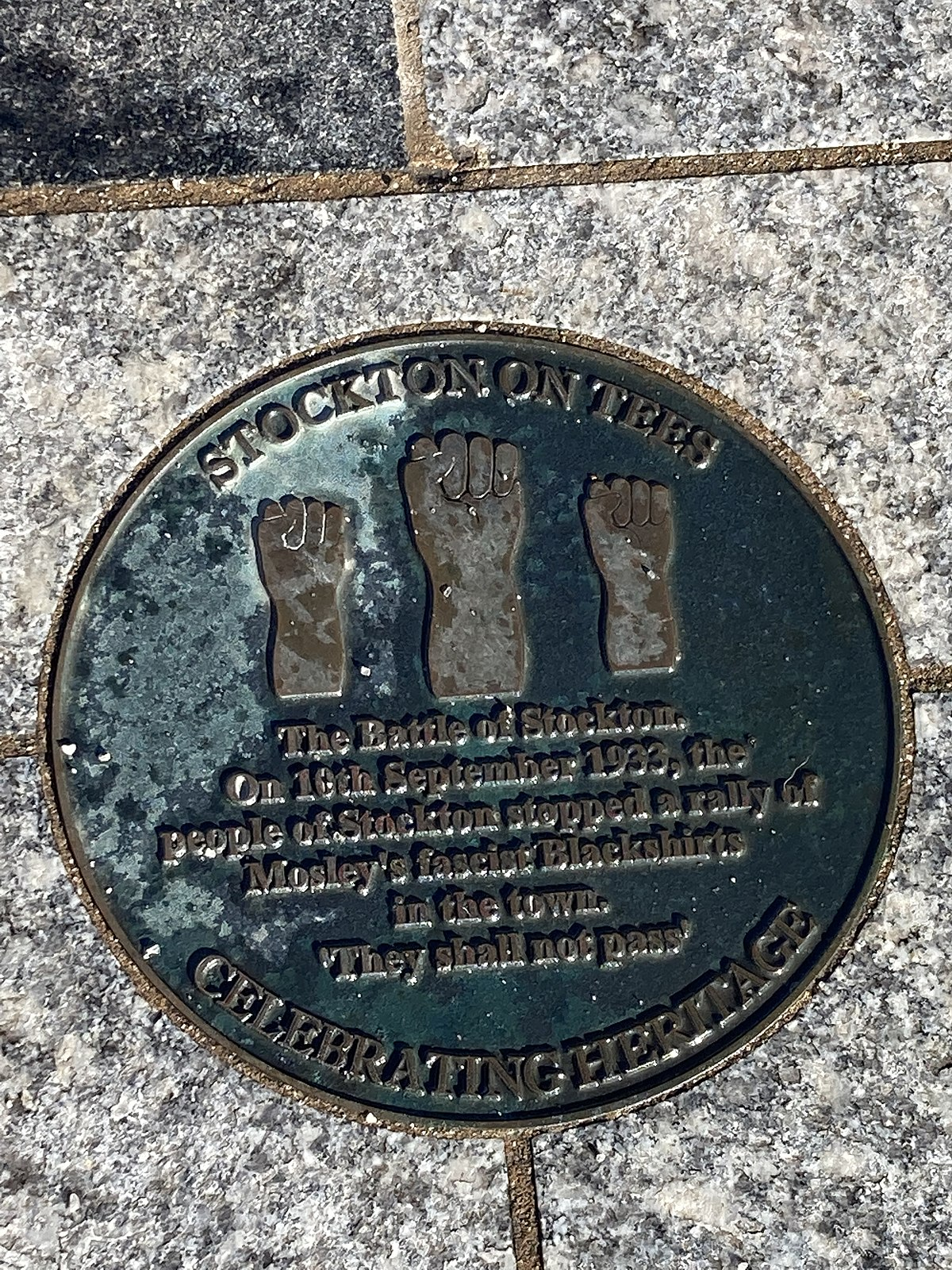
- The plaque by the Market Cross, Stockton-on-Tees, marking the event.
Date	10 September 1933
Location	Market Cross, Stockton-on-Tees, United Kingdom
Result	Anti-fascist victory: BUF meeting in Stockton-on-Tees called off.

Belligerents
British Union of Fascists: Blackshirts	Anti-fascists: Communist Party; National Unemployed Workers' Movement

Commanders and leaders
Michael Jordan	George Short

Strength
30	2,000–3,000

Casualties and losses
~ 2 injured	0

The Battle of Stockton, took place on 10 September 1933 at the Market Cross in the High Street of Stockton-on-Tees, County Durham, England. It was a clash between members of the British Union of Fascists (BUF) and anti-fascist demonstrators from the small local Communist Party and National Unemployed Workers Movement (NUWM).

== Background ==
Stockton was hit hard by the economic recession following the Great Depression. In June 1933, Oswald Mosley announced an offensive, aiming to expand the BUF beyond its headquarters in London and base in Manchester. George Short, the Communist Party District Organiser for Teesside, had spent almost three years at the International Lenin School in Moscow. On his return, in late 1931, he threw himself into political activism on Teesside.

Whilst the Stockton contingent of the NUWM were on the 1932 National Hunger March, the Stockton magistrates banned Short's NUWM Saturday evening surgeries that were held at the Market Cross on Stockton High Street. These were to assist the unemployed, especially fighting the despised Means Test. In response Short relocated, helping the unemployed in the churchyard of Holy Trinity Church and holding his political meetings at the Five Lamps in Thornaby. As only the NUWM and CPGB were barred from holding meetings at the Market Cross, Short and his wife Phyllis organised a series of demonstrations, culminating in a march up and down Stockton's High Street.

On 30 March 1933, Short, his wife Phyllis, David Catterick, Patrick O'Neil and Henry Walker were arrested for defying the ban and marching up and down the High Street. The men were charged with resisting the police, disturbance of the peace and the very serious charge of inciting others to commit violence (which held a minimum sentence of 10 yrs and could go up to a life sentence). Phyllis was charged with obstructing the police.

"Despite her size my grandmother was a formidable woman: whilst being roughly manhandled by a big policeman she bit him on the hand She was charged with assaulting the policeman. Mind you, as George said, 'she did get through to the bone.'"

On 3 April 1933 at the Magistrates Court, although found not guilty of inciting others to commit violence, Short and Catterick refused to be bound over to keep the peace and were sentenced to three months in Durham Prison, where Short would be later joined by his close friend Wilf Jobling. When the 5-foot-tall Phyllis was asked if she had assaulted the 6 foot 6 inch Superintendent Hammond standing next to her, her shrug reduced everyone in the magistrates court to fits of laughter. The judge reluctantly found Phyllis guilty. She, for the sake of their children, agreed to be bound over and to pay 10 shillings.

On 5 April 1933, 'considerable commotion was cause on the High Street' when the NUWM protested against the imprisonment of George Short and David Catterick.

"I was in prison when the first attempt by the Mosley fascists to organise their first meeting on Teesside happened, and that was in Stockton. They held a meeting on Stockton's Cross, and whilst it was a rowdy meeting, they carried it off."

On George's release, he and Phyllis planned and organised 'real resistance' to the next BUF meeting. The BUF delayed their meeting until after George was released. The suggestion was that this was an attempt to have him arrested and charged with inciting others to commit violence. If charged for a second time, this would very likely result in a lengthy prison term for George.

== Events ==
The BUF's North East Organiser, Michael Jordan, planned to speak at the Market Cross on Sunday 10 September 1933. As there were only a handful of local members London sent the London based BUF speaker; Captain Vincent Collier; who would shortly after become the North East Propaganda Officer, they also sent to Stockton a dozen Tyneside members and a ominously a dozen from Manchester's newly formed 'Defence Force', these latter had been involved in a number of violent altercations in Cheetham Hill, they wore the black shirt as a uniform, which was later used by the BUF as a whole. When Collier and his 30 men arrived at Stockton's High Street they found the Market Cross occupied by George Short and a peaceful crowd of up to 3000 supporters. Surrounded as soon as they stepped off the bus Collier was prevented from speaking by the hecklers – the police report states "The hecklers were exclusively CP and NUWM members." The Police immediately ordered the meeting to be abandoned and escorted the BUF back to their two buses parked on the High Street.

As the BUF withdrew, a handful of the Blackshirts attacked individuals in the crowd, which resulted in isolated pockets of fighting which Collier elaborated upon for the newspapers, who eagerly repeated his fabrications.

"The Fascists appeared to be keen on fighting and we had to give them a sharp reminder to get moving and get away out of the town before any further damage was done."

Michael Jordan in his later report places the blame for the fighting firmly on the Manchester Defence Force, and one leader in particular.

"I was approached by an officer who told me our men had come for a fight and it would break their hearts if they were allowed to go back to Manchester without one. He stated he was from London Headquarters and would take the responsibility. I informed him that I was in charge of the area and would not stand for innocent people being bludgeoned, He deliberately attacked one of the crowd with the result that a riot started in a few seconds."

George Short's grandson gives an indication as to why the Teesside Communists were so successful; in contrast to the BUF, George ensured that the anti-fascist protesters were seen as non-violent.

"A group of comrades captured one of Mosley's Blackshirts and were heading towards the river with the intention of throwing him in. My grandfather persuaded them that if he died it would create a martyr, so they let him go."

There is an account of this incident written from a fascists' perspective, John Charnley, a Blackshirt originally from Hull, in his 1990 account of his time in the BUF:

"It was in one of these sweeps that Ned Warburton was felled. he was cut off and carried struggling by a group of Reds who were going to 'chuck him in the river'. Fortunately, a group of uncommitted locals outside a pub saw the incident, attacked the Reds and rescued him, bandaged his head and got him back to the Blackshirts during a lull in the fighting."

TWO MEN INJURED Fascist and Communist Clash Two young men, John Frank Rushford of Greytower, Durham and Thomas Edmond Warburton. of Unsworth, Berwick, sustained head injuries when stones were thrown during a clash between Fascists and Communists at Stockton, last night. A party of 30 Fascists from surrounding towns were holding a meeting in Stockton High Street, when, it is alleged, Communists created a disturbance. Both Rushford and Warburton were able to go home after treatment at hospital. Shields Daily News 11 September 1933

A modern version of the event claims that as the Fascist meeting started two thousand or more anti fascists appeared from the narrow streets roundabout and a fight started. The police ordered the crowd to disperse and ordered the Fascists back to their buses, and that the two thousand were made up exclusively of Trade Unionists and not communists

Contemporary reports of the event show vast differences between the police and press reports; The police were naturally keen to demonstrate that they competently and successfully handled a difficult situation, while the press were keen to sell papers and sensationalise the events. Vincent Collier supplied the press with sensational reports. Edward 'Ned' Warburton was one of the two Blackshirts injured at Stockton, losing the sight in one eye. Collier claimed the injury was due to being struck by a potato which had a cutthroat razor blade embedded in it, but Ned's brother John stated it was a stone. The myth was further elaborated upon in Richard Bellamy's We Marched with Mosley. The contemporary newspaper accounts and Bellamy's accounts have been, until very recently, the only sources; leading to a number of implausible misinterpretations which glorify the violence.

== Aftermath ==
The day afterwards a Communist Party demonstration was joined by the local Christian, Co-operative society and representatives of the small local Jewish community. One of the speakers was Rabbi Miller from Middlesbrough who said Britain was in danger from jeopardising liberty by Fascism and Hitlerism which needed to be nipped in the bud.

The Battle of Stockton was a hugely significant setback for the BUF on Teesside; resulting in Michael Jordan, who had been with Mosley in the New Party, submitting a long and rather acrimonious resignation letter. He left the movement taking a number of experienced activists with him. The diminished BUF relocated to Middlesbrough; in an interview recorded shortly before his death, George Short says:

"In Middlesbrough they learnt their lesson, they held no outdoor meeting, instead they held them in Middlesbrough Town Hall."

Short's continued anti-fascist campaign ensured that, despite relocating, the BUF never established a foothold on Teesside. Communists continued to disrupt BUF meetings; most notably when Mosley himself tried to speak at Middlesbrough Town Hall in February 1935 and June 1936, during the latter damage to the Town Hall resulted in local councillors objected to ratepayers footing the bill for policing. Thereafter the local authorities prevented the BUF from hiring halls anywhere on Teesside.

A month after the humiliation of Mosley in June 1936 Short was still resisting fascism, not just locally and nationally, but now internationally; he vetted and organised the twenty-one Volunteers for Liberty from Teesside who fought in the XV International Brigade for the Spanish Republican government during the Spanish Civil War.

"My job became a very difficult job because comrades who wanted to go to Spain had to report to me. When these lads fell, it was my job to go and visit their relatives and explain to them that they had fallen, and it was a very hard job."

== Commemoration ==
in 2012, local folk trio The Young'uns released "The Battle of Stockton" on their album When Our Grandfathers Said No.

Inspired by the 2011 article by David Walsh on 9 September 2018, a plaque produced by Stockton council to mark the demonstration was unveiled in the presence of David Walsh at the Market Cross by the town's mayor, Eileen Johnson. Other speakers at the commemoration were Stockton North MP Alex Cunningham, North-East MEP Jude Kirton-Darling, actress and president of the International Brigade Memorial Trust Marlene Sidaway, the convener of Cable Street 80; David Rosenberg and Unison's Claire Williams.

== See also ==
- Battle of South Street - an incident between BUF members and anti-fascists in Worthing on 9 October 1934.
- Battle of De Winton Field - a battle between BUF members and anti-fascists in Tonypandy on 11 June 1936.
- Battle of Cable Street - a later and larger battle between the London Metropolitan Police and anti-fascists in London in 1936.
