= Annie Powell =

Welsh Communist politician, teacher and trade unionist (1906–1986)

- Annie Powell, 1975

Mayor of Rhondda
- In office 1979–1980

Councillor for Penygraig
- In office 1955–1957

Councillor for Rhondda
- In office 1961–1981

Personal details
- Born: 8 September 1906 Ystrad, Rhondda, United Kingdom
- Died: 29 August 1986 (aged 79) Rhondda, United Kingdom
- Party: Labour Party (until 1938); Communist Party of Great Britain (1938–1986)
- Spouse: Trevor Evan Powell (1905–2006)
- Education: Pentre Higher Grade School; Glamorgan Training College, Barry
- Occupation: Teacher, trade unionist

Annie Powell (8 September 1906 – 29 August 1986) was a Welsh Communist politician, teacher, and trade unionist who served as Mayor of Rhondda from 1979 to 1980, making her the first Communist mayor in Wales and widely recognised as the first female Communist mayor in Britain. Born into a Welsh-speaking family in Ystrad, Rhondda, Powell witnessed the poverty of the Great Depression during her early teaching career, which led her to join the Labour Party and subsequently the Communist Party of Great Britain (CPGB) in 1938.

A dedicated educator for four decades, Powell taught in Welsh throughout her career and was active in the National Union of Teachers. She became a prominent figure in the CPGB, serving on its executive committee for 20 years and chairing the Welsh Committee for 25 years. Powell contested Rhondda East at several general elections from 1955 and, after thirteen attempts, was elected as a Communist councillor for Penygraig in 1955, later serving continuously from 1961 to 1981. She represented the CPGB at international conferences, notably impressing Soviet leader Nikita Khrushchev with her rendition of the Welsh national anthem at the 1960 International Meeting of Communist and Workers Parties in Moscow.

== Early life and education ==
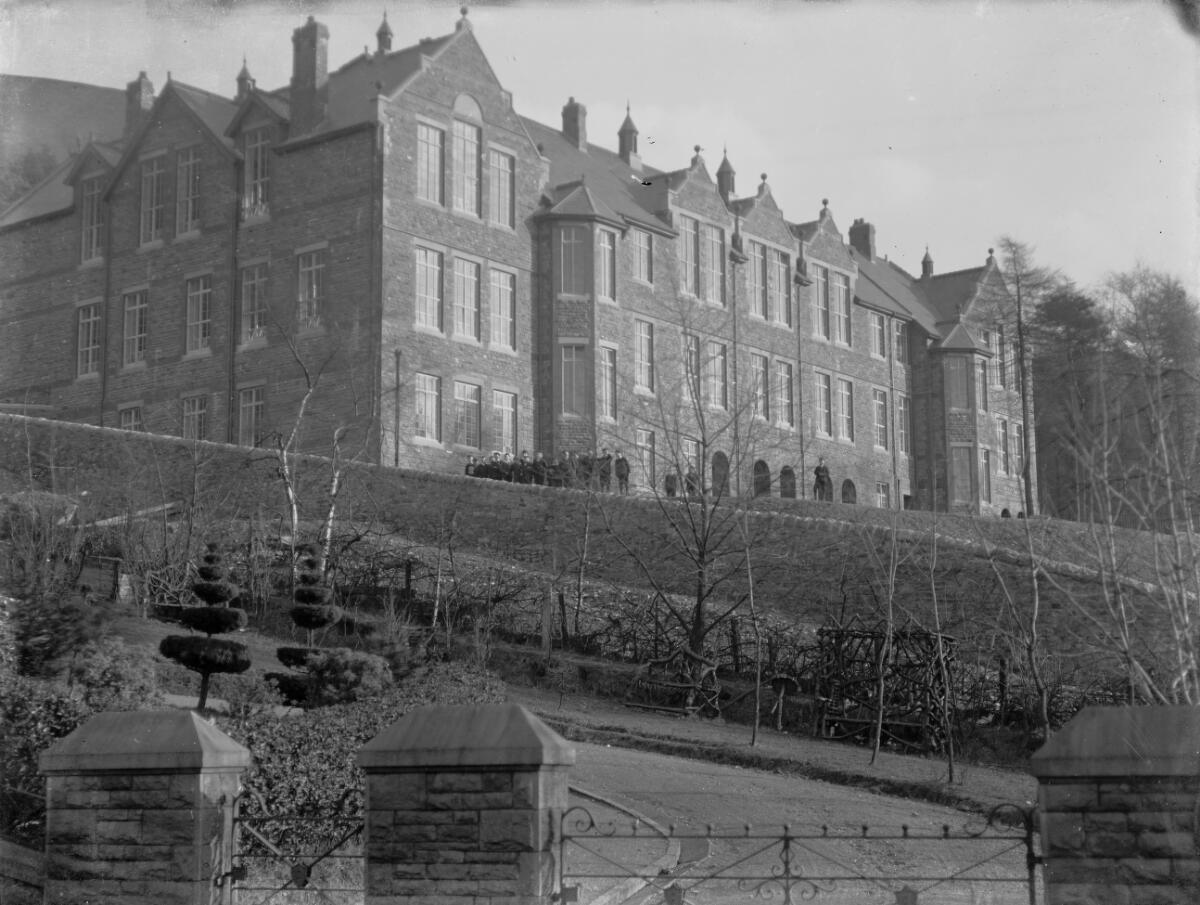
Pentre Grammar School, Pentre

Annie Powell was born on 8 September 1906 in Ystrad, Rhondda, Glamorgan. She was educated at Pentre Grammar School before attending Glamorgan Training College, Barry, in the 1920s to train as a teacher.

== Political awakening ==
Powell became interested in politics while at Glamorgan Training College during the period of the 1926 General Strike. When she started teaching at Trebanog and later in Trealaw during the Great Depression, she witnessed the great degree of poverty faced by the schoolchildren and their families: "The poverty of the children hit me really hard". She initially joined the Labour Party, but was impressed by the emphasis laid on theory and action by the Communist Party of Great Britain (CPGB). After what she described as "a lot of hard thought and deep thinking", she put aside her non-conformist religious background and joined the CPGB in 1938.

== Teaching career and union activities ==
Powell remained a teacher for 40 years and became active in the National Union of Teachers. Powell, a Welsh speaker, taught in Welsh throughout her career, which was unusual for the valleys in her day. She was awarded an honorary MA by the Open University for her support of students.

== Communist Party career ==
Powell sat on the Welsh Committee of the CPGB, as well as its executive committee for 20 years, and she was chair of the Welsh Committee for 25 years. At one time she was the party's women's organiser. She was a full time Party worker during the war years. In 1960, she was a CPGB delegate at a major conference of Communist parties in Moscow, where she claimed to have impressed Nikita Khrushchev with her rendition of "Hen Wlad fy Nhadau", the national anthem of Wales.

She said in one interview that she had learnt valuable lessons from such Communists as Arthur Horner, Harry Pollitt, Will Paynter, Jack Davies, and the South Walian Jack Jones.

=== Anti-fascist activism ===
Powell was actively involved in anti-fascist resistance in Wales during the 1930s. On 11 June 1936, she played a prominent role in organising the Battle of De Winton Field in Tonypandy, when between 5,000 and 6,000 anti-fascist demonstrators mobilised to prevent a British Union of Fascists (BUF) rally led by propaganda officer Tommy Moran.

Powell later recalled that the anti-fascist organisers swore that "not even one Welsh sheep will hear the Mosley message". The confrontation successfully forced the BUF to abandon their rally after just thirty minutes, marking their last attempt to hold a meeting in Wales.

== Electoral campaigns ==
Powell contested Rhondda East for the party at several general elections from 1955. At the general election of 1959 she secured 4,580 votes. Despite taking over as the long-time communist parliamentary candidate for Rhondda East in 1955, Powell understood she could not win. She consistently came second to Labour, but prided herself on always finishing above the Conservative and Plaid Cymru candidates, and she never lost her deposit. In 1959, with the help of some 150 supporters, she achieved "a practically complete canvass of the constituency", organising 18 indoor meetings and a loudspeaker car touring the constituency morning, afternoon and night. Her campaign secured 4,589 votes and resulted in 49 new members joining the Communist Party.

== Local government service ==
In 1955, after thirteen attempts, Powell was elected as a Communist councillor for Penygraig. She approached fifty when she began her remarkable council career. She lost the seat in 1957 when Labour used anti-communist arguments, citing Hungary. She narrowly missed winning a council seat in 1959 by just 154 votes.

She was deeply involved in community organisations and was vice-president of Morlais Male Voice Choir. She was also one of the first trustees of Valleys Kids, a charity supporting individuals, families and communities to achieve their full potential.

=== Mayor of the Rhondda ===
In 1978, she was elected Deputy Mayor. In 1979, she was appointed mayor.

As such, she is often said to have been Britain's only Communist mayor, although Finlay Hart had held an equivalent post as provost in Clydebank and Joe Vaughan in Bethnal Green can also claim to be the first Communist mayor in Britain.

== Personal life ==
Powell was supported by her husband, fellow-Communist Trevor Evan Powell (1905-2006), who was the manager of the local Co-operative store for many years. Trevor outlived her by 20 years and died aged 100 in 2006.

== Death and legacy ==
Powell died on 29 August 1986 at her home in the Rhondda Valley.

A blue plaque was unveiled in her honour on 6 June 2025 at Valleys Kids' Soar Centre in Penygraig, reading "Annie Powell. An inspiring social campaigner, respected across political divides." The application for the blue plaque was made by Dr Chris Chapman, former chair of Women's Archive Wales, working with Darren Macey of Rhondda Heritage.
