= Harry Dobson (International Brigades) =

Welsh miner and International Brigades volunteer (1907–1938)

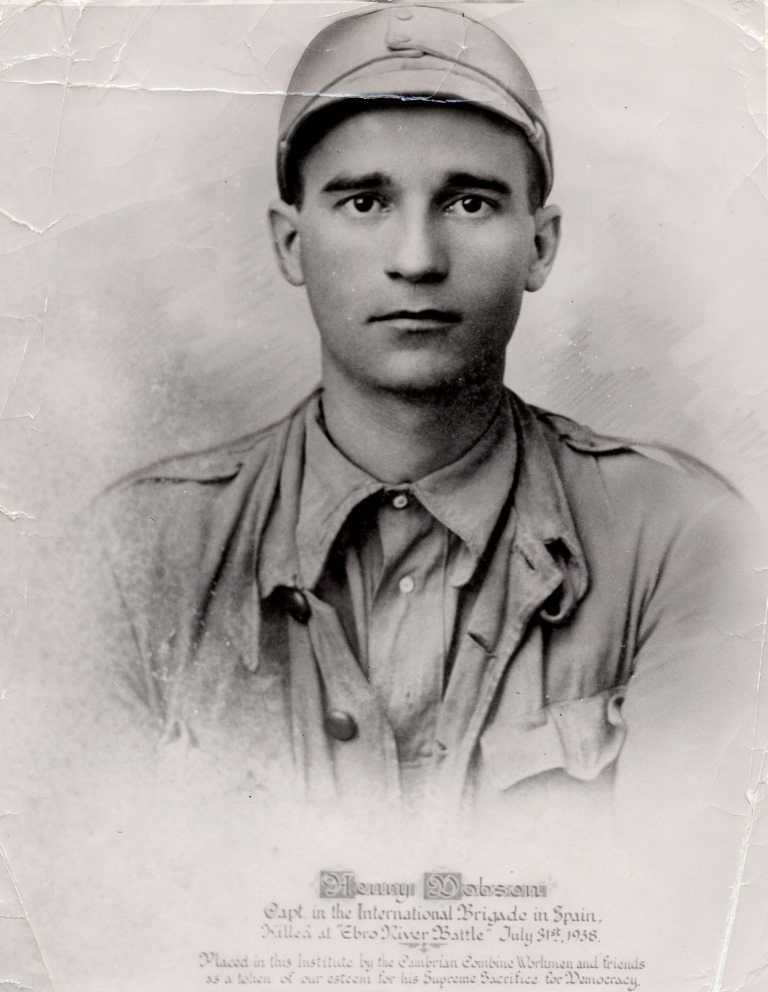
- Memorial photograph erected by Cambrian Combine Workmen and friends in tribute to Dobson's "Supreme Sacrifice for Democracy"
- Born: 9 August 1907; Tonypandy, Rhondda, Wales
- Died: 29 July 1938 (aged 30); La Bisbal de Falset, Catalonia, Spain
- Cause of death: Wounds received in the Battle of the Ebro
- Burial place: Cemetery of La Bisbal de Falset
- Military career
- Allegiance: Spanish Republic
- Branch: International Brigades
- Rank: Political Commissar
- Unit: British Battalion
- Commands: Major Attlee Company
- Conflicts: Battle of De Winton Field; Spanish Civil War; Battle of Brunete; Battle of Belchite; Battle of Teruel; Battle of the Ebro

Harry Dobson (9 August 1907 – 29 July 1938) was a Welsh coal miner, trade unionist, and communist activist who became a prominent figure in the International Brigades during the Spanish Civil War. Born in Tonypandy in the South Wales Valleys, Dobson was radicalised by unemployment, poor working conditions, and the rise of fascism in 1930s Britain. He played a key role in the Battle of De Winton Field in 1936, a significant anti-fascist confrontation that marked the British Union of Fascists' final attempt to hold a rally in Wales. After serving six months in prison for his role in the confrontation, Dobson departed for Spain in 1937, surviving the torpedoing of the Ciudad de Barcelona before joining the British Battalion. He served with distinction as political commissar of the Major Attlee Company and was fatally wounded during the Battle of the Ebro, the longest and bloodiest battle of the Spanish Civil War, dying on 29 July 1938.

== Early life and background ==
Harry Dobson was born on 9 August 1907 at 121 Dunraven Street in Tonypandy, in the heart of the Rhondda Valley. He was the son of an English father who worked as a coal miner and trade unionist, and a mother from Abersychan in Monmouthshire. Dobson was one of eleven children in the family.

Like his father, Dobson began working as a coal miner and was employed at Blaenclydach pit. He became an active member of the South Wales Miners' Federation and joined the Rhondda branch of the Communist Party of Great Britain in 1929. His political consciousness was shaped by the harsh economic conditions of the 1930s, unemployment, poor working conditions, and the rise of fascist movements across Europe.

== Anti-fascist activism ==
Dobson was actively involved in the trade union movement and campaigned against the rise of fascism in Wales. He worked as a miner until 1931, when he was victimised for his political activities and became unemployed. Despite this setback, he continued his activism and became a prominent figure in local anti-fascist resistance.

=== Battle of De Winton Field ===
On 11 June 1936, Dobson participated in the Battle of De Winton Field, a significant anti-fascist confrontation in Tonypandy. When Tommy Moran, propaganda officer for the British Union of Fascists (BUF), attempted to hold a rally, between 5,000 and 6,000 anti-fascist demonstrators mobilised to prevent the meeting. The confrontation marked the BUF's final attempt to hold a rally in Wales and preceded the more famous Battle of Cable Street in London by several months. Local anti-fascist organisers, including Annie Powell who later became the first communist mayor in the UK, reportedly swore that "not even one Welsh sheep will hear the Mosley message". Dobson was among 37 people arrested and charged on 187 counts of riot, incitement to riot, unlawful assembly, breach of the peace, and disturbing a public meeting.

Dobson was sentenced to six months in Swansea prison for his role in the confrontation. Upon his release, he famously asked: "How do I get to Spain?" The Spanish Civil War had erupted just five weeks after the Tonypandy confrontation, and Dobson was determined to continue his fight against fascism on an international stage.

== Spanish Civil War service ==
Dobson was instrumental in encouraging solidarity with the Spanish Republic, suggesting that the executive committee of the South Wales Miners' Federation should send a delegate to Spain to demonstrate their support. He departed for Spain in May 1937, joining the International Brigades as part of the international effort to support the Second Spanish Republic against Franco's rebellion. His journey to Spain was perilous from the outset.

=== Ciudad de Barcelona incident ===
On his way to Spain, Dobson survived the sinking of the troopship Ciudad de Barcelona, which was torpedoed by the Italian submarine General Sanjurjo (originally named Torricelli) off the coast of Malgrat de Mar, north of Barcelona, on 30 May 1937. The ship was carrying between 200 and 250 International Brigades volunteers from multiple countries when it was attacked in two phases, with at least 60-65 people dying in the attack. Dobson was among the survivors who were rescued by local fishermen from Malgrat de Mar and brought ashore. The experience demonstrated both the international nature of the conflict and the dangers faced by volunteers attempting to reach Spain.

=== Military service ===
Dobson arrived at the British Battalion in June 1937 and immediately went into action at the Battle of Brunete, where he was wounded. After recovering from his injuries, he succeeded Walter Tapsell as battalion political commissar, a role that reflected both his political experience and the respect he had earned from his fellow volunteers.

As political commissar of the Major Attlee Company, Dobson was "well regarded amongst the men of the battalion as a good soldier with strong political convictions". Military historian Hywel Francis described him as someone who "amongst the Welshmen, best combined the qualities of courage under fire, coolness and shrewdness in leadership with a profound political understanding".

Dobson served with distinction in numerous engagements, including Brunete, Quinto, Belchite, Mediana, Huesca, Teruel, Caspe, and Gandesa. During the retreat from Caspe, he was captured along with British Battalion Commander Sam Wild, but managed to escape by overpowering one of his captors using a tin of bully beef in a sandbag.

== Death and commemoration ==
Dobson was fatally wounded on 28 July 1938 during the Battle of the Ebro, the Republic's final major offensive and the longest and bloodiest battle of the Spanish Civil War. He was taken to an emergency field hospital set up in the Cave of Santa Lucia near La Bisbal de Falset, where Leah Manning of the Spanish Medical Aid Committee was visiting. Manning later recalled that Dobson recognised her from their previous meeting at an anti-fascist rally in South Wales.

Both Manning and Nan Green, another nurse with the Spanish Medical Aid Committee, cared for Dobson during his final hours. Despite receiving a blood transfusion from surgeon Reg Saxton, Dobson died from his wounds on 29 July 1938. Manning sat with him through the night until his death, later writing: "he seemed very happy to have met [me] here". He was buried in the cemetery of La Bisbal de Falset alongside other Republican soldiers.

=== Legacy ===
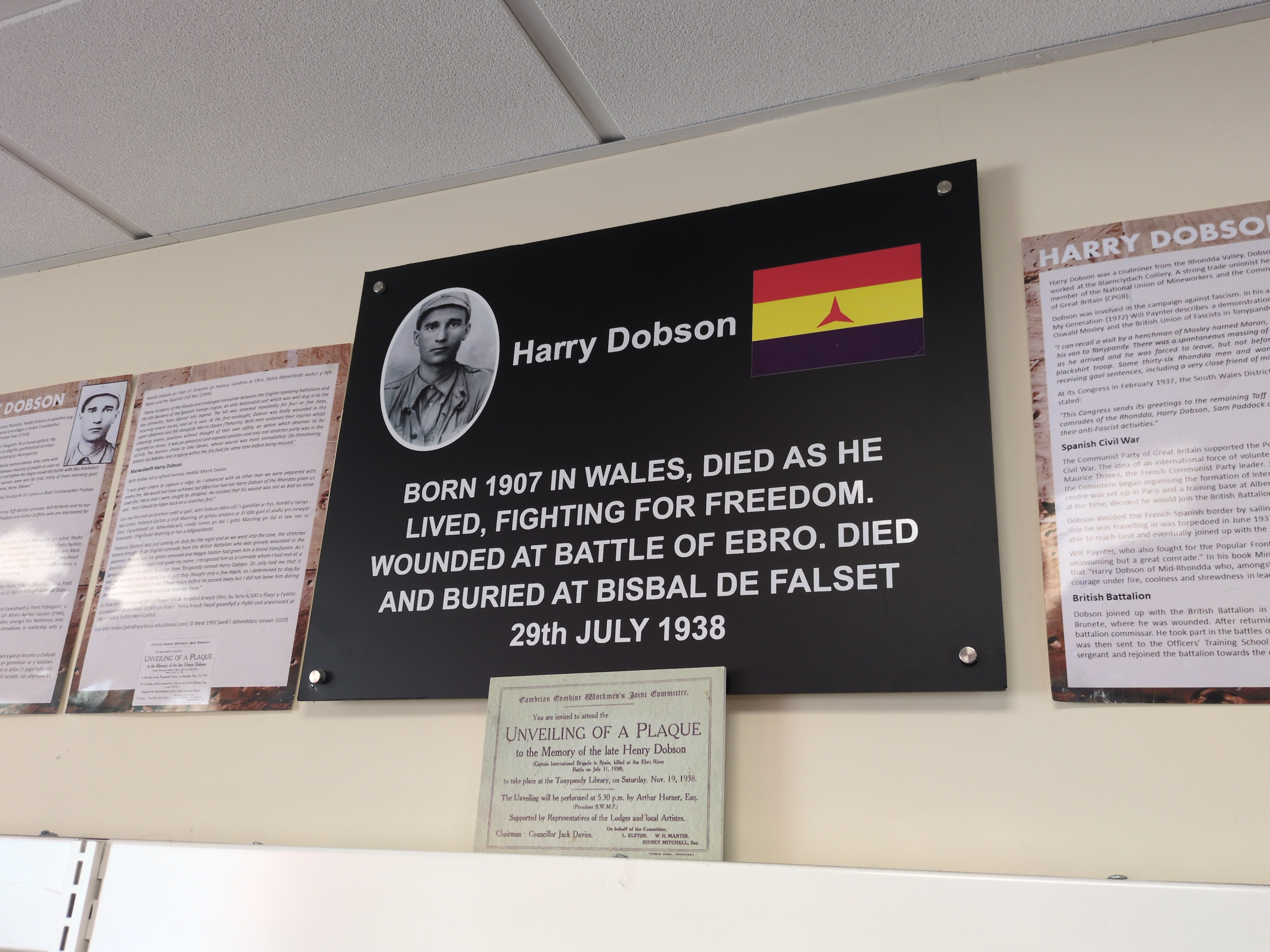
The Harry Dobson Memorial Plaque, in Tonypandy Library

A memorial plaque was erected in Tonypandy Library shortly after Dobson's death, unveiled by Arthur Horner, President of the South Wales Miners' Federation. When the original library was demolished in the 1990s, the plaque was lost, but a replacement was unveiled in November 2023 by his nephew Ray Gleeson.

In September 2023, a memorial plaque was also unveiled at La Bisbal de Falset Cemetery in Spain, near where Dobson is buried, with over 100 people attending the commemoration. The inscription reads: "Died as he lived fighting for Freedom".

Dobson's legacy is closely connected to Arthur Horner, President of the South Wales Miners' Federation and fellow Communist Party member, who spoke at anti-fascist demonstrations alongside Dobson and later unveiled his original memorial plaque. Dobson was one of four participants from the Battle of De Winton Field who later volunteered for the International Brigades, alongside Hector Manning, William Bevan, and William Price. Welsh volunteers represented the largest regional industrial grouping within the British Battalion of the International Brigades.

== See also ==
- Frank Owen (International Brigades)
