= Battle of South Street =

1934 violent confrontation in Worthing, England

- Date: 9 October 1934
- Location: South Street, Worthing, Sussex, United Kingdom
- Caused by: Opposition to Fascist rally in Worthing
- Methods: Assault, protests, property damage
- Result: No further large-scale Fascist marches in Worthing

Parties
British Union of Fascists: Blackshirts	Anti-fascists: Young Socialists

Lead figures
Sir Oswald Mosley; William Joyce	Roy Nicholls

Number
~900	~2000

Casualties
- Arrested: 3

The Battle of South Street was a riot that took place on 9 October 1934 in Worthing, Sussex, England. The riot took place as members of the British Union of Fascists and various anti-fascist protesters clashed following a meeting of Fascists at the Pier Pavilion. The riot involved a series of clashes along and close to the length of South Street from the Pier Pavilion and the Royal Arcade at its southern end to the junctions with Warwick Street and Market Street further north.

== Background ==
Unemployment was high in the 1930s in Worthing and elsewhere in Sussex and England following the Great Depression.

On 31 March 1930, Charles Bentinck Budd was elected to the Offington ward of West Sussex County Council. Later that year, Budd, who lived at Greenville, Grove Road, Worthing, was elected to the town council as the independent representative of Ham Ward in the Broadwater area of the town. In 1933 Oswald Mosley relaunched his 'New Party' as the British Union of Fascists, following a visit to Benito Mussolini in Italy. One of the first branches of the BUF was set up by Budd in Worthing, who attracted a good deal of publicity through various high-profile antics and numerous visits to the town from Mosley and William Joyce. At an election meeting on 16 October 1933, Budd revealed he was now a member of the British Union of Fascists (BUF). Budd was re-elected and the national press reported that Worthing was the first town in the country to elect a fascist councillor. Budd stormed out of Worthing Town Hall when other councillors refused to give him the committee places he desired and attacked the council for refusing to allow the Fascists to hold open-air meetings at the site of the old fish market near Worthing Pier, a privilege that was allowed for the Salvation Army.

One of the BUF's sternest critics locally was Roy Nicholls, chairman of the Young Socialists. At the town's Literary Institution, Nicholls debated with a Blackshirt and led a motion condemning Fascism which was overwhelmingly carried by the audience. According to Hare, many of the people supporting the Fascists were either new to the town or formed part of the town's Italian community, which had existed since the 1880s. John Robert Peryer, a maths teacher at the Worthing High School for Boys, became one of the leaders of the anti-fascist movement in Worthing. With Marion Barber, wife of Worthing's first Labour councillor, Peryer formed the local branch of the International Friendship League.

== Events ==
On the morning of the Fascist rally, the words "No more war. Damn Mosley. Fight Fascism" were written in tar on Worthing Town Hall. Also, tar was spread on the walls of the Fascists' headquarters on Marine Parade. Posters that had been put up to advertise the Fascists' rally bearing the text "Mosley speaks" were defaced to read "Gasbag Mosley speaks tripe".

In the evening, Mosley gave his speech in the Pier Pavilion to a background noise of singing, chanting and fireworks that were let off by opponents outside. The meeting finished around 10pm and Mosley emerged surrounded by his bodyguard of 16 Blackshirts. Mosley underestimated the hostility and size of the crowd, of whom it was estimated there were around 2,000. The Blackshirts marched out of the Pavilion and fireworks were thrown as protesters sang "Poor old Mosley's got the wind up" to the tune of John Brown's Body. Fist fights took place and Mosley took part in the fighting.

The Fascists fought their way to Mitchell's Cafe in the Royal Arcade and barricaded themselves inside as opponents smashed windows and threw tomatoes. As it neared midnight, the Fascists broke out and marched along South Street to the junction with Warwick Street. Followed by anti-fascists, the Fascists ran up South Street to find their route blocked by a hostile group at the junction with Warwick Street. At the time, Warwick Street contained many of the town's more up-market shops and was known locally as "the Bond Street of Worthing". From there, the Fascists continued to the junction with Market Street where there another hostile group lay in wait, leading to a break-out of fighting along Market Street.

One woman bystander was punched in the face in what witnesses described as "guerrilla warfare". There were casualties on both sides as a "seething, struggling mass of howling people" became engaged in running battles. Francis Skilton, a solicitor's clerk from Worthing who had gone to post a letter at the Post Office in Chapel Road and went to see what was happening was "savagely attacked by at least three Blackshirts". A bystander named John Birts carried Skilton to Worthing Hospital, 0.7 miles (1.1 km) away. Robert Poore, an Italian Post Office messenger living in Worthing, was also attacked by the Blackshirts and taken to hospital.

Fighting only ended when a large number of police force arrested three Blackshirts to the cheers of the crowd. The arrested Blackshirts were Mosley, Joyce and a Bernard Mullens, of Chelsea, London.

== Aftermath ==
The three arrested men was later charged with riotous assembly and assault but they were acquitted two days into the trial at Lewes Court of Assizes for lack of evidence. The events ensured that no further large-scale Fascist marches took place in Worthing. Further confrontations with Fascists took place on 5 November 1934. In the days leading up to Bonfire Night a number of anti-fascists were beaten up and Bonfire Night saw some retaliation against the Fascists. At least one Fascist was thrown into the sea and nearly 1,000 people gathered outside the Beach Hotel where it was alleged that a Blackshirt was staying.

== See also ==
- Battle of Lewes Road, an incident in Brighton during the General Strike of 1926.
- Battle of Stockton – an incident between BUF members and anti-fascists in Stockton-on-Tees on 10 September 1933.
- Battle of De Winton Field - a battle between BUF members and anti-fascists in Tonypandy on 11 June 1936.
- Christie Pits riot – a similar incident which took place in Toronto on 16 August 1933.
- 6 February 1934 crisis – a similar event which took place in Paris.
- Battle of Cable Street - A riot in the East End of London in 1936.

== Bibliography ==
- Hann, Dave (2012). Physical Resistance: A Hundred Years of Anti-Fascism. John Hunt Publishing. ISBN 9781780991788.
- Hare, Chris (1991). Historic Worthing: The Untold Story. Cassell Reference. ISBN 9780900075919.
- Payne, Michael (2008). Storm Tide: Worthing: Prelude to War 1933-1939. Verite CM Limited. ISBN 9781904726647.
- West, Rebecca (2010). The New Meaning of Treason. Open Road Media. ISBN 9781453206898.
