= Dobson =

Dobson may refer to:

== People ==
For a listing of people with the surname "Dobson", see Dobson (surname).

== Places ==
- Dobson High School in Arizona, US
- Dobson, Mississippi, a ghost town in Rankin County, Mississippi, US
- Dobson, North Carolina, US
- Mount Dobson, New Zealand
- Dobson, New Zealand

== Things ==
- Dobson (Litigation Guardian of) v. Dobson, [1999] 2 S.C.R. 753 (Supreme Court of Canada decision))
- Dobson Communications
- Dobson Convertiplane, a 1950s experimental aircraft
- Dobson ozone spectrophotometer
- Dobson Pipe Organ Builders, a pipe organ manufacturer based in Iowa
- Dobsonian telescope invented by amateur astronomer John Lowry Dobson
- Dobson unit, a unit of measurement of atmospheric ozone named after British physicist Gordon M. B. Dobson
