= Mark Lane (cricketer, born 1968) =

English cricketer and coach

Personal information
- Full name: Mark Geoffrey Lane
- Born: 26 January 1968 (age 58); Aldershot, Hampshire, England
- Batting: Right-handed
- Role: Wicketkeeper

Domestic team information
- Years: Team
- 1995–2001: Berkshire

Career statistics
Competition	List A
Matches	8
Runs scored	74
Batting average	37.00
100s/50s	0/0
Top score	24*
Catches/stumpings	10/3
- Source: Cricinfo, 21 September 2010

Mark Geoffrey Lane (born 26 January 1968) is a retired English cricketer, who was the head coach of the England women's cricket team between 2008 and 2013.

Lane made six appearances in List A cricket for Berkshire County Cricket Club between 1996 and 2001, scoring 74 runs and claiming 13 dismissals as wicket-keeper. He also played for Hampshire and Surrey's second elevens, before becoming a coach with Surrey.

He became coach of the England women's team on 16 April 2008, following the sudden resignation of Mark Dobson midway through a tour of Australia and New Zealand. He coached England to victories in both the 2009 World Cup and Twenty/20 Championship.
