= Tonypandy Town Hall =

Building in Tonypandy, Wales

- Neuadd y Dref Tonypandy (Welsh)
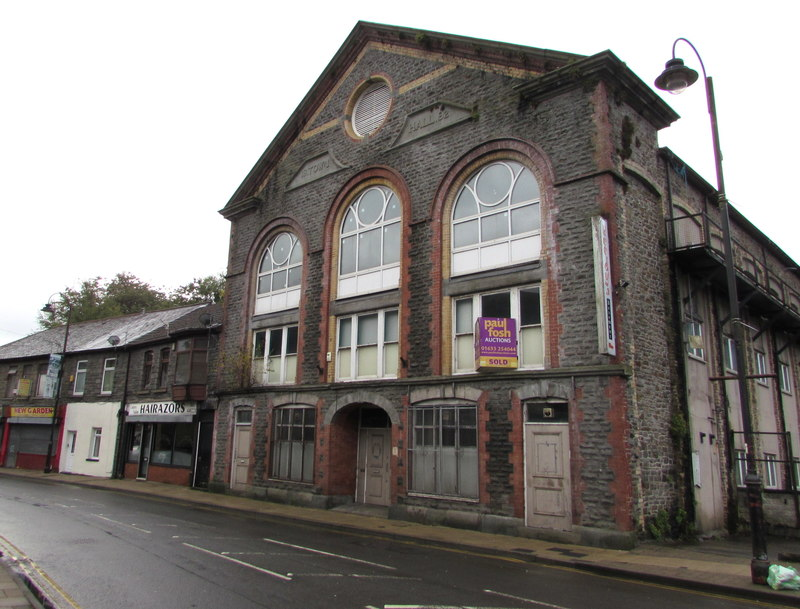
- The building in September 2017

- Shown in Rhondda Cynon Taf
- 51.6237°N 3.4569°W
- Location: De Winton Street, Tonypandy

History
- Built: 1892

Site notes
- Architectural style: Neoclassical style

Tonypandy Town Hall (Welsh: Neuadd y Dref Tonypandy) is a building located on De Winton Street in Tonypandy in Rhondda Cynon Taf in Wales. The structure is currently in residential use as private flats.

== History ==
The building was commissioned by a group of local businessmen for use as a theatre. The site they selected was a small valley in which the Clydach brook flowed underground through a culvert, just to the west of the point at which it flowed into the River Rhondda Fawr.

The building was designed in the neoclassical style, built in rubble masonry and was officially opened as the Theatre Royal in 1892. The design involved a symmetrical main frontage of three bays facing onto De Winton Street. The central bay contained a segmental headed opening with voussoirs and a keystone flanked by a pair of segmental headed casement windows and, beyond that, two doorways. The first floor was fenestrated by three square headed casement windows and the second floor was fenestrated by three round headed casement windows, all framed by three arches spanning the first and second floors. The building was surmounted by an open pediment with an oculus in the tympanum. Below the oculus, there was a pair of plaques inscribed "18 Town Hall 92", suggesting the building was used as a public meeting place from an early stage. Internally, the principal room was the main auditorium, which featured a proscenium arch.

The theatre was popular at the turn of the 20th century, and one of the performers was the comic actor, Charlie Chaplin, in 1901. In the wake of the Tonypandy riots in November 1910, a public meeting was held in the building at which a socialist speaker, Harry Quelch, spoke of his support for the striking miners.

In 1912, the building was remodelled to serve as a cinema, operated by Sam Duckworth and W. E. Willis. The conversion work involved the installation of new staircases. It closed in 1918, but reopened in 1922 under new ownership, closing in 1959. By 1966, the building remained vacant and disused, and was being offered for sale.

The building was then converted for multiple use with council offices on the ground and first floors, a snooker club on the second floor, and a nightclub in the basement. By 1992, a restaurant, the Shenshaw Tandoori, had been established on part of the ground floor, and, by 2010, the snooker club had closed, but the building contained a shopping arcade with a variety of small retail units. In 2016, the building was converted into 18 flats and five shops.
