= Paul Dobson =

Paul Dobson may refer to:

- Paul Dobson (footballer) (1962–2026), English footballer
- Paul Dobson (actor) (born 1963), British-born Canadian voice actor
- Paul Dobson (British Army soldier), British soldier, first NCO to be awarded the Military Cross
- Paul Dobson (curler) (born 1979), Canadian curler
