= St Andrew's High School, Worthing =

St Andrew's CE High School

Location
- Sackville Road; Worthing, West Sussex, BN14 8BG; England; 50°49′20″N 0°22′02″W

Information
- Type: Voluntary aided school
- Motto: "Nihil Sine Labore"
- Religious affiliation: Church of England
- Established: 1897
- Local authority: West Sussex
- Department for Education URN: 126094 Tables
- Ofsted: Reports
- Chair of Governors: Clive Purser
- Headteacher: Mia Lowney
- Gender: Mixed
- Age: 11 to 16
- Enrolment: 854
- Houses: Andrew's Patrick's David's George's
- Colours: Blue and Black
- Website: https://www.sta-worthing.com/

St Andrew's High School is located in Worthing, West Sussex, catchment area. It was founded in 1897.

The school was judged to Require Improvement by Ofsted in 2013. In 2015 it was judged Good. In 2018 it was again judged to Require Improvement. In 2022 it was judged Inadequate. In 2023 it was judged Good.

In January 2021, Mia Lowney became the headmistress. In July 2020 West Sussex County Council announced proposals to alter St Andrew's from a single sex boys’ school to a co-educational school from September 2021 entry. Also in 2020, Louise Welcome resigned.
