= Paul Dobson (British Army soldier) =

British Army Soldier

Paul Steven Dobson MC was the first member of the British Armed Forces below Warrant Officer rank to be awarded the Military Cross after the abolition of the Military Medal in 1993 and the extension of the Military Cross to all ranks.

Dobson was a corporal in the 1st Battalion, Prince of Wales's Own Regiment of Yorkshire when he was honoured in 1994 for his service in Bosnia in 1993. He acted as a human shield while Bosnian civilians were being evacuated from a burning apartment block under sniper fire.
