= John Dobson (Canadian politician) =

Canadian politician

John Dobson (8 September 1824 – 27 January 1907) was a Conservative member of the Senate of Canada from 23 February 1892 until his death.

Born in County Fermanagh, Ireland, the son of John Dobson and Mary Henry, he was educated at the Public Schools. After residing in Toronto for a few years he moved to Lindsay, Ontario. He was elected Mayor of Lindsay by acclamation in 1873, and also to the office of President of the Board of Trade. He was President of the South Victoria Agricultural Society and Chairman of the School Board. He was also President of the South Victoria Conservative Association for over 25 years. A Conservative, he was called to the Senate on the advice of John Joseph Caldwell Abbott on February 23, 1892 and represented the senatorial division of Lindsay, Ontario for almost 15 years until his death.
