= Michael Dobson =

Michael Dobson may refer to:

- Michael Dobson (author) (born 1952), American author
- Michael Dobson (businessman) (born 1952), British businessman, chairman of Schroders
- Michael Dobson (actor) (born 1966), Canadian voice actor
- Michael Dobson (footballer) (born 1981), English footballer
- Michael Dobson (rugby league) (born 1986), Australian rugby league player
