= Dobson Convertiplane =

1950s American experimental VTOL aircraft

Convertiplane
- Franklin Dobson standing next to his Convertiplane

General information
- Type: Experimental VTOL aircraft
- National origin: American
- Manufacturer: Franklin A. Dobson
- Number built: 1
- Registration: N89P

History
- Introduction date: 1956

The Dobson Convertiplane was a tiltrotor VTOL convertiplane, designed and built by Franklin A. Dobson in the 1950s.

== Design and development ==
Dobson, an aeronautical engineer employed by North American Aviation, and based in Whittier, California, developed the aircraft as a private venture. He was aided by Hiram Sibley and by John Guthrie, both fellow employees at North American.

The Convertiplane was a twin-engined high-wing delta monoplane. Both engines powered two three-bladed contra-rotating tractor propellers which could be pivoted between the horizontal and the vertical. The aircraft had a steel tube framework and was covered in canvas. The delta wing incorporated elevons into its trailing edge. Two small fins were positioned at each wingtip. There was a centrally located all-moving rudder positioned above the wing at the rear of the fuselage. The two crew sat on a bench seat at the front of the fuselage. There was a fixed conventional undercarriage.

Dobson had wanted to create something appropriate for the private aircraft owner to operate, and which was also safe and easy to operate. It was intended that the Convertiplane would take off in the same way as a helicopter. The pitch of the outboard sections of each propeller blade could be controlled by the pilot, enabling the craft to have both collective and cyclic pitch control. After takeoff, the propellers would pivot forward, so that the aircraft would then operate like a conventional aircraft. During the landing phase of a flight, the propellers would pivot vertically, with Dobson anticipating that the Convertiplane would land at speeds of around 20 mph (32 km/h).

Dobson and Sibley submitted a patent application for a "Convertiplane" in 1954, with Patent No. 2,994,492 being granted on August 1, 1961. The Convertiplane was given the FAA registration N89P in 1956, with that being kept active till 1977, before being deregistered in 2011.

== Operational history ==
Documentary film footage shows the Convertiplane from concept through to its completion. The film includes a scene showing a partially completed Convertiplane in a test rig lifting off the ground, as well as footage of a helicopter equipped with the contra-rotating propellers making tethered flights. It is not known if the completed aircraft flew.

== Specifications ==
Data from Aviation Week

General characteristics

- Crew: 1
- Capacity: 1
- Length: 13 ft 9 in (4.19 m)
- Wingspan: 15 ft (4.6 m)
- Height: 6 ft 3 in (1.91 m)
- Wing area: 112.50 sq ft (10.452 m^{2})
- Aspect ratio: 2.0
- Empty weight: 660 lb (299 kg)
- Gross weight: 1,100 lb (499 kg)
- Powerplant: 2 × McCulloch 4318 flat-four, 70 hp (52 kW) each
- Propellers: 3-bladed, 16 ft (4.9 m) diameter

Performance

- Maximum speed: 187 mph (301 km/h, 162 kn)
- Cruise speed: 172 mph (277 km/h, 149 kn)
- Stall speed: 20 mph (32 km/h, 17 kn)
- Wing loading: 9.78 lb/sq ft (47.8 kg/m^{2})

== See also ==
Aircraft of comparable role, configuration, and era

- Baldwin Mono Tiltrotor
- Bell XV-3
- Transcendental Model 1-G
