= Mark Dobson =

English cricketer

Personal information
- Full name: Mark Christopher Dobson
- Born: 24 October 1967 (age 59); Canterbury, Kent
- Nickname: Dobbo, Jack
- Height: 5 ft 10 in (1.78 m)
- Batting: Right-handed
- Bowling: Slow left-arm orthodox

Domestic team information
- Years: Team
- 1989–1991: Kent
- 1992: Glamorgan

Career statistics
Competition	First-class	List A
Matches	10	1
Runs scored	2,118	21
Batting average	17.58	21.00
100s/50s	0/2	0/0
Top score	52	21
Balls bowled	886	–
Wickets	9	–
Bowling average	54.00	–
5 wickets in innings	0	–
10 wickets in match	0	–
Best bowling	2/20	–
Catches/stumpings	2/–	1/–
- Source: CricInfo, 4 July 2010

Mark Christopher Dobson (born 24 October 1967) is a former English professional cricketer. Dobson was a right-handed batsman who bowled slow left-arm orthodox. He was born at Canterbury in Kent.

== Cricket career ==
Dobson made his first-class cricket debut for Kent County Cricket Club against Essex in July 1989. He had made his Second XI debut for the county in 1983 and played regularly for the reserve team from 1986 to 1991. From 1989 to 1991, he played nine first-class matches for Kent, with his final match for the county coming against Oxford University in June 1991. Dobson also played a single List-A cricket match for Kent in July 1989 against Gloucestershire.

After leaving Kent, he played one further first-class match in June 1992 for Glamorgan against Oxford University. In his 10 first-class matches he scored 211 runs at a batting average of 17.58, with two half centuries and a top score of 52. He took nine wickets with best figures of 2/20.

== Later career ==
Dobson has a First Class degree in Sports Science and was Head of PE at St Edmund's School in Canterbury between 1995 and 2007. He had coached the Kent Academy and the Emeralds women's cricket team before resigning as a teacher in 2007 to take up the post of head coach of the England women's cricket team. He unexpectedly resigned from the role in February 2008 part way through England's tour of Australia and New Zealand citing personal reasons.

Having played football for Tyler Hill, Broomfield and Herne Bay, Dobson became head coach of Canterbury City F.C. in 2008. He later coached at Sussex House School before leaving in 2024
