= Tonypandy =

Town in Rhondda Cynon Taf, Wales

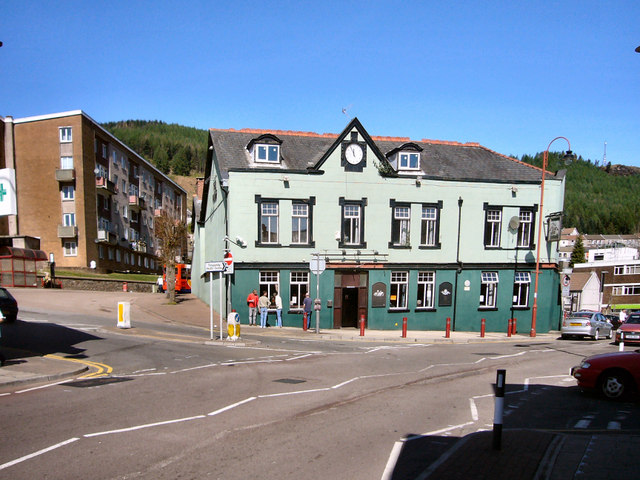
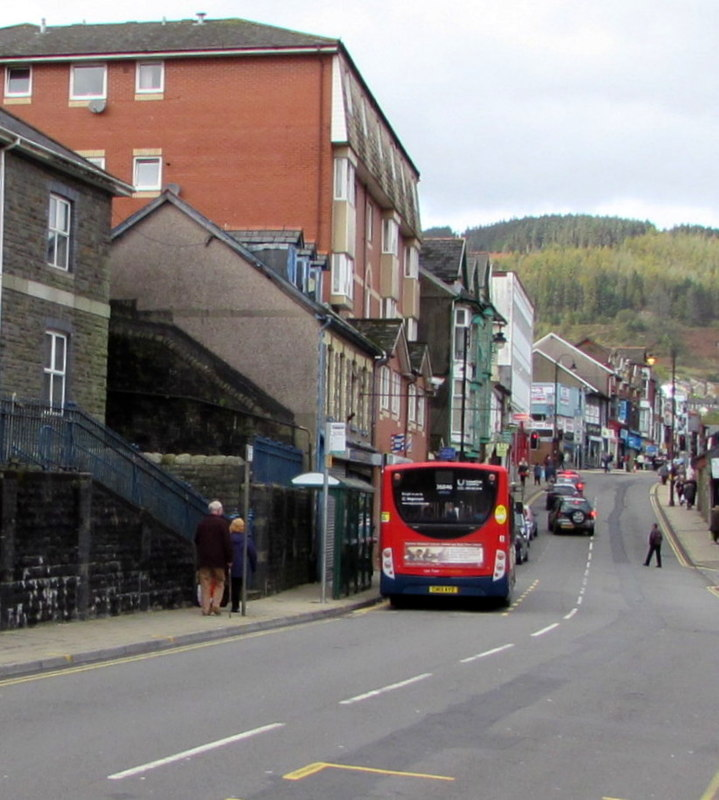
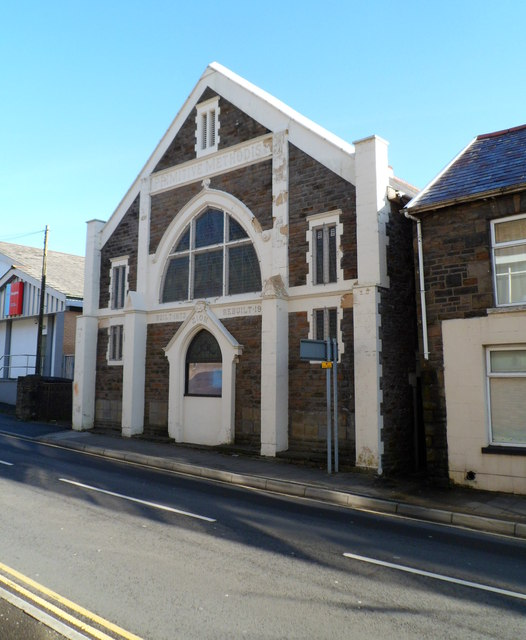
- From the top, Tonypandy town square, Dunraven Street, Tonypandy Methodist Church

- Location within Rhondda Cynon Taf
- Population: 3,560 https://www.nomisweb.co.uk/sources/census_2021/report
- OS grid reference: SS995925
- Principal area: Rhondda Cynon Taf
- Preserved county: Mid Glamorgan
- Country: Wales
- Sovereign state: United Kingdom
- Post town: TONYPANDY
- Postcode district: CF40
- Dialling code: 01443
- Police: South Wales
- Fire: South Wales
- Ambulance: Welsh
- UK Parliament: Rhondda and Ogmore
- Senedd Cymru – Welsh Parliament: Rhondda
- List of places UK Wales Rhondda Cynon Taf 51.6223°N 3.4512°W Community map: Map of the community

Tonypandy (/tɒnəˈpændi/, Welsh pronunciation: [tɔnəˈpandi]) is a town, community and electoral ward located in the county borough of Rhondda Cynon Taf, within the historic county boundaries of Glamorgan, Wales, lying in the Rhondda Fawr Valley. A former industrial coal mining town, the town was the scene of the 1910 Tonypandy riots.

The community boundaries of Tonypandy are drawn relatively tightly around the central part of the urban area. According to the 2011 UK Census, the population of the community was 3,750. The Office for National Statistics defines a larger "Tonypandy built-up area" covering much of the Rhondda Fawr valley and the lower Rhondda Fach valley, which had a population of 62,545 in 2011. They also define a smaller "Tonypandy built-up area sub division" which had a population of 17,789.

The town is served by Tonypandy railway station on the Rhondda Line.

== Toponymy ==
Tonypandy means fulling mill lea, from Welsh ton (archaic tonnau) for lea, layland, pasture, grassland or unploughed land; pannu for fulling and tŷ for house (cf. pandy). (See also Tonna.)

== History ==
=== Pre-industrial ===
The Tonypandy area contains several prehistoric sites, the main one being Mynydd y Gelli. Located to the north-west of the town, the remains of an Iron Age settlement Hen Dre'r Gelli lies on the slopes of Mynydd Y Gelli hill between Tonypandy and Gelli. Near the same location are several Bronze Age cairns.

Tonypandy is also the site of one of two permanent Middle Ages fortifications found within the Rhondda Valley. Named Ynysygrug, it was a lesser motte and bailey earthwork defence consisting of a wooden tower surrounded by a small fortified courtyard. Built around the 12th or early 13th century, the remains of the fortification were mostly destroyed during railway construction works in the 19th century. The fortification was for many years wrongly thought to be the burial place of Rhys ap Tewdwr or a druidic worship site.

The regional library service recounts that the name 'Tonypandy' means the meadow of the fulling mill which was established there in 1838. "E. D. Lewis in his work The Rhondda Valleys provides us with an outline history of the mill that once stood in Tonypandy, and from which the town took its name".

=== Industrial era ===
In the mid-19th century, the Rhondda began its industrial transformation after the successful excavation of coal. With the extension of the Taff Vale Railway to Treherbert and Maerdy in 1856, the Rhondda grew as absentee landlords switched their interests from farming to mining.

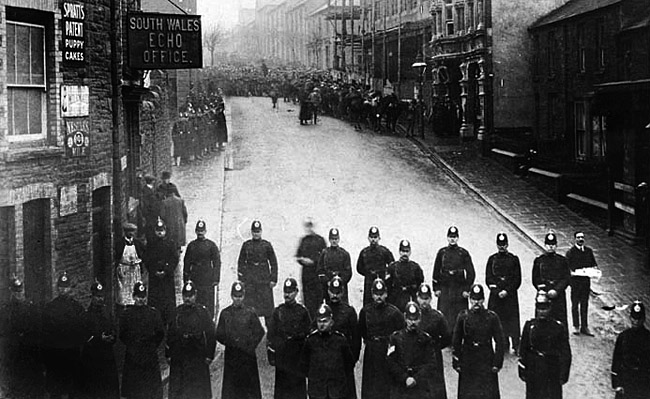
Police officers blocking a street during the Tonypandy Riots

The Tonypandy riots of 1910 and 1911 were a series of violent confrontations between coal miners and police that took place at various locations in and around the Rhondda mines of the Cambrian Combine, a cartel of mining companies in South Wales. The riots began when miners at the Ely Pit refused to accept lower wages and the Combine began importing strikebreakers. Home Secretary Winston Churchill controversially deployed military forces including cavalry and infantry to support police. Though the closest any troops came to Tonypandy was Cardiff, and they played no part in quelling the riots, which resulted in over 500 injuries. The events led to lasting bitterness towards Churchill in South Wales and significant radicalisation within the Welsh labour movement.

In 1936, Tonypandy was the site of the Battle of De Winton Field, a significant anti-fascist confrontation that took place on 11 June when Tommy Moran, propaganda officer for the British Union of Fascists, attempted to hold a rally in the town. Between 5,000 and 6,000 anti-fascist demonstrators, comprising local miners, socialists, communists, and trade unionists, mobilised to prevent the fascist meeting. After sustained opposition, the BUF was forced to abandon their rally after just thirty minutes, marking their final attempt to establish a presence in Wales.

Tonypandy, unlike the surrounding villages, then grew as a financial and social hub, providing services and amenities for the neighbouring communities.

== Sports and recreation ==
In the early part of the 20th century, Tonypandy was home to Mid-Rhondda RLFC, one of the first Welsh rugby league teams. Although surviving only one season, the club transformed into Mid-Rhondda AFC, one of the most notable association football teams the Rhondda has produced. Both Mid-Rhondda teams played at the Athletic Ground, now known as "the Mid" . The pitch is notable as having hosted the first international match between the Wales and England rugby league teams on 20 April 1908. It was also used as the opening venue for the 1908–09 Kangaroo tour of Great Britain, when the visiting Australian rugby league team began its campaign with a match against Mid-Rhondda.

When the Mid-Rhondda RLFC collapsed in 1909, the committee refocused on creating an association football team. In 1912 Mid Rhondda F.C. was formed, winning the South League Second Division in 1919–20.

== Governance ==
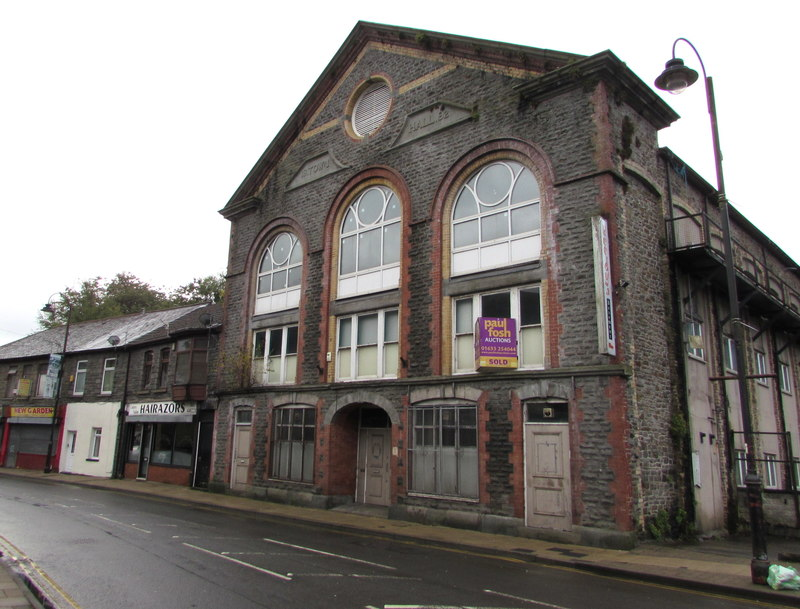
The former Tonypandy Town Hall

In 1988 Tonypandy became a county electoral ward to Mid Glamorgan County Council, electing one county councillor in 1989 and 1993. Tonypandy Town Hall was erected as a theatre in 1892.

Since 1995 Tonypandy has been a ward, coterminous with the community boundaries, which elects a county borough councillor to Rhondda Cynon Taf County Borough Council. In 2012 the electorate was 2,739.

At every Rhondda Cynon Taf election the seat has been won by the Labour Party, apart from the 1999 election when then ward was won by Plaid Cymru. Between 2004 and 2017 the Labour councillor was Craig Middle and, since May 2017, the councillor has been Gareth Wyn Hughes.

== Notable people ==
See Category:People from Tonypandy

- Willie Llewellyn (1878 – 1973), Welsh national rugby captain and three times Triple Crown winner
- Writer Rhys Davies (1901 – 1978)
- George Thomas, 1st Viscount Tonypandy (1909 – 1997) was educated at Tonypandy Grammar School.
- Boxer Tommy Farr (1913 – 1986), the "Tonypandy Terror", trained there, living in adjoining Clydach Vale
- Brothers Donald Houston (1923 – 1991) and Glyn Houston (1926 - 2019) were both actors
- Len Rawle (b. 1938), organist and organ builder/restorer
- Harry Dobson (1907 – 1938), coal miner, anti-fascist activist and International Brigades volunteer killed in the Spanish Civil War
- Footballer and club manager Nathan Jones (b. 1973)
- Footballer Alex Lawless (b. 1985)
- Singer and actress Sophie Evans (b. 1993)
- Stuart Richardson (b. 1973) Former bassist of Lostprophets and current bassist for No Devotion
