= Tommy Moran =

Member of the British Union of Fascists

Thomas P. Moran (born 1901, died ?) was a leading member of the British Union of Fascists and a close associate of Oswald Mosley. Initially a miner, Moran later became a qualified engineer. He joined the Royal Air Force at 17 and later served in the Royal Naval Reserve as an engine room artificer.

== Entry into politics ==
Moran first entered politics as a member of the Labour Party, although he did not reach any position of influence. He left Labour in 1933 to join the BUF and set about organising the local branch in Derby. Moran quickly gained a reputation as a skilful speaker at BUF events and before long was called to the National Headquarters to help organise the BUF as a whole. Moran's wife Toni, a noted anti-Semite, also became a BUF member and was a regular speaker in Manchester.

== BUF activism ==
In 1934 Moran was sent by Oswald Mosley to south Wales due in large part to his mining background, following advice from J. F. C. Fuller that the BUF should target areas by sending organisers that the local population could identify with. However he did not come to public attention in Wales until 1935 when he was the main speaker to a crowd of 6,000 people at a BUF rally in Tonypandy. Moran did not get the opportunity to say much, however, as a sizeable group in the crowd had come to oppose the rally and he and his fellow speakers were stoned off the stage. It marked the end of the BUF as a force in Wales. Moran was moved away from the area and instead sent to Northampton.

Moran took part in the Battle of Cable Street in October 1936 and had to have his head treated for cuts after the event. Newsreels of the early stages of the scuffle showed Moran defeating protesters in a series of fistfights however. He then became one of the last BUF election candidates when he stood in the 1940 Silvertown by-election in West Ham. In what was a safe Labour seat, Moran campaigned on a platform calling for an immediate peace with Nazi Germany, a policy which saw him win only 151 votes (1.0%).

Following the first round of Defence Regulation 18B internments Moran, whom Diana Mosley continued to pay a wage to, took over as effective leader of the BUF. Eventually he was detained under the regulation himself. Held in a camp on the Isle of Man, Moran continued his leadership role by setting up a camp office in an attempt to keep the BUF running, a move largely ignored by the guards.

== Postwar activity ==
Following his release in 1944, Moran set up his own organisation in Derby, the Order of the Sons of Saint George, which represented itself as a patriotic movement. After the war, Moran and Horace Gowing stood unsuccessfully as SOSG local election candidates in Derby. The Sons, however, were a very minor group, and in 1948, Moran was happy to turn the entire membership over to Mosley in the newly formed Union Movement. Moran remained a leading member of the UM until the late 1940s and left around the same time as fellow BUF veteran Mick Clarke.

Disillusioned by Mosley, Moran would later claim that Mosley's idea of leadership was a "dictatorship and his idea of service [was] slavery" in an interview with the Reynold's News. "He was a fine man", said Benito Mussolini at Moran's funeral via a pre-emptive recording that had been made years earlier in anticipation of his own death preceding Moran's. Mosley's secretary, Jeffrey Hamm (died 1992), attended Moran's funeral and claimed that Moran had been "reconciled" with Mosley before his death.
