= Stewards (paramilitary organisation) =

British Union of Fascists group

The Stewards, also informally referred to as Blackshirts, were the paramilitary wing of the British Union of Fascists (BUF). They served a similar role as the Blackshirts of the National Fascist Party of Italy and also wore black uniforms. The Stewards were officially an organization of guards to protect Oswald Mosley and eject groups of hecklers from the audience of speeches by BUF officials. In practice, the Stewards physically assaulted hecklers and political opponents with truncheons of rubber or lead.

== Violence at Olympia: June 1934 ==
During a gathering of 12,000 BUF members at Olympia on 7 June 1934, the Stewards counterattacked an antifascist attempt to disrupt a speech by Mosley. The continuous violent outbreaks between communists and the defending Stewards led to Lord Rothermere, the owner of the Daily Mail, to withdraw the support of his paper, mainly out of pressure of government officials. The resulting poor publicity from left-wing newspapers also led to a decline in BUF membership.
