= British Union of Fascists =

1932–1940 political party

- Flash and circle
- Leader: Oswald Mosley
- Founded: 1 October 1932; 94 years ago
- Dissolved: 10 July 1940; 86 years ago
- Country: United Kingdom
- Groups: January Club; Stewards; Fascist Defence Force
- Headquarters: London, England
- Newspaper: Action (1936–40); The Blackshirt (1933–36)
- Ideology: British fascism: Monarchism; British nationalism; National syndicalism; Corporate statism; Non-interventionism; Antisemitism
- Political position: Far-right
- Anthem: "Comrades, the Voices"
- Size: 40,000 (1934 est.)

The British Union of Fascists (BUF) was a British fascist political party formed in 1932 by Oswald Mosley. In 1937 it changed its name to the British Union. In 1939, following the start of the Second World War, the party was proscribed by the British government and in 1940 it was disbanded.

The BUF emerged in 1932 from the electoral defeat of its antecedent, the New Party, in the 1931 general election. The BUF's foundation was initially met with popular support, and it attracted a sizeable following, with the party claiming 50,000 members at one point. The press baron Lord Rothermere was a notable early supporter. As the party became increasingly radical, however, support declined. The Olympia Rally of 1934, in which a number of anti-fascist protestors were attacked by the paramilitary wing of the BUF, the Fascist Defence Force, isolated the party from much of its following. The party's embrace of Nazi-style antisemitism in 1936 led to increasingly violent confrontations with anti-fascists, notably the 1936 Battle of Cable Street in London's East End. The Public Order Act 1936, which banned political uniforms and responded to increasing political violence, had a particularly strong effect on the BUF whose supporters were known as "Blackshirts" after the uniforms they wore.

Growing British hostility towards Nazi Germany, with which the British press persistently associated the BUF, further contributed to the decline of the movement's membership. The party was finally banned by the British government on 23 May 1940 after the start of the Second World War, amid suspicion that its remaining supporters might form a pro-Nazi "fifth column". A number of prominent BUF members were arrested and interned under Defence Regulation 18B.

== History ==
=== Background ===
Flowchart showing the history of the early British fascist movement

Oswald Mosley was the youngest elected Conservative MP before crossing the floor in 1922, joining first Labour and, shortly afterward, the Independent Labour Party. He became Chancellor of the Duchy of Lancaster in Ramsay MacDonald's Labour government, advising on rising unemployment.

In 1930, Mosley issued his Mosley Memorandum, which fused protectionism with a proto-Keynesian programme of policies designed to tackle the problem of unemployment, and he resigned from the Labour Party soon after, in early 1931, when the plans were rejected. He immediately formed the New Party, with policies based on his memorandum. The party won 16% of the vote at a by-election in Ashton-under-Lyne in early 1931; however, it failed to achieve any other electoral success.

During 1931, the New Party became increasingly influenced by fascism. The following year, after a January 1932 visit to Benito Mussolini in Italy, Mosley's own conversion to fascism was confirmed. He wound up the New Party in April, but preserved its youth movement, which would form the core of the BUF, intact. He spent the summer that year writing a fascist programme, The Greater Britain, and this formed the basis of policy of the BUF, which was launched on 1 October 1932 at 12 Great George Street in London.

=== Early success and growth ===
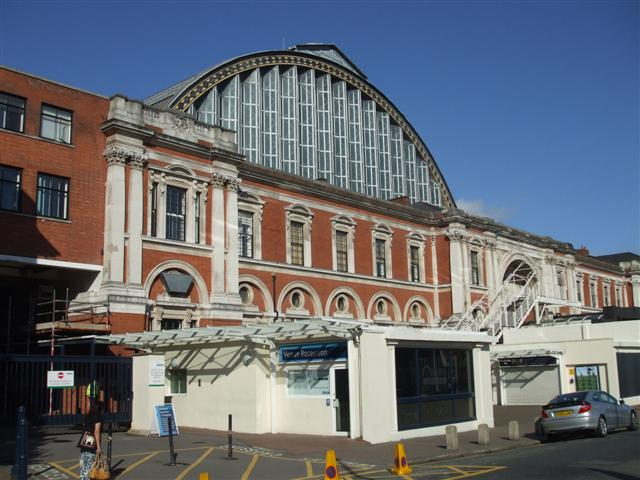
The Olympia Exhibition Centre in London, site of the party's 1934 rally sometimes cited as the beginning of the movement's decline

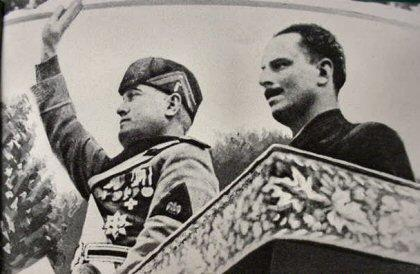
Italy's Duce Benito Mussolini (left) with BUF leader Oswald Mosley (right) during Mosley's visit to Italy in April 1933

The BUF claimed 50,000 members at one point, and the Daily Mail, running the headline "Hurrah for the Blackshirts!", was an early supporter. The first Director of Propaganda, appointed in February 1933, was Wilfred Risdon, who was responsible for organising all of Mosley's public meetings. Despite strong resistance from anti-fascists, including the local Jewish community, the Labour Party, the Independent Labour Party and the Communist Party of Great Britain, the BUF found a following in the East End of London, where in the London County Council elections of March 1937, it obtained reasonably successful results in Bethnal Green, Shoreditch and Limehouse, polling almost 8,000 votes, although none of its candidates was elected. The BUF did elect a few councillors at local government level during the 1930s (including Charles Bentinck Budd (Worthing, Sussex), 1934; Ronald Creasy (Eye, Suffolk), 1938) but did not win any parliamentary seats. Two former members of the BUF, Major Sir Jocelyn Lucas and Harold Soref, were later elected as Conservative Members of Parliament (MPs).

Having lost the funding of newspaper magnate Lord Rothermere, that it had previously enjoyed, at the 1935 general election the party urged voters to abstain, calling for "Fascism Next Time". There never was a "next time" as the next general election was not held until July 1945, five years after the dissolution of the BUF.

Towards the middle of the 1930s, the BUF's violent clashes with opponents began to alienate some middle-class supporters, and membership decreased. At the Olympia rally in London, in 1934, BUF stewards violently ejected anti-fascist disrupters, and this led the Daily Mail to withdraw its support for the movement. The level of violence shown at the rally shocked many, with the effect of turning neutral parties against the BUF and contributing to anti-fascist support. One observer claimed: "I came to the conclusion that Mosley was a political maniac, and that all decent English people must combine to kill his movement."

In Belfast in April 1934 an autonomous wing of the party in Northern Ireland called the "Ulster Fascists" was founded. The branch was a failure and became virtually extinct after less than a year in existence. It had ties with the Blueshirts in the Irish Free State and voiced support for a United Ireland, describing the partition of Ireland as "an insurmountable barrier to peace, and prosperity in Ireland". Its logo combined the fasces with the Red Hand of Ulster.

=== Decline and legacy ===
The BUF became more antisemitic over 1934–35 owing to the growing influence of Nazi sympathisers within the party, such as William Joyce and John Beckett, which provoked the resignation of members such as Robert Forgan. This antisemitic emphasis and these high-profile resignations resulted in a significant decline in membership, dropping to below 8,000 by the end of 1935, and, ultimately, Mosley shifted the party's focus back to mainstream politics. There were frequent and continuous violent clashes between BUF party members and anti-fascist protesters organised by member of the Independent Labour Party, Communist Party and the Trade Union Movement, including supporters of these groups within the Jewish Community; most famously at the Battle of Cable Street in October 1936, when organised anti-fascists prevented the BUF from marching through Cable Street. However, the party later staged other marches through the East End without incident, albeit not on Cable Street itself.

BUF support for Edward VIII and the peace campaign to prevent a second World War saw membership and public support rise once more. The government was sufficiently concerned by the party's growing prominence to pass the Public Order Act 1936, which banned political uniforms and required police consent for political marches.

In 1937, William Joyce and other Nazi sympathisers split from the party to form the National Socialist League, which quickly folded, with most of its members interned. Mosley later denounced Joyce as a traitor and condemned him for his extreme antisemitism. The historian Stephen Dorril revealed in his book Blackshirts that secret envoys from the Nazis had donated about £50,000 to the BUF.

By 1939, total BUF membership had declined to just 20,000, and an active membership of only 5,800, more than half of which was in Greater London. After March 1938, when the Czechoslovak Crisis brought Britain and Nazi Germany close to war, the BUF profited by re-orientating to a primarily anti-war campaign, something bolstered in 1939 by the German annexation of Bohemia and Britain's guarantee of Poland. The campaign was steeped in antisemitism, with Mosley blaming rising tensions as well as the British-Polish pact on 'Jewish finance'. At the peak of this campaign, Mosley was able to address an audience 11,000 strong at Exhibition Hall, Earls Court, on 16 July.

The BUF's anti-war campaign did not cease after the outbreak of war between Britain and Germany, so, on 23 May 1940, Mosley and some 740 other party members were interned under Defence Regulation 18B. The BUF then called on its followers to resist invasion, but it was declared unlawful on 10 July 1940 and ceased its activities.

After the war, Mosley made several unsuccessful attempts to return to political life, one such being through the Union Movement, but he had no successes.

== Relationship with the suffragettes ==
Attracted by "modern" fascist policies, such as ending the widespread practice of sacking women from their jobs on marriage, many women joined the Blackshirts – particularly in economically depressed Lancashire. Eventually women constituted one-quarter of the BUF's membership.

In a January 2010 BBC documentary, Mother Was A Blackshirt, James Maw reported that in 1914 Norah Elam was placed in a Holloway Prison cell with Emmeline Pankhurst for her involvement with the suffragette movement, and, in 1940, she was returned to the same prison with Diana Mosley, this time for her involvement with the fascist movement. Another leading suffragette, Mary Richardson, became head of the women's section of the BUF.

Mary Sophia Allen OBE was a former branch leader of the West of England Women's Social and Political Union (WSPU). At the outbreak of the First World War, she joined the Women Police Volunteers, becoming the WPV Commandant in 1920. She met Mosley at the January Club in April 1932, going on to speak at the club following her visit to Germany, "to learn the truth about the position of German womanhood".

The BBC report described how Elam's fascist philosophy grew from her suffragette experiences, how the British fascist movement became largely driven by women, how they targeted young women from an early age, how the first British fascist movement was founded by a woman, and how the leading lights of the suffragettes had, with Oswald Mosley, founded the BUF.

Mosley's electoral strategy had been to prepare for the election after 1935, and in 1936, he announced a list of BUF candidates for that election, with Elam nominated to stand for Northampton. Mosley accompanied Elam to Northampton to introduce her to her electorate at a meeting in the Town Hall. At that meeting Mosley announced that "he was glad indeed to have the opportunity of introducing the first candidate, and ... [thereby] killed for all time the suggestion that National Socialism proposed putting British women back into the home; this is simply not true. Mrs Elam [he went on] had fought in the past for women's suffrage ... and was a great example of the emancipation of women in Britain."

Former suffragettes were drawn to the BUF for a variety of reasons. Many felt that the movement's energy reminded them of the suffragettes, while others felt that the BUF's economic policies would offer them true equality – unlike its continental counterparts, the movement insisted that it would not require women to return to domesticity and it also insisted that the corporatist state would ensure adequate representation for housewives, while it would also guarantee equal wages for women and remove the marriage bar that restricted the employment of married women. The BUF also offered support for new mothers (due to concerns about falling birth rates), and it also offered effective birth control, because Mosley believed that it was not in the national interest to have a populace which lacked modern scientific knowledge. While these policies were motivated more out of making the best use of women's skills in state interest than they were motivated by any kind of feminism, it was still a draw for many suffragettes.

== Prominent members and supporters ==
Despite the short period of its operation, the BUF attracted prominent members and supporters. These included:

- Mary Sophia Allen was a suffragette.
- William Edward David Allen was previously a Unionist Member of Parliament for Belfast West. Material in the National Archive shows that Allen acted as an MI5 agent within the BUF.
- John Beckett was previously a Labour Member of Parliament for Peckham.
- Frank Bossard was an officer in the RAF and, after the war, he was a Soviet spy.
- Patrick Boyle, 8th Earl of Glasgow was a member of the House of Lords.
- Malcolm Campbell was a racing motorist and a motoring journalist.
- A. K. Chesterton was a journalist.
- Lady Cynthia Curzon (known as 'Cimmie') was the second daughter of George Curzon, Lord Curzon of Kedleston, and she was also the wife of Oswald Mosley until her death in 1933.
- Norah Elam was a suffragette.
- Robert Forgan was previously a Labour Member of Parliament for West Renfrewshire.
- Major General John Frederick Charles Fuller was a military historian and strategist.
- Billy Fullerton was the leader of the Billy Boys gang from Glasgow.
- Arthur Gilligan was the captain of the England cricket team.
- Sir Reginald Goodall was an English conductor.
- Group Captain Sir Louis Greig was a British naval surgeon, a courtier and an intimate of King George VI.
- Jeffrey Hamm was a prominent member and later, he was Mosley's personal secretary.
- Harold Sidney Harmsworth, 1st Viscount Rothermere, was the owner of the Daily Mail and he was also a member of the House of Lords.
- Neil Francis Hawkins was the leader of the Blackshirts.
- Josslyn Hay, 22nd Earl of Erroll, was a member of the House of Lords.
- William Joyce, later nicknamed 'Lord Haw-Haw', was naturalized as a German citizen and broadcast pro-Nazi propaganda from German territory. Captured in Germany at the end of the war, convicted as a traitor and executed.
- Ted "Kid" Lewis was a Jewish boxing champion; he left the party after it became overtly antisemitic.
- David Freeman-Mitford, 2nd Baron Redesdale, was a member of the House of Lords. His wife, Lady Redesdale, and two of his daughters were also members:
  - Diana Mitford (Lady Mosley, after her marriage to Sir Oswald Mosley in 1936)
  - Unity Mitford was an associate of Hitler.
- Tommy Moran was a BUF leader in Derby and later, he was a BUF leader in south Wales.
- Mary Richardson was a suffragette and she was also the head of the BUF's women's section.
- Sir Alliott Verdon Roe was a pilot and a businessman.
- Edward Frederick Langley Russell, 2nd Baron Russell of Liverpool, was a member of the House of Lords.
  - His wife Lady Russell was also a member.
- Edward Russell, 26th Baron de Clifford, was a member of the House of Lords.
- Hastings Russell, 12th Duke of Bedford, was a member of the House of Lords.
- Alexander Raven Thomson was the party's Director of Public Policy.
- Theodore Schurch, a Nazi collaborator who was the last person to be executed for a crime other than murder in the United Kingdom.
- Frank Cyril Tiarks, of German extraction, was a banker, a Director of the Bank of England and a prominent member of the Anglo-German Fellowship.
  - His wife, Emmy née Brödermann, was also a member.
- Frederick Toone was the manager of the England cricket team and the Yorkshire Cricket Club.
- Henry Williamson was a writer, best known for his 1927 work Tarka the Otter.

== Election results ==
By-election	Candidate	Votes	% share
1940 Silvertown by-election	Tommy Moran	151	1.0
1940 Leeds North East by-election	Sydney Allen	722	2.9
1940 Middleton and Prestwich by-election	Frederick Haslam	418	1.3

== See also ==
- List of British fascist parties
- Mosley (1997)
- The flash and circle symbol
- Battle of South Street – an incident between BUF members and anti-fascists in Worthing on 9 October 1934
- Canadian Union of Fascists – an affiliated Canadian political party
