= Mary Adams (broadcaster) =

English TV director and producer (1898–1984)

Mary Adams OBE
- Born: Mary Grace Agnes Campin; 10 March 1898; Hermitage, Berkshire, England
- Died: 15 May 1984 (aged 86); University College Hospital, London
- Education: University College, Cardiff; Newnham College, Cambridge
- Occupations: Television producer; programme director
- Employer(s): British Broadcasting Company; Ministry of Information; The Consumers' Association
- Spouse: Samuel Vyvyan Adams (m. 1925; died 1951)

Mary Grace Agnes Adams OBE (née Campin; 10 March 1898 – 15 May 1984) was an English television producer, programme director and administrator who worked for the BBC. She was instrumental in setting up the BBC's television service both before and after the Second World War. Her daughter says, "She was a socialist, a romantic and could charm with her charisma, spontaneity, and quick informed intelligence. She was a fervent atheist and advocate of humanism and common sense, accepting her stance without subjecting it to analysis." Mary Adams was the first female television producer for the BBC.

== Biography ==
Mary Adams was born on 10 March 1898 at Well House Farm, Hermitage, Berkshire. She gained a first-class honours degree in Botany from the University College of South Wales and Monmouthshire (later Cardiff University). Subsequently Adams studied tissue culture at Newnham College, Cambridge, working at the Strangeways Research Laboratory under Thomas Strangeways. After her series "Six Talks on Heredity" was broadcast on BBC Radio, she left research and joined the BBC's Further Education Department in 1930.

=== Television career ===
In 1936 she joined the fledgling television service at Alexandra Palace, London, and became the first female television producer. From January 1937 she was active in developing the service and producing television programmes (e.g. Clothes-Line, the first television programme dedicated to fashion history, with James Laver and Pearl Binder). She was a working mother with a child, at a time when married women were expected to stay at home and not go out to work.

When the Second World War broke out in 1939, the BBC television service was closed for the duration of the war. She spent the war on BBC Radio and the Ministry of Information. She created the Home Intelligence division, and in 1940 set up a system for monitoring the public mood regarding the war effort. She wrote daily reports on British morale, which have been published.

When the television service resumed in 1946 she returned to working for it – producing programmes on all subjects apart from drama and light entertainment. She was appointed Head of Television Talks in 1954. She retired in 1958.

She encouraged David Attenborough to join BBC Television in 1952, appointed staff and commissioned ground-breaking programmes – such as Zoo Quest; The Quiz Programme; Animal, Vegetable, Mineral; Your Life in Their Hands and A Matter of Life and Death (early medical programmes), as well as programmes for children – Muffin the Mule (with Anne Hogarth, who pulled the strings), Andy Pandy, and Bill and Ben The Flowerpot Men (with Freda Lingstrom and Maria Bird).

After retiring from BBC in 1958 she became a senior figure in the Consumers' Association, which produced the first comparative tests of consumer products, including contraceptives.

=== Marriage ===
Mary Adams (née Campin) married in 1925 Samuel Vyvyan Adams (1900–1951), Conservative MP for Leeds West (1931–1945). He was an early anti-Nazi, and a radical reformer; he was one of only two Conservative MPs to oppose the Munich agreement with Hitler in 1938.

== Sources ==
- Sally Adams, "Adams, Mary Grace Agnes (1898–1984)", Oxford Dictionary of National Biography, Oxford University Press, 2004 accessed 6 Nov 2012 doi:10.1093/ref:odnb/30750
