= Joseph Leicester =

British politician (1825–1903)

Joseph Lynn Leicester (24 December 1825 – 13 October 1903) was an English glass blower and Liberal politician who sat in the House of Commons from 1885 to 1886.

== Early life ==
Born in Warrington, he was the son of Thomas Leicester, a glassblower. At the age of nine, Leicester was apprenticed to his father's trade. In 1850 he moved to Lambeth in London, and was employed for 35 years as a glass-blower by James Powell and Sons of Whitefriars, London. Soon after his arrival in the capital he was appointed secretary of the Glassmakers Trade Society, a position he held for more than forty years. He was sent by the Society of Arts to report upon glass at the Paris Exhibitions in 1867 and 1868. The Society awarded him three first-class prizes for art and in 1870 the Glass Blowers' Society of Great Britain and Ireland presented him with £100 in recognition of his services to the trade. He was a strong temperance advocate, and was in favour of Sunday closing of public houses.

== Political career ==
In the 1885 general election, Leicester was elected Member of Parliament for West Ham South but in the 1886 general election, he was defeated by the Conservative candidate. He made four contributions during his year in parliament. At the 1892 general election he was again chosen to contest the West Ham South seat for the Liberals. However, the party withdrew from the constituency, in favour of Keir Hardie of the Independent Labour Party, who went on to win the seat.

Leicester died at the age of 78 and was buried in Nunhead Cemetery. His gravestone noted:

"From a poor working lad he became an eloquent advocate of temperance, a master craftsman in the art of glass making, and all his life took a foremost part in the social elevation of his fellow workmen, who did honour to themselves and him, by returning him as a Member of Parliament"

"Write him down as one who "loved" his fellow man"

Parliament of the United Kingdom
Preceded by See; South Essex constituency	Member of Parliament for West Ham South; New constituency 1885 – 1886	Succeeded by George Edward Banes
