= Micheline Patton =

Northern Irish actress (1912–2001)

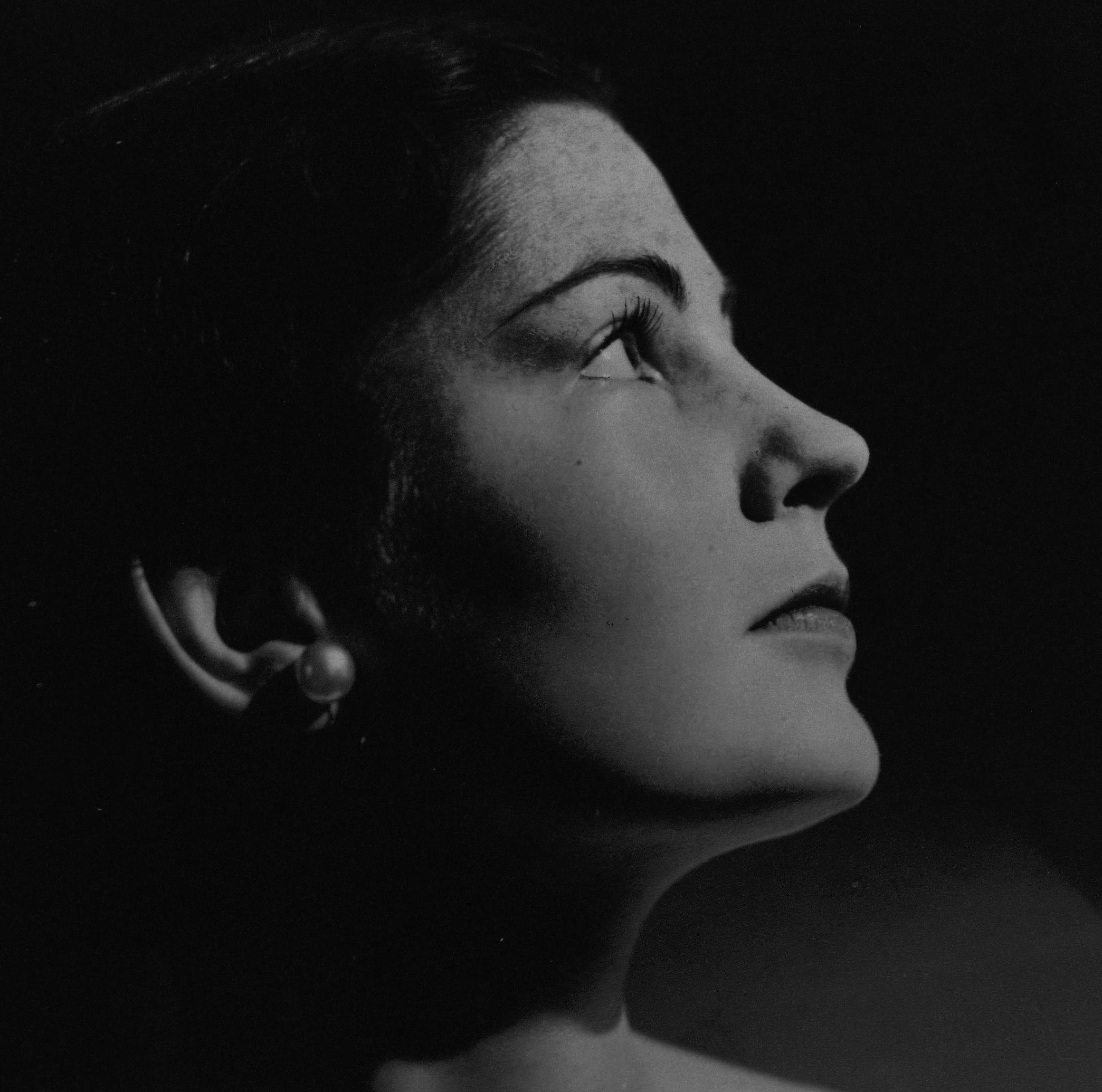
Micheline Patton, c. 1938

Micheline Patton (1912 – 30 June 2001) was an Irish actress who worked on radio, stage and television from the mid-1930s to the mid-1960s.

== Biography ==
Micheline Elizabeth Patton was born in Belfast in 1912, and died on 30 June 2001 in Godalming, Surrey. Her father was Billy Patton, a surgeon. She went to school in Malvern Girls' College, and studied Modern History at St Hugh's College, Oxford, graduating in 1935. One of her cousins was the Irish playwright, BBC producer and war correspondent Denis Johnston.

== Radio ==
Between 1935 and 1947, Patton read several short stories for BBC Radio, including works by Katherine Mansfield, Anton Chekhov, and Helen Colvill. She acted in radio plays, including playing the role of Winifred in the 1947 BBC Radio adaptation of In Chancery from The Forsyte Saga.

== Television ==
Patton acted in early BBC television broadcasts. In December 1937, she appeared in a backless dress in the final episode of the early fashion documentary Clothes-Line. Patton was viewed from behind, giving an illusion of nudity, which led to outraged viewers writing in to complain. The episode was titled Grandmamma Looks Back, inspiring the copresenter Pearl Binder's quip, "Grandmamma looks back but Micheline has no back to be seen."

She went on to appear in a November 1938 adaptation of Robert J. Flaherty's book The Captain's Chair (produced as The Last Voyage of Captain Grant) and in July 1939, a drama based on the Parnell Commission.

In 1947 Patton had a small role in Weep for the Cyclops, a biographical 1947 television drama on Jonathan Swift, which was written and produced by her cousin Denis Johnston.

Patton's final recorded BBC appearance was in 1958, with a role in The Ordeal of Christabel Pankhurst.

== Theatre ==
Patton's best received role was probably as Emily Brontë in The Brontës, by Alfred Sangster, produced by the Sheffield Repertory Company. She played this role from 1946–1949, receiving generally good notices. in 1946 a reviewer for the Brontë Society noted that Patton was so "exceptionally good that one suspected (perhaps too artlessly) a spiritual affinity. What strength that pale, frigid face reflected!" A reviewer for Punch commented on the "interesting" Patton's ability to "suggest dark churnings of the soul." Less enthusiastically, in 1947, a reviewer for Theatre World commented "Micheline Patton does all that could be done with her material," calling the part "poorly written."

1936 on the London stage

- Stubble Before Swords at Globe
- A Bride for the Unicorn at Westminster Theatre

1940 in Dublin

- Roly Poly (Boule de Suif) was withdrawn under Wartime Emergency Legislation (1745 Act).

1941 in Belfast

- The Passing of the Third Floor Back (Jerome K. Jerome) was concurrent with the first Luftwaffe air-raid

1944–1945 in various provincial Scottish theatres

- Dundee Repertory Theatre
  - The Patsy
  - The Housemaster
  - A Soldier for Christmas
  - Seven Bottles for the Maestro
- Perth Repertory Theatre
  - Charley's Aunt
  - Androcles and the Lion
  - Caste
  - Hamlet
  - Sheppey

1946 English provincial theatre

- Bristol Old Vic
  - Weep for the Cyclops

1946–1949 Sheffield Repertory Theatre and touring – most saliently, St James Theatre London

- The Brontes

1949 London Players

- Aftermath

1950 St James Theatre

- Venus Observed

1951 Citizens Theatre Glasgow

- As You Like It

1954 Hythe Summer Theatre

- The Powder Magazine

1957 Piccadilly Theatre

- The Rape of the Belt

1960 Richmond Theatre

- Gracious Living

== Film ==
Patton appeared as Mrs. Broome in The Yellow Teddy Bears in 1963.
