= Backless dress =

Type of dress

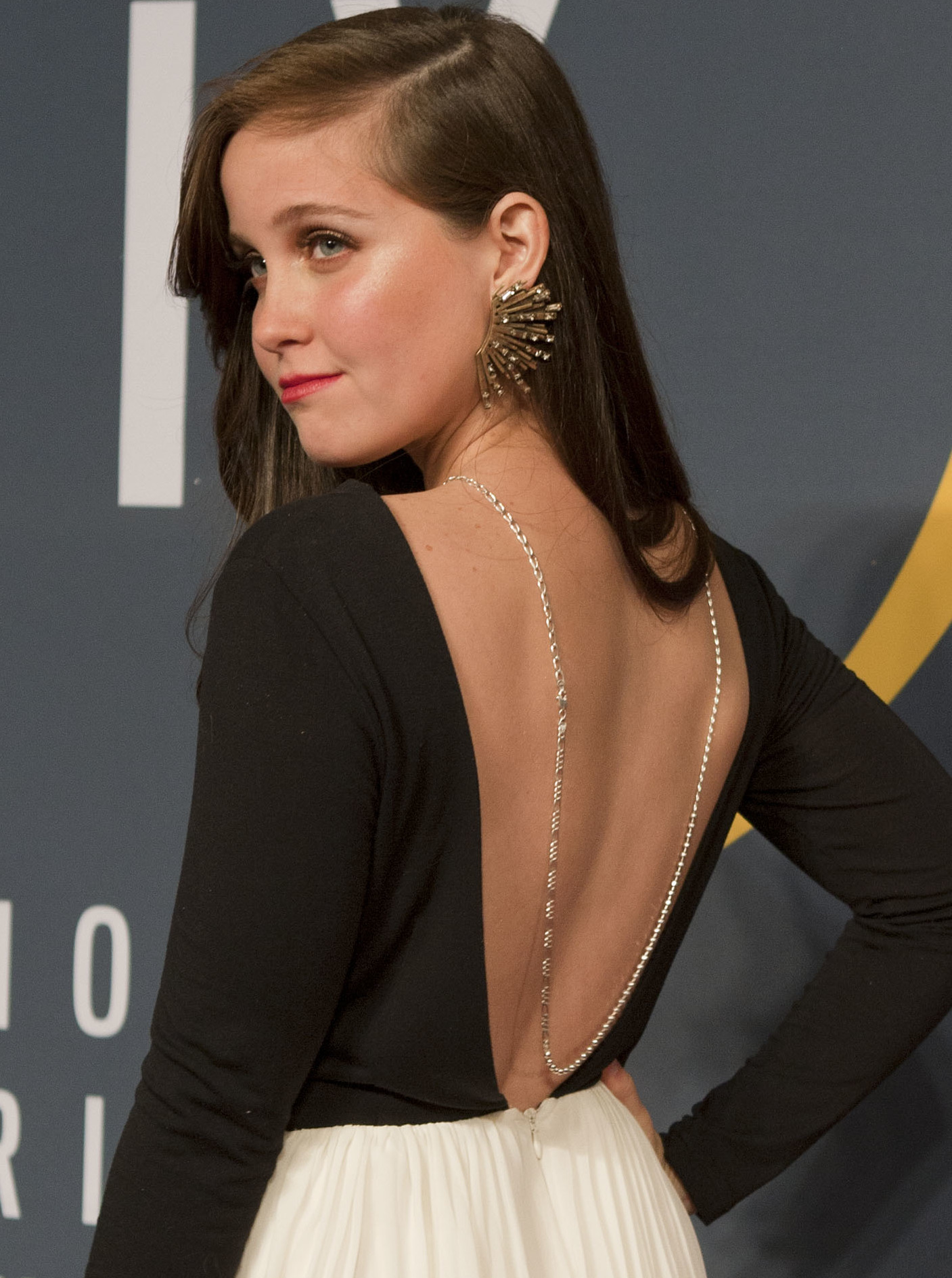
Backless dress, 2014

A backless dress is a style of women's clothing designed to expose the wearer's back. The back may be either partially exposed with a low cut or fully exposed with the use of strings. A backless dress is most commonly worn on formal occasions or as evening wear or as wedding dresses and can be of any length, from a miniskirt-length to floor-length. Other backless styles include backless swimsuits and tops, such as a halter top.

== Evolution ==
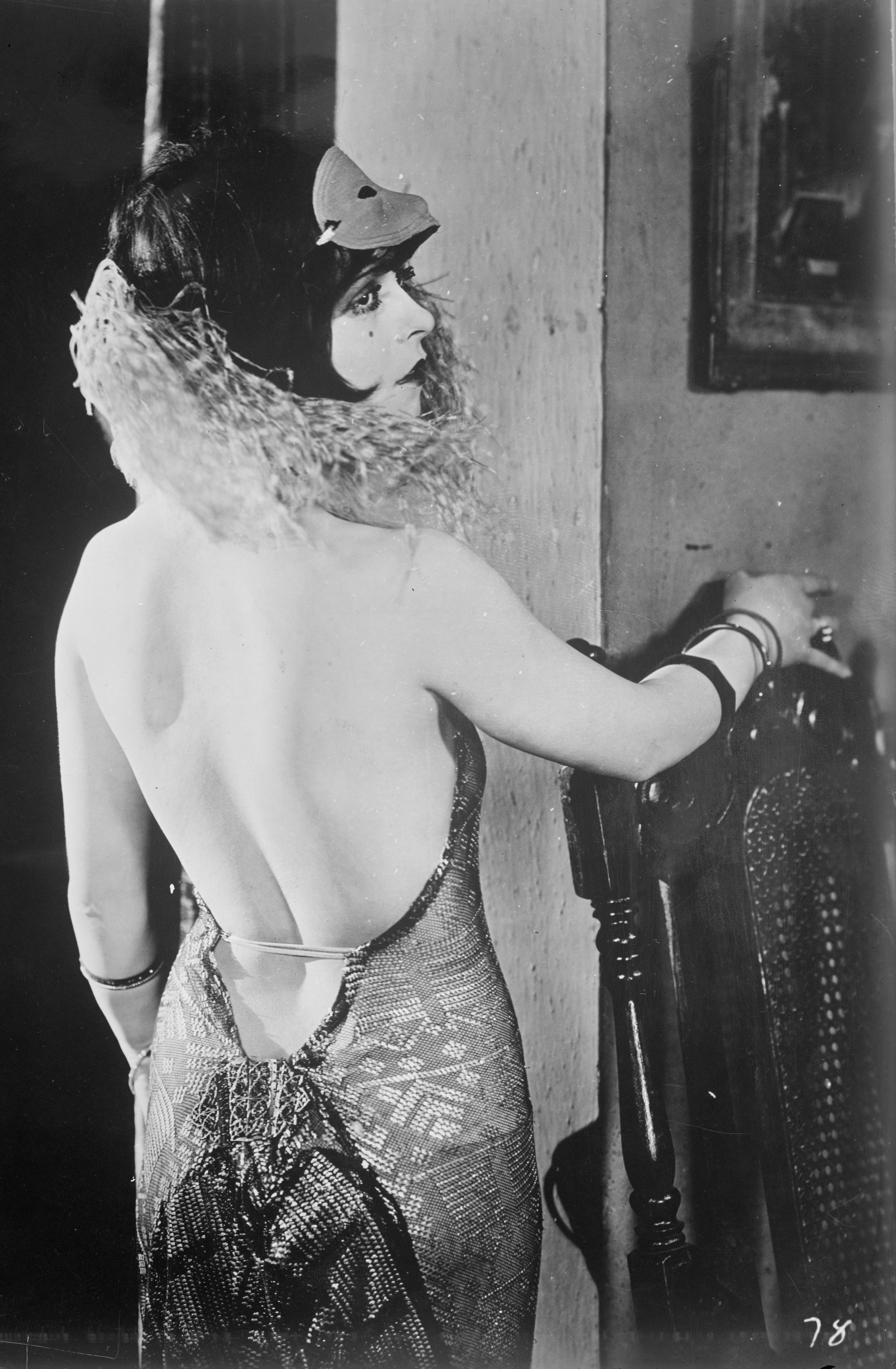
Early backless dress worn by Clara Bow, mid-1920s

Backless dresses first appeared in the 1920s. In the 1930s, the style became associated with the sun tanning fashions of the time, and the backless dress was a way of showing off a tan, usually without tan lines. The wearer usually had to be slim to be able to pull off the effect. In December 1937, the actress Micheline Patton was controversially filmed from behind while wearing a backless dress in the final episode of the early BBC fashion documentary Clothes-Line. The illusion of nudity led to outraged viewers writing in to complain, and Pearl Binder, who co-presented the show, quipped, "Grandmamma looks back but Micheline has no back to be seen."

== Styles ==
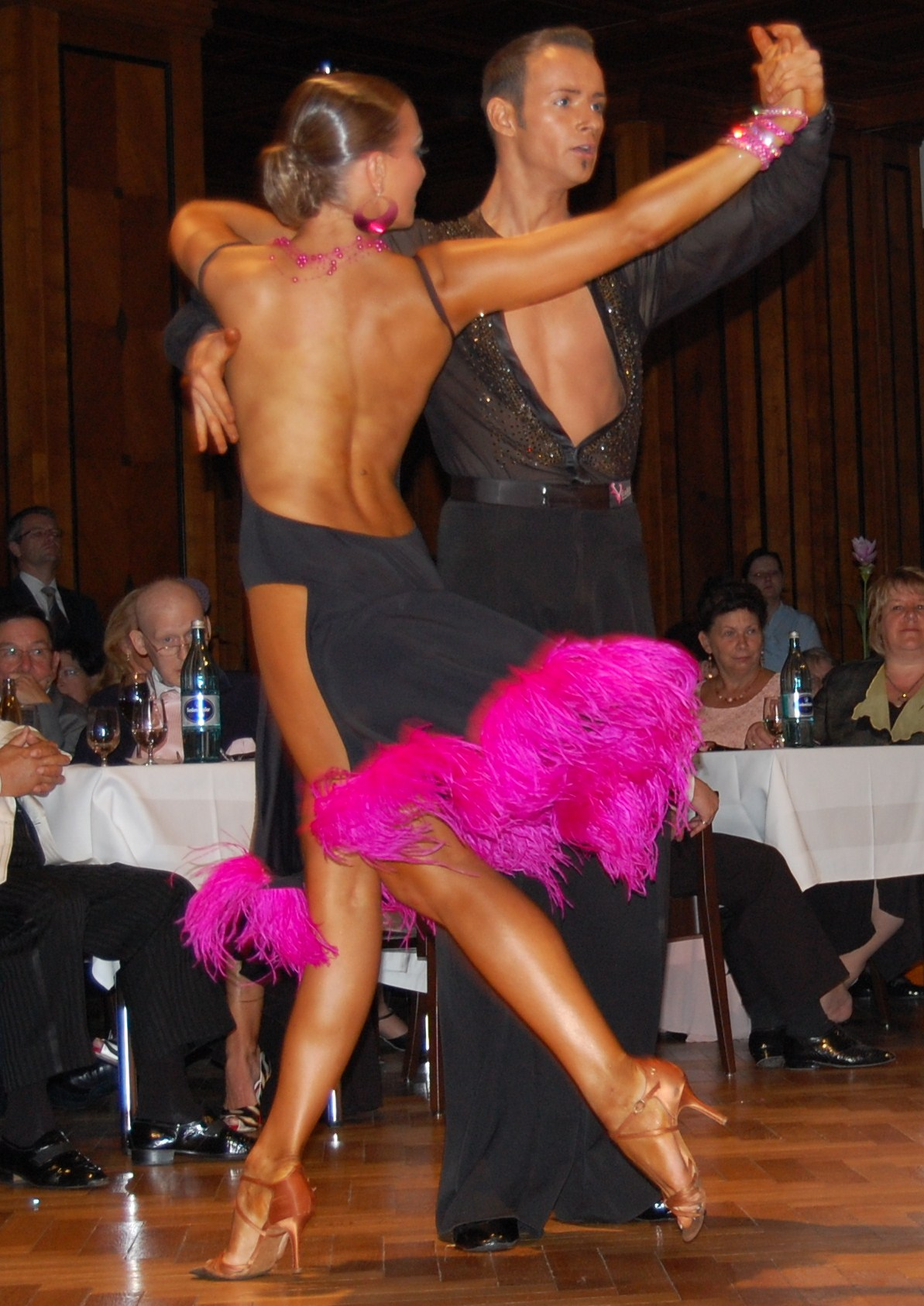
A Latin dancer in a dress with low-cut back

A backless dress can be held up in a number of ways. The most common is by a single piece of cloth or strap which passes behind the wearer's neck, halterneck-style. The neck strap can itself be covered by the wearer's hair, leaving the impression from behind that nothing is holding the dress up. Alternatively, the dress may be held up by short sleeves or by a single or two spaghetti straps, which hold the dress up at the shoulders. An adhesive is another way that a dress can be held up.

=== Choli ===
The backless style is also found in the choli, the blouse worn by Indian women along with saris and ghagras.

The back is either "partially exposed" with a low cut or "fully exposed" by use of strings. The backless styles were created mainly due to the influence of Western fashion. It was made popular by Madhuri Dixit when she wore it and appeared in the Dhak Dhak Karne Laga song. "The drape and the blouse make the saree a sexy ensemble, and my blouses are always low back because I love the peep of the skin against so much fabric", as stated by Indian actress Vidya Balan.

== Breast support ==
Breast support may be an issue for many women when wearing a backless dress, but nevertheless most women choosing this style of top prefer to go braless. Bra designs are available that offer breast support with backless dresses. Some bra designs use convertible styles, adhesive bras, underwire and strapless bras.

== See also ==
- Halterneck
