= 1974 Newham South by-election =

UK parliamentary by-election

- 23 May 1974

Newham South parliamentary seat
	First party	Second party	Third party
Candidate	Nigel Spearing	Ivor Shipley	Michael Lobb
Party	Labour	Liberal	National Front
Popular vote	9,321	1,862	1,713
Percentage	62.6%	12.5%	11.5%
Swing	▼3.5%	▼1.3%	▲4.6%
	Fourth party	Fifth party
Candidate	Frank Fox	Sydney South
Party	Conservative	Independent Labour
Popular vote	1,651	332
Percentage	11.1%	2.2%
Swing	▼1.1%	New
MP before election
Elwyn Jones
Labour
Subsequent MP
Nigel Spearing
Labour

The 1974 Newham South by-election was a by-election held on 23 May 1974 for the British House of Commons constituency of Newham South. It was triggered when Elwyn Jones, the constituency's Labour Party Member of Parliament (MP), was appointed as Lord Chancellor and subsequently awarded a life peerage.

The by-election occurred soon after the February 1974 general election, and indeed proved to be the only by-election of the Parliament, the next general election being held in October. Given that there was a hung parliament, and at the time of the by-election a general election was thought likely, any changes in the share of the vote between the main parties could have given a guide as to the likely future government.

Created for the February general election, the constituency was regarded as a safe Labour seat. Jones had won a majority of more than 50%, and had held the predecessor seat of West Ham South since its creation at the 1950 general election. In February, the Liberal Party and Conservative Party had each shared around one eighth of the vote, while the far right National Front had achieved one of their best results in the country, taking 6.9%.

Labour chose Nigel Spearing as its candidate; previously the MP for Acton, he had lost his seat at the February election. The Liberals, Conservatives and National Front all fielded the same candidates who had stood in February, hoping to build on their performance. An "independent Labour" candidate also stood.

The election campaign was dominated by the impending general election, and by the threat posed by the National Front.

== Result ==
Spearing achieved an easy victory, although his vote dropped slightly from the February election. The Liberal and Conservative votes both dropped slightly, while despite a strong anti-fascist campaign, the National Front picked up votes to finish third, ahead of the Conservatives. The Conservatives had not finished fourth in an English by-election since World War II and did not do so again until Bermondsey in 1983.

At the October general election, Spearing held the seat with an increased majority. The Conservatives and Liberals failed to gain ground, while the National Front began to fall back. Spearing held the seat until it was abolished in 1997.

Newham South by-election 1974
Party	Candidate	Votes	%	±%
Labour	Nigel Spearing	9,321	62.6	−3.5
Liberal	Ivor Shipley	1,862	12.5	−2.3
National Front	Michael Lobb	1,713	11.5	+4.6
Conservative	Frank Fox	1,651	11.1	−1.1
Independent Labour	Sydney South	332	2.2	New
Majority		7,459	50.1	−1.2
Turnout		14,879		
Labour hold		Swing		

== Previous result ==
General election February 1974: Newham South
Party	Candidate	Votes	%	±%
Labour	Elwyn Jones	23,952	66.1	
Liberal	Ivor Shipley	5,369	14.8	
Conservative	Frank Fox	4,422	12.2	
National Front	Michael Lobb	2,511	6.9	
Majority		18,583	51.3	
Turnout		36,254	63.2	
Labour win (new seat)				
