= Will Thorne =

British trade unionist and politician (1857–1946)

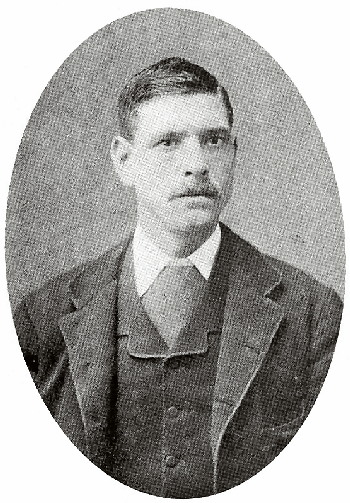
Will Thorne.

William James Thorne CBE (8 October 1857 – 2 January 1946) was a British trade unionist, activist and one of the first Labour Members of Parliament.

== Early years ==
Thorne was born in Hockley, Birmingham, on 8 October 1857. His father and other relatives worked as brickmakers. Thorne's father died in a fight when Thorne was just seven years old. Thorne began working at the age of six, turning a wheel for a rope and twine spinner, working from six in the morning to six at night, with half an hour's break for breakfast and an hour for dinner. Thorne recalls that when the spinner wanted to reduce his wages from 2 shillings and 6 pence to 2 shillings, he "went on strike" and never returned to the job.

The family was on poor relief. Thorne's mother and three sisters worked all hours sewing hooks and eyes. "It was here I had intimate experience with sweated labour", he commented without irony. Thorne took a job with his uncle at a brick and tile works, and later, at another brickworks further away. At the age of nine, Thorne recalled: "my mother got me up at four o'clock every morning to give me my breakfast". It was a five-mile walk to work.

I had to give up this job finally because my mother said that the work was too hard and the distance too long for me to walk every morning and night.

I remember her telling me that the 8 s[hillings] a week would be missed; some one would have to go short. But it was no use being slowly killed by such work as I was doing, and it was making me hump backed. It was not until I had been away from the work for several weeks that I was able to straighten myself out again.

My mother's rebellion against the way I was being worked is the rebellion of many mothers. It is the rebellion that I feel, and will continue to carry on.

— Will Thorne, My Life's Battles, p19

== Political career ==
Will Thorne as he appeared around the turn of the twentieth century.

Thorne served for many years on West Ham Borough Council and was Mayor from 1917 to 1918.

In 1882, Thorne moved to London and found employment at a gasworks. Thorne joined the Social Democratic Federation (SDF) and became branch secretary. Barely literate, Thorne improved his reading skills with the assistance of Karl Marx's daughter, Eleanor Marx.

In 1889, he helped to found the National Union of Gas Workers and General Labourers, one of the prominent New Unions and became its general secretary. He retained this position in the union and its successors, which became the GMWU in 1924, up to 1934. Thorne also helped to organise the London Dock Strike in 1889.

He contested several elections as a Labour candidate, before finally winning a seat representing West Ham South at the 1906 general election. He remained with the SDF as it became the British Socialist Party. Thorne visited the Soviet Union shortly after the Russian Revolution of 1917.

He won the seat of Plaistow in 1918 with 94.9% of the vote, a record for a Labour candidate which stands to this day. He retained it until his retirement at the 1945 general election, aged 87 — the oldest sitting member at the time.

== Family ==
Thorne was married four times, to Harriet Hallam (married 1879, died 1895), Frances Emily Byford (known as Emily; married 1895, died ?) Rebecca Cecilia Sinclair (married 1925, died 1926), and Beatrice Nellie Collins (married 1930) by whom he was survived. With Harriet he had four sons and three daughters, and with Emily three sons and three daughters. His son, also named William, was killed in action during the First World War.

== Awards / Commemorations ==
Thorne was appointed Commander of the Order of the British Empire (CBE) in 1930 and Privy Councillor in 1945.

A Greater London Council blue plaque, unveiled in 1987, commemorates Thorne at his home, 1 Lawrence Road, E13 0QD, in West Ham. In addition, the Will Thorne Pavilion in Beckton Park in Beckton is named for Thorne.

The GMB's regional office in Halesowen is named Will Thorne House after the former NUGWGL leader (the NUGWGL/GMWU being a founding component of the GMB in 1982). The GMB's Thorne Credit Union is likewise named for Will Thorne.

== Footnotes ==
Parliament of the United Kingdom
Preceded by George Edward Banes	Member of Parliament for West Ham South; 1906–1918	Constituency abolished
New constituency	Member of Parliament for Plaistow; 1918–1945	Succeeded by Elwyn Jones
Preceded by Edward Fielden	Oldest sitting member (not Father of the House); 1935–1945	Succeeded by Murdo Macdonald
Trade union offices
Preceded by New position	General Secretary of the National Union of Gasworkers and General Labourers; 1889–1924	Succeeded by Position abolished
Preceded by Edward Cowey	Chairman of the Parliamentary Committee of the Trades Union Congress; 1896	Succeeded by Alexander Wilkie
Preceded by Edward Harford and Havelock Wilson	Trades Union Congress representative to the American Federation of Labour; 1898; With: William Inskip	Succeeded by James Haslam and Alexander Wilkie
Preceded by William Mullin	President of the Trades Union Congress; 1912	Succeeded by William John Davis
Preceded by New position	General Secretary of the National Union of General and Municipal Workers; 1924–1934	Succeeded by Charles Dukes
Party political offices
Preceded by T. M. Purvis	President of the Social Democratic Federation; 1900	Succeeded by Dan Irving
