= Clothes-Line =

1937 BBC television series

- Genre: Documentary, Fashion
- Created by: Mary Adams
- Presented by: James Laver and Pearl Binder
- Country of origin: United Kingdom
- Original language: English

Production
- Producer: Mary Adams

Original release
- Network: BBC Television Service
- Release: 30 September – 9 December 1937

Clothes-Line is an early BBC television programme broadcast live in six parts between 30 September and 3 December 1937. It is notable for being the first television programme dedicated to the history of fashion. It was produced by Mary Adams, and co-presented by the fashion historian James Laver and Pearl "Polly" Binder.

== Broadcast times ==
- Episode 1: Clothes-Line, broadcast at 21.20 on Thursday 30 September 1937
- Episode 2: The Sporting Woman, broadcast at 21.20 on Thursday 14 October 1937
- Episode 3: Fossilized Clothes, broadcast at 21.15 on Thursday 28 October 1937
- Episode 4: Hats and Headgear, broadcast at 21.15 on Tuesday 9 November 1937
- Episode 5: Influences at Work, broadcast at 21.15 on Thursday 19 November 1937
- Episode 6: Grandmamma Looks Back, broadcast at 21.10 on Thursday 9 December 1937

Episode 4 was broadcast on the Tuesday that week rather than the Thursday due to Remembrance Day falling that Thursday.

== Concept ==
Clothes-Line illustrated the development of fashion history through live models in original costumes from C. Willett Cunnington's collection. Laver provided verse commentary on the garments, while Binder drew lightning sketches and illustrations at an easel. After the first episode was broadcast, The Listener commented: "we were left wondering quite what it was we had just seen and heard – a poetry-reading, a lightning-artist display, a mannequin parade, or what?" As they went on to acknowledge, Clothes-Line in fact used features of all three to create a new type of television programme.

== Controversies ==
=== Pregnancy ===
In addition to being the first television programme to deal with fashion history, Clothes-Line may well have been the first television programme to feature a heavily pregnant woman. Binder had been pregnant with her first child when discussions for the programme first began, and a conscious decision was made to have her as a presenter. As she got closer to her due date, and had to stand further back from her easel, the noticeability of Binder's condition caused consternation amongst the BBC. Binder's daughter Josephine was not born until 6 January 1938, almost a month after the last episode aired on 9 December 1937.

=== Nudity ===
The last show episode, Grandmamma Looks Back, aired on 9 December 1937 and a fashionable backless evening dress worn by Micheline Patton, the actress playing the granddaughter to Nesta Sawyer's grandmother, was the cause of accusations of public nudity due to the filming angle from behind. Binder recollected in her diary that outraged viewers wrote in to complain.

== Repeats (Clothes Through The Centuries) ==
The first series was, as with so many early BBC programmes, broadcast live. The controversy of the final episode notwithstanding, it was so well received that it was decided to repeat the programme in early 1938. Laver, Binder, Adams, Patton and Sawyer all returned to reprise their roles for the second (revised) version, which consisted of three parts, and was renamed Clothes Through The Centuries. The episode titles were:

- Episode 1. Grandmamma Looks Back, broadcast at 21.10 on Sunday 10 April 1938
- Episode 2: The Sporting Girl, broadcast at 21.10 on Monday 2 May 1938
- Episode 3: Legendary Loveliness from Nefertiti to Lily Langtry, broadcast at 22.00 on Friday 3 June 1938
