= Plaistow (constituency) =

Former parliamentary constituency in the United Kingdom

- Former borough constituency for the House of Commons
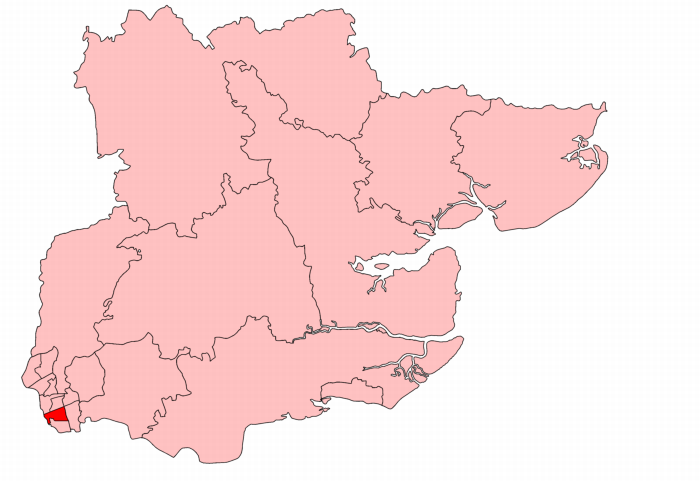
- Plaistow within Essex, showing boundaries used from 1918 to 1950.
- County: Essex

1918–1950
- Seats: One
- Created from: West Ham South
- Replaced by: West Ham South

Plaistow was a borough constituency returning a single Member of Parliament to the House of Commons of the Parliament of the United Kingdom through the first-past-the-post voting system. The constituency was one of four divisions of the Parliamentary Borough of West Ham, which had at the time the same boundaries as the County Borough of West Ham. Although administratively separate since 1889, the area was formally part of the county of Essex; since 1965 it has been part of the London Borough of Newham in Greater London.

The creation of the constituency was recommended by the Boundary Commission in a report issued in 1917, and formally created by the Representation of the People Act 1918. It came into existence at the 1918 general election. Its first member was Labour's Will(iam) Thorne who won with an impressive 94.9% of the popular vote, a record for an English parliamentary seat held to this day. As the borough of West Ham had only 120,586 electors on 15 October 1946, the relevant date for the subsequent Boundary Commission review, the borough was only entitled to two Members of Parliament; North and South divisions were recommended. As a consequence Plaistow was abolished as a separate constituency by the Representation of the People Act 1948 and went out of existence at the 1950 general election.

== Boundaries ==
Plaistow was based on Plaistow and Hudsons wards of the County Borough of West Ham. The large wards in the southern County Borough of West Ham at the time of the 1917 Boundary Commission review made it necessary to split one ward across two constituencies, or else the divisions of West Ham would have had significantly different sizes. The ward which was split was the Canning Town ward, with the northern and western part of the ward included in Plaistow: the commissioners drew a line along the centre of the Woolwich branch of the Great Eastern Railway (now the North London Line) from Canning Town station north to join up with Star Lane (near the future Star Lane DLR station), then east along Star Lane, to join up with the ward boundary at Hermit Lane and Beckton Road.

In 1950 the territory of this division was transferred to form part of the West Ham South constituency.

== Members of Parliament ==
Election	Member	Party
1918	Will Thorne	Labour
1945	Elwyn Jones	Labour
1950	constituency abolished	

== Elections ==
=== Elections in the 1910s ===
General election 1918: Plaistow
Party	Candidate	Votes	%	±%
Labour	Will Thorne	12,156	94.9	
Independent Liberal	Arnold Lupton	657	5.1	
Majority		11,499	89.8	
Turnout		12,813	37.8	
Labour win (new seat)				

=== Elections in the 1920s ===
General election 1922: Plaistow
Party	Candidate	Votes	%	±%
Labour	Will Thorne	12,321	63.3	−31.6
Unionist	George Penny	7,140	36.7	New
Majority		5,181	26.6	−63.2
Turnout		19,461	54.7	+16.9
Labour hold		Swing		

General election 1923: Plaistow
Party	Candidate	Votes	%	±%
Labour	Will Thorne	13,638	74.6	+11.3
Unionist	George Penny	4,643	25.4	−11.3
Majority		8,995	49.2	+22.6
Turnout		18,281	49.9	−4.8
Labour hold		Swing	+11.3	

General election 1924: Plaistow
Party	Candidate	Votes	%	±%
Labour	Will Thorne	15,609	67.1	−7.5
Unionist	George Penny	7,638	32.9	+7.5
Majority		7,971	34.2	−15.0
Turnout		23,247	62.1	+12.2
Labour hold		Swing	-7.5	

General election 1929: Plaistow
Party	Candidate	Votes	%	±%
Labour	Will Thorne	23,635	77.5	+10.4
Unionist	Stephen M Lancaster	6,851	22.5	−10.4
Majority		16,784	55.0	+20.8
Turnout		30,486	63.2	+1.1
Labour hold		Swing	+10.4	

=== Elections in the 1930s ===
General election 1931: Plaistow
Party	Candidate	Votes	%	±%
Labour	Will Thorne	Unopposed	N/A	N/A
Labour hold				

General election 1935: Plaistow
Party	Candidate	Votes	%	±%
Labour	Will Thorne	18,493	73.3	N/A
Conservative	Margaret Dorothy Roddick	6,730	26.7	New
Majority		11,763	46.6	N/A
Turnout		25,223	53.1	N/A
Labour hold		Swing	N/A	

General Election 1939–40

Another General Election was required to take place before the end of 1940. The political parties had been making preparations for an election to take place and by the Autumn of 1939, the following candidates had been selected;

- Labour: Will Thorne
- Conservative:

=== Elections in the 1940s ===
General election 1945: Plaistow
Party	Candidate	Votes	%	±%
Labour	Elwyn Jones	17,351	87.6	+14.3
Conservative	John Baldwin Raper	2,463	12.4	−14.3
Majority		14,888	75.2	+28.6
Turnout		19,814	68.4	+15.3
Labour hold		Swing	+14.3	

== Bibliography ==
- Boundaries of Parliamentary Constituencies 1885-1972, compiled and edited by F.W.S. Craig (Parliamentary Reference Publications 1972)
- Craig, F. W. S. (1983) [1969]. British parliamentary election results 1918–1949 (3rd ed.). Chichester: Parliamentary Research Services. ISBN 0-900178-06-X.
- Leigh Rayment's Historical List of MPs – Constituencies beginning with "P" (part 1)
