= Nigel Spearing =

British politician

Member of Parliament
- In office 23 May 1974 – 8 April 1997
- Preceded by: Elwyn Jones
- Succeeded by: Constituency abolished
- Constituency: Newham South
- In office 18 June 1970 – 8 February 1974
- Preceded by: Kenneth Baker
- Succeeded by: George Young
- Constituency: Acton

Personal details
- Born: 8 October 1930 London, England
- Died: 8 January 2017 (aged 86) London, England
- Party: Labour
- Spouse: Wendy Newman (m. 1956)
- Children: 3
- Education: St Catharine's College, Cambridge

Nigel John Spearing (8 October 1930 – 8 January 2017) was a British Labour Party politician who was the MP for Acton from 1970 to 1974, and for Newham South from 1974 to 1997.

== Background ==
Nigel John Spearing was born in Hammersmith, London. His father had been a Liberal parliamentary candidate. He was educated at Latymer Upper School, Hammersmith and St Catharine's College, Cambridge, where he read geography. He served with the Royal Corps of Signals during his national service. After graduating from Cambridge in 1956, he worked as a tutor and teacher, firstly at Wandsworth School (1956–68) and then at Elliott School, Putney (1969–70).

== Career ==
After coming second in Warwick and Leamington in 1964, Spearing was elected as the Labour Member of Parliament for Acton at the 1970 general election, regaining a seat which the Labour Party had lost to the Conservative Kenneth Baker in a 1968 by-election. Spearing turned Baker's by-election majority of 3,720 into a Labour majority of 660. Prior to the February 1974 general election, the Acton constituency underwent major boundary changes and he was defeated in his bid for re-election by the Conservative Party candidate George Young by 1,451 votes.

Spearing then returned to parliament a few weeks later after winning the Newham South by-election (caused by the constituency's MP, Elwyn Jones, being made a life peer in order to take on the role of Lord Chancellor) with a majority of 9,321. This was the only by-election held in the February–October 1974 Parliament. Spearing was then re-elected at the October 1974 general election, and held the Newham South seat until 1997, when the seat was abolished. Spearing and a neighbouring Labour MP Mildred Gordon both applied for the newly created seat of Poplar and Canning Town, but both were passed over in favour of local Labour politician and firefighter Jim Fitzpatrick.

Spearing was opposed to British membership of the European Economic Community. Although he was interested in many issues, including transport, he devoted much of his time to campaigning against the EEC/EU, not least because he believed that 'many of the most pressing domestic political issues of the day could also be firmly connected with European Union institutions and directives.'

== Personal life and death ==
In 1956, Spearing married Wendy Newman, and they had three children. On 8 January 2017, he died in hospital from Alzheimer's disease, in the London Borough of Hammersmith and Fulham; he was 86.

== Sources ==
- Times Guide to the House of Commons, 1992 and 1997 editions.

== Personal Papers ==
- Nigel Spearing deposited a set of his personal papers relating to education and government to the Institute of Education at the University of London in March 2006. Archives of the Institute of Education (archive reference: GBR/0366/NS)
- The Papers of Nigel Spearing held at Churchill Archives Centre

Parliament of the United Kingdom
Preceded by Kenneth Baker	Member of Parliament for Acton; 1970–Feb 1974	Succeeded by Sir George Young, Bt
Preceded by Elwyn Jones	Member of Parliament for Newham South; 1974–1997	Succeeded by (constituency abolished)
