= Elwyn Jones, Baron Elwyn-Jones =

British politician (1909–1989)

The Right Honourable The Lord Elwyn-Jones CH PC QC
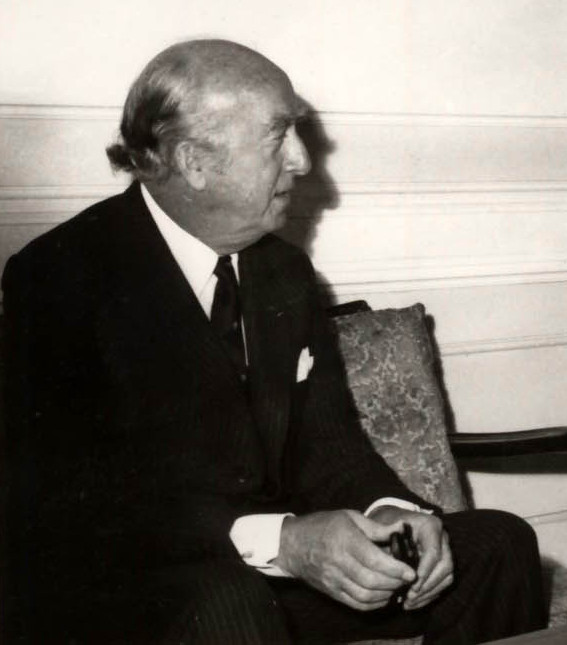
- Elwyn-Jones in 1976

Lord Chancellor
- In office 4 March 1974 – 4 May 1979
- Monarch: Elizabeth II
- Prime Minister: Harold Wilson; James Callaghan
- Preceded by: The Lord Hailsham of St Marylebone
- Succeeded by: The Lord Hailsham of St Marylebone

Shadow Lord Chancellor
- In office 2 October 1983 – 9 January 1989
- Leader: Neil Kinnock
- Preceded by: Position established
- Succeeded by: The Lord Mishcon

Shadow Attorney General for England and Wales
- In office 19 June 1970 – 4 March 1974
- Leader: Harold Wilson
- Preceded by: Peter Rawlinson
- Succeeded by: Peter Rawlinson

Attorney General for England and Wales
- In office 16 October 1964 – 19 June 1970
- Prime Minister: Harold Wilson
- Preceded by: John Hobson
- Succeeded by: Peter Rawlinson

Member of the House of Lords Lord Temporal
- In office 11 March 1974 – 4 December 1989; Life peerage

Member of Parliament for Newham South West Ham South (1950–1974) Plaistow (1945–1950)
- In office 5 July 1945 – 11 March 1974
- Preceded by: Will Thorne
- Succeeded by: Nigel Spearing

Personal details
- Born: Frederick Elwyn Jones; 24 October 1909 Llanelli, Wales
- Died: 4 December 1989 (aged 80) Brighton, England
- Party: Labour
- Spouse: Pearl Binder (m. 1937)
- Children: 3, including Dan
- Education: University of Wales, Aberystwyth; Gonville and Caius College, Cambridge; City Law School

Frederick Elwyn Elwyn-Jones, Baron Elwyn-Jones, CH, PC, QC (24 October 1909 – 4 December 1989), commonly known as Elwyn Jones, was a Welsh barrister and Labour politician.

== Background and education ==
Elwyn Jones was born in Llanelli, Carmarthenshire. He was educated at Llanelli County School, before going on to read history for a year at the University of Wales, Aberystwyth, and then at Gonville and Caius College, Cambridge. He spent time in Germany in the 1930s.

An acting bombardier in the Royal Artillery (Territorial Army), he was commissioned as a second lieutenant on 23 December 1939. He ended his service as a major.

== Legal career ==
Jones became a barrister and Recorder of Merthyr Tydfil. He was also a broadcaster and journalist. He served as junior British Counsel during the Nuremberg Trials, and led for the prosecution (Leading Prosecutor) at the Hamburg trial of Marshal Erich von Manstein in 1948. He was appointed Queen's Counsel in 1953.

In 1966, he led the prosecution of the Moors murderers, Ian Brady and Myra Hindley.

== Political career ==
At the 1945 general election, he was elected as Labour Member of Parliament for Plaistow, east London. In 1950, he became MP for West Ham South, serving until 1974. In 1964, Elwyn Jones was sworn of the Privy Council and appointed Attorney General (receiving the customary knighthood) by Harold Wilson, a post he held until 1970.

In February 1974, he was once again elected to Parliament, now for Newham South, but left the House of Commons soon afterwards when he was made a life peer. On 11 March, he was created Baron Elwyn-Jones, of Llanelli in the County of Carmarthen and of Newham in Greater London, with a change of his surname to Elwyn-Jones. The resulting by-election allowed Nigel Spearing to re-enter Parliament as he had lost the Acton seat in the February election. He served as Lord Chancellor from 1974 to 1979, under Harold Wilson and James Callaghan. In 1976 he was made a Member of the Order of the Companions of Honour.

== Personal life ==
In 1937, Jones married Pearl "Polly" Binder, an artist from Manchester. The couple had three children: Josephine, Lou and Dan. Josephine became a researcher on Jacob Bronowski's TV series The Ascent of Man and married Francis Gladstone (a great-grandson of Prime Minister William Gladstone). Dan Jones is an artist, collector of children's playground songs and human rights campaigner.

Elwyn-Jones's brother Idris (1900–1971) was captain of the Wales rugby union team in 1925, and was an industrial chemist who became Director General of Research Development for the National Coal Board.

Elwyn-Jones died in December 1989, aged 80.

== Arms ==
Coat of arms of Elwyn Jones, Baron Elwyn-Jones
Notes Displayed at the House of Lords. Crest Out of a mural crown Or between two dragon's wings Gules from a panache an (eagle's?) claw holding two hammers in saltire Or. Torse Or and Gules. Escutcheon Per saltire Gules and barry wavy Argent and Azure two crane arms in saltire the hooks pendant between in chief a portcullis chained and in base a balance Or. Supporters Dexter: a man proper vested Azure the trousers Brunatre wearing an apron and a scarf Argent holding in the dexter hand blacksmiths' pliers Proper; sinister a woman Proper vested Azure and Argent holding on the sinister arm a basket of potatoes and leeks Proper. Motto GWNA DY ORAU

Parliament of the United Kingdom
Preceded by Will Thorne	Member of Parliament for Plaistow; 1945–1950	Constituency abolished
New constituency	Member of Parliament for West Ham South; 1950 – 1974	Constituency abolished
New constituency	Member of Parliament for Newham South; 1974	Succeeded by Nigel Spearing
Political offices
Preceded by John Hobson	Attorney General for England and Wales; 1964–1970	Succeeded by Peter Rawlinson
Preceded by The Lord Hailsham of St Marylebone	Lord High Chancellor of Great Britain; 1974–1979	Succeeded by The Lord Hailsham of St Marylebone
New office	Shadow Lord Chancellor; 1983–1989	Succeeded by The Lord Mishcon
