= Newham South =

UK Parliament constituency (1974–1997)

- Former borough constituency for the House of Commons

February 1974–1997
- Seats: one
- Created from: East Ham South, West Ham South and Woolwich East
- Replaced by: East Ham, West Ham and Poplar and Canning Town

Newham South was a parliamentary constituency in the London Borough of Newham, in east London. It returned one Member of Parliament (MP) to the House of Commons of the Parliament of the United Kingdom.

== History ==
The constituency was created for the February 1974 general election, and abolished for the 1997 general election.

The constituency shared boundaries with the Newham South electoral division for election of councillors to the Greater London Council at elections in 1973, 1977 and 1981.

== Boundaries ==
The constituency consisted of the southern portion of the London Borough of Newham, the wards of Beckton, Bemersyde, Canning Town and Grange, Custom House and Silvertown, Hudsons, Ordnance, Plaistow, and South. It included North Woolwich, which had previously been included in seats with the rest of Woolwich on the other side of the River Thames.

== Members of Parliament ==
Election	Member	Party
Feb 1974	Elwyn Jones	Labour
1974 by-election	Nigel Spearing	Labour
1997	constituency abolished	

== Election results ==
=== Elections in the 1970s ===
General election February 1974: Newham South
Party	Candidate	Votes	%	±%
Labour	Elwyn Jones	23,952	66.1	
Liberal	Ivor Shipley	5,369	14.8	
Conservative	Frank Fox	4,422	12.2	
National Front	Michael Lobb	2,511	6.9	
Majority		18,583	51.3	
Turnout		36,254	63.2	
Labour win (new seat)				

By-election 1974: Newham South
Party	Candidate	Votes	%	±%
Labour	Nigel Spearing	9,321	62.6	−3.5
Liberal	Ivor Shipley	1,862	12.5	−2.3
National Front	Michael Lobb	1,713	11.5	+3.6
Conservative	Frank Fox	1,651	11.1	−1.2
Independent Labour	Sydney South	332	2.2	New
Majority		7,459	50.1	−1.2
Turnout		14,879		
Labour hold		Swing		

General election October 1974: Newham South
Party	Candidate	Votes	%	±%
Labour	Nigel Spearing	21,332	69.3	+3.2
Liberal	Ivor Shipley	3,611	11.7	−3.1
Conservative	A.D.C. Gemmill	3,440	11.2	−1.0
National Front	Oliver Bayly	2,412	7.8	+0.9
Majority		17,721	57.6	+6.3
Turnout		30,795	53.4	−9.8
Labour hold		Swing	+3.2	

General election 1979: Newham South
Party	Candidate	Votes	%	±%
Labour	Nigel Spearing	19,636	64.4	−4.9
Conservative	Mary-Jo Elphicke	6,863	22.5	+11.3
Liberal	John Ozimek	2,085	6.8	−4.9
National Front	Ian Anderson	1,899	6.2	−1.6
Majority		12,773	41.9	−15.7
Turnout		30,483	57.1	+3.7
Labour hold		Swing	−8.1	

=== Elections in the 1980s ===
General election 1983: Newham South
Party	Candidate	Votes	%	±%
Labour	Nigel Spearing	13,561	50.2	−14.2
SDP	Andrew Reilly	6,250	23.1	+16.3
Conservative	Nicholas Thompson	6,212	23.0	+0.5
National Front	Ian Anderson	993	3.7	−2.5
Majority		7,311	27.1	−13.2
Turnout		27,016	53.6	−3.5
Labour hold		Swing	−7.4	

General election 1987: Newham South
Party	Candidate	Votes	%	±%
Labour	Nigel Spearing	12,935	43.5	−6.7
Conservative	James Farrie	10,169	34.2	+11.2
SDP	Alex Kellaway	6,607	22.2	−0.9
Majority		2,766	9.3	−17.8
Turnout		29,711	59.1	+5.5
Labour hold		Swing	−8.0	

=== Elections in the 1990s ===
General election 1992: Newham South
Party	Candidate	Votes	%	±%
Labour	Nigel Spearing	14,358	46.6	+3.1
Conservative	Jacqueline Foster	11,856	38.5	+4.3
Liberal Democrats	Alec Kellaway	4,527	14.9	−7.3
Majority		2,502	8.1	−1.2
Turnout		30,786	60.2	+1.1
Labour hold		Swing	−0.6	

== Bibliography ==
- Leigh Rayment's Historical List of MPs – Constituencies beginning with "N" (part 1)
