= Halterneck =

Type of neckline in women's clothing

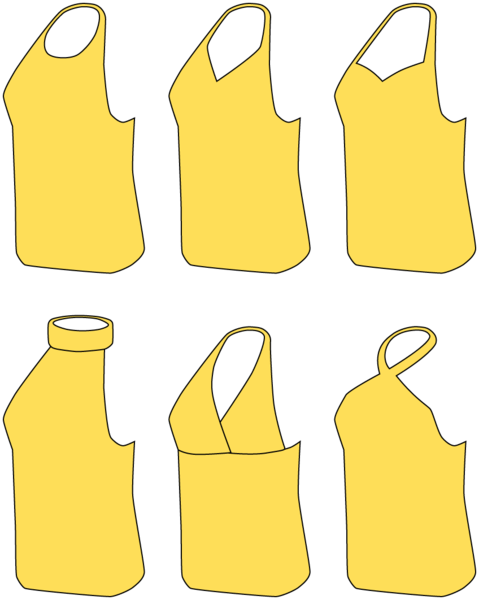
These are various styles of halterneck attire.

Halterneck is a style of women's clothing strap that runs from the front of the garment around the back of the neck, generally leaving the upper back uncovered. The name comes from livestock halters. The word "halter" means "holder" or "that which holds" and is of Germanic origin.

The halter style is used with swimsuits to maximize sun exposure on the back and minimize tan lines. It is also used with dresses or shirts to create a backless dress or top. The neck strap can be covered by the wearer's hair, leaving the impression from behind that nothing is holding the dress or shirt up.

If a bra is worn with a halter top, it is generally either strapless or is a halterneck construction itself. This is to avoid exposing the back straps of a typical bra.

A halter top is a type of sleeveless shirt similar to a tank top but with the straps being tied behind the neck. In another style of the halter top, there is only a narrow strap behind the neck and a narrow strap behind the middle of the back, making it mostly backless. This design resembles many bikini tops, although it covers the chest more. This design can cover some, all or none of the abdomen at the front.

It has been suggested that the neckline's appeal stems from both an aesthetic and practical purpose. The neckline eliminates the potential for unappealing straps in the back, leaving exposed skin to absorb sunlight and display an aesthetic taste.

== Cultural impact ==
=== 1930s ===
The general halterneck style didn't gain large social recognition until the 1930s. The style first started trending through the fashion of French fashion designer Madeleine Vionnet. Vionnet often used the halterneck style in her most notable designs of the 1930s. In 1936, Vionnet showcased her famous "Carnival Dress," now recognized as one of the earliest documented examples of the halterneck being used as a statement in a high fashion design. The dress contains a bias-cut silk halter bodice that is found with a removable skirt made of black silk net. The Carnival Dress can now be found in a collection in the Metropolitan Museum of Art.

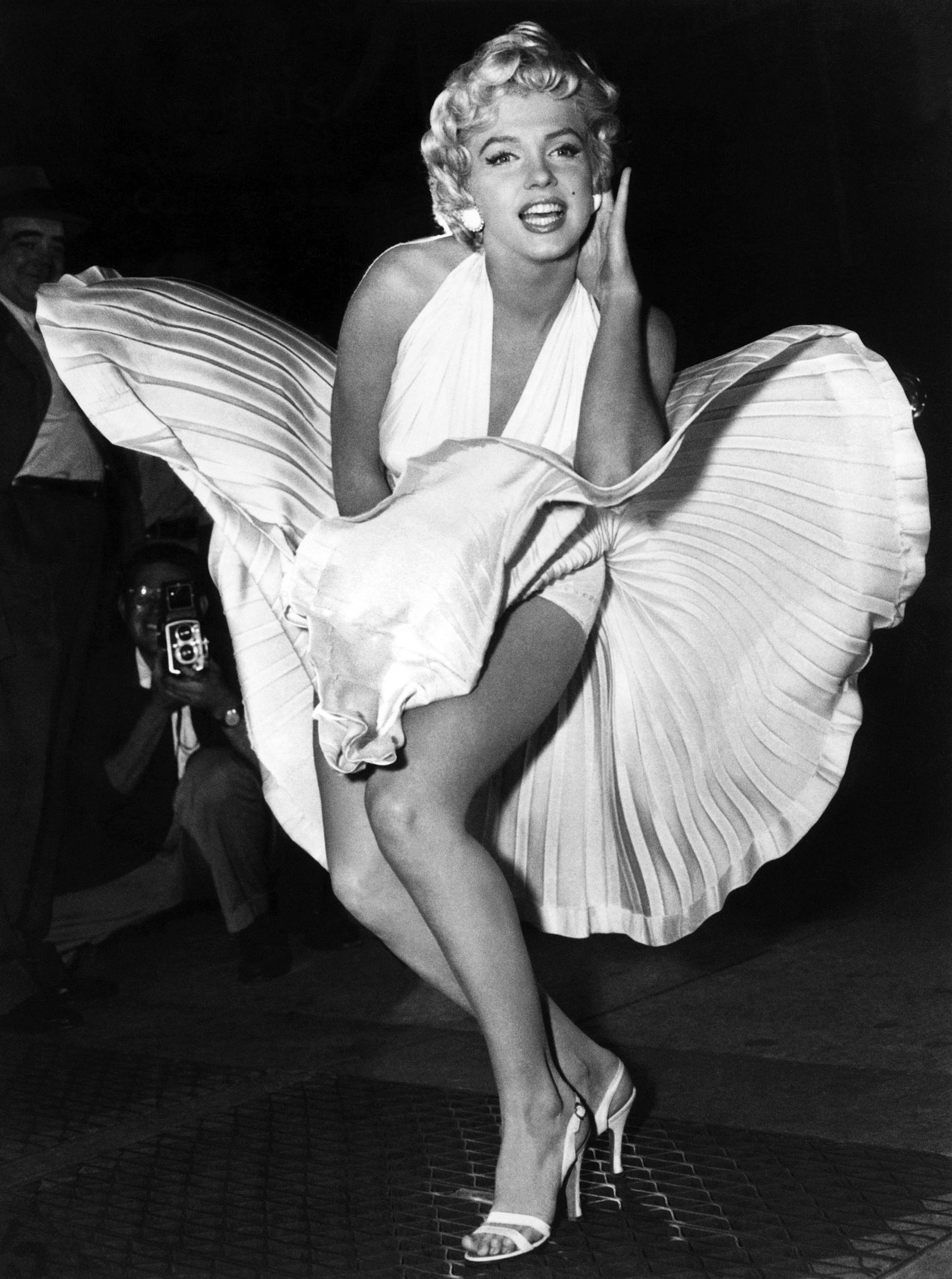
Marilyn Monroe wearing the white halterneck dress famously recognized in Billy Wilder's film "Seven Year Itch."

=== 1940s - 1950s ===
While the halterneck gained recognition in the 1930s, the halterneck found much more fame once Hollywood brought it to a mass audience. The growth of this popularity was largely due to the halterneck's association with sensuality and glamour in film. It additionally provided a practical and aesthetic appeal to swimwear and eveningwear for maximizing sun exposure.

The moment that the halterneck became the most culturally significant was in 1955. In 1955, famous actress Marilyn Monroe wore her famous white dress in Billy Wilder's film "The Seven Year Itch." The famous shot displays Monroe on a sidewalk wearing a white dress with a halterneck as it blows with the wind. Not only was this shot one of the most influential moments in film history, but it is now recognized to many as Monroe's most famous outfit. The dress later sold at an auction in 2011 for more than $5 million.

=== 1960s - 1970s ===
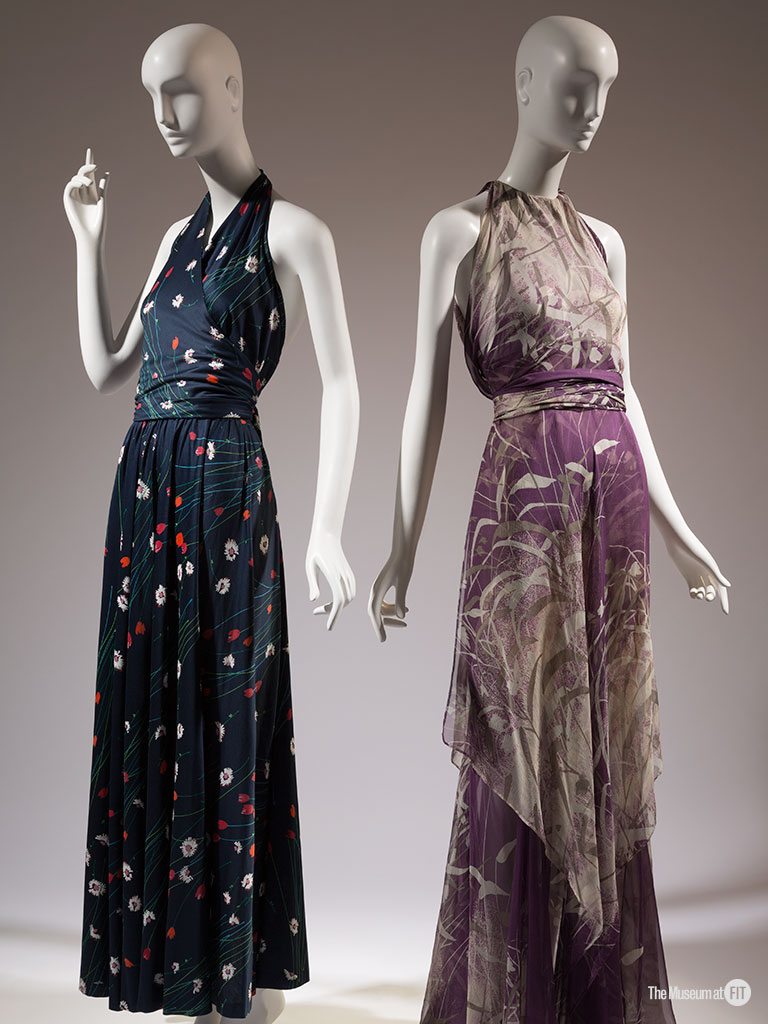
The left dress is printed knit cotton and was created by Halston in 1976. The right dress is a printed silk chiffon created by Yves Saint Laurent in France during spring 1971.

The 1960s and the 1970s both saw social culture change drastically. With this, the halterneck adapted to the ever-changing style and culture. The halterneck took on new meanings with the overall rise of the women's rights movement and youth culture. Both of these movements embodied the importance of rejecting restrictive undergarments and traditional dress expectations. Due to the halterneck's comfortable, bare and minimal style, the halterneck provided agency to women that brought stronger freedom and bodily autonomy. Additionally, this period of time heavily embraced doing things yourself and creating your own clothes. The halterneck allowed for easy construction that could also allow for creative embrace, paralleling with the counterculture value of the time period.

In the 1970s, one designer in particular heavily propelled the popularity of halternecks further. Roy Halston Frowick, better known as simply Halston, was one of the most impactful designers in 20th century America. Halston was known for creating the notable matte jersey halter dress, which was one of the most prevalent silhouettes in fashion during the 1970s. Halston's halter dress grew to be a pivotal fashion item during the disco era, with the style previously worn by Marlene Dietrich, Lauren Bacall and Bianca Jagger. These celebrities embracing Halston's halter dress gave Halston and his fashion more notice and recognition.

Halston specifically approached the halterneck wanting to showcase historical relevance while additionally embracing modern practicality. Halston was inspired by 1930s swimwear, hoping to expand the halterneck's presence further into the ballroom and other formal events.

=== 1980s ===
In general fashion the 1980s were known for taking risks and boldly experimenting through aesthetic. This decade came with embracing aesthetics like metallic, neon and whimsical silhouettes. One main cultural factor that determined the fashion aesthetic was athleticism. Exercise culture heavily determined the fashion norms because of how prevalent exercising was in the 1980s.

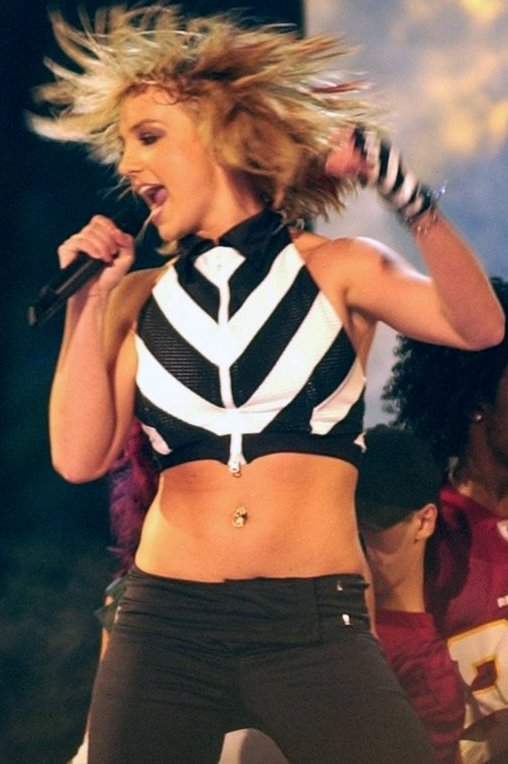
Britney Spears performs at the National Mall in 2003 while wearing a halterneck top.

This is where the halterneck style comes in. Halternecks were heavily seen in the 1980s through athletic clothing. As programs like Jazzercise, aerobics and yoga became more popular, halternecks were seen more in these fitness realms. Because of the open back of halternecks, the style provided not only a chic look but also allowed for breathability. This combination of fashion and comfort made halternecks a pivotal style choice in 1980s athletic wear.

=== 1990s - 2000s ===
While there was not major relevance for halternecks outside of athletic wear in the 1980s, this heavily changed in the 1990s and 2000s. Halternecks became mainstream and received high praise in pop culture. This mainly came from celebrities starting to wear halternecks again, specifically Mariah Carey and Britney Spears. Christina Aguilera also became known for wearing halternecks, specifically the twisted halter top style.

Not only did halternecks make big waves in music, but halternecks made their stamp in traditional fashion culture. Many major fashion houses started to incorporate halternecks into their runway shows. Miu Miu, Versace and Gucci all used halternecks in many of their iconic fashion lines of the late 1990s and early 2000s.

== See also ==
- Apron
- Yếm
- Backless dress
- Dudou
