= Keir Hardie =

Scottish socialist and founder of the British Labour Party (1856–1915)

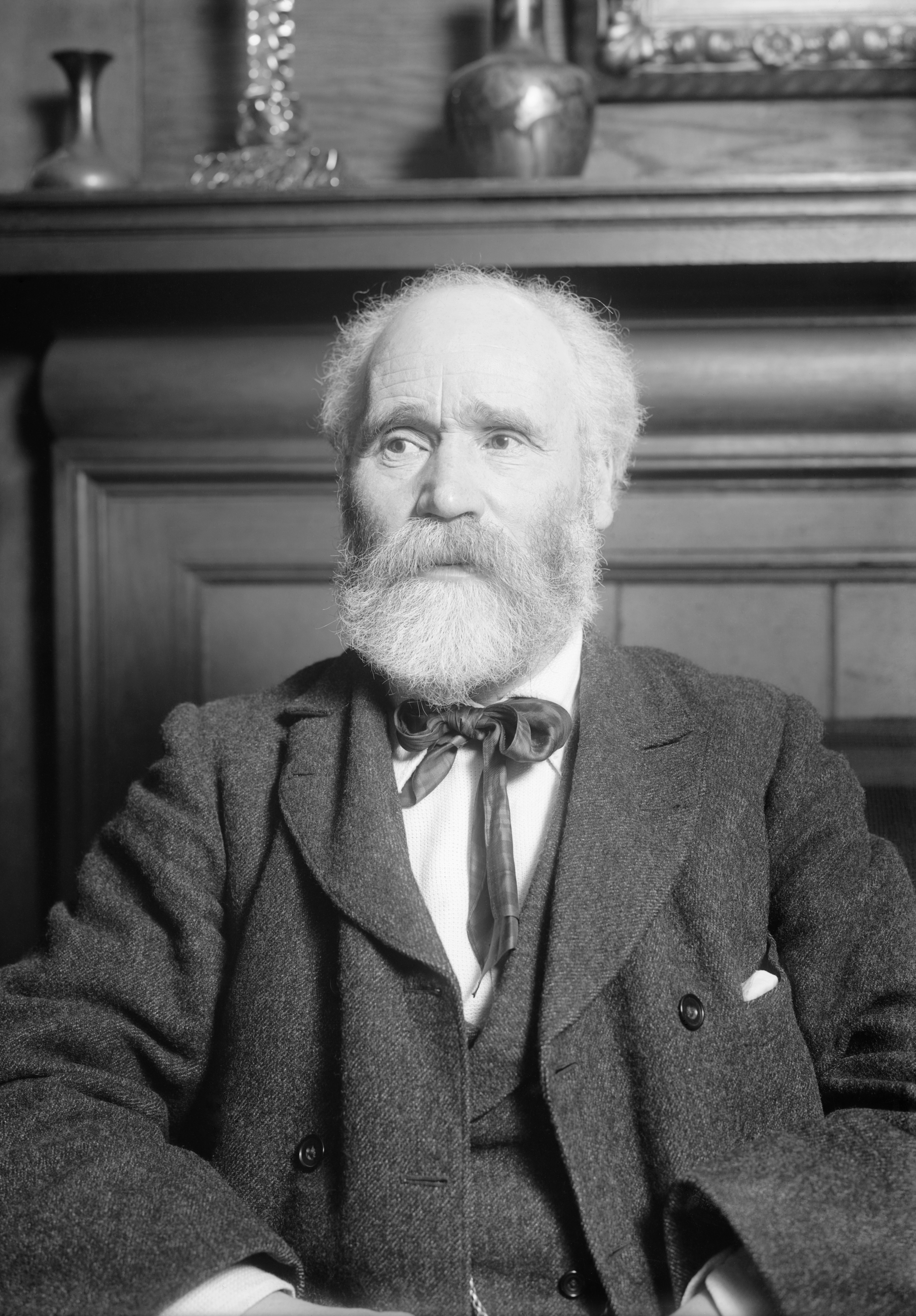
- Hardie in 1909 by George Grantham Bain

Leader of the Labour Party
- In office 17 January 1906 – 22 January 1908
- Chief Whip: David Shackleton; Arthur Henderson; George Henry Roberts
- Preceded by: Office established
- Succeeded by: Arthur Henderson

Member of Parliament for Merthyr Tydfil
- In office 24 October 1900 – 26 September 1915 Serving with Edgar Rees Jones (1910–1915)
- Preceded by: William Pritchard Morgan
- Succeeded by: Charles Stanton

Member of Parliament for West Ham South
- In office 26 July 1892 – 7 August 1895
- Preceded by: George Banes
- Succeeded by: George Banes

Personal details
- Born: James Keir Hardie; 15 August 1856 Newhouse, Lanarkshire, Scotland
- Died: 26 September 1915 (aged 59) Glasgow, Lanarkshire, Scotland
- Party: Labour
- Other political affiliations: Scottish Labour; Independent Labour
- Spouse: Lillias Balfour Wilson (m. 1880)
- Children: 4

James Keir Hardie (15 August 1856 – 26 September 1915) was a Scottish trade unionist and politician. He was a founder of the Labour Party, and was its first parliamentary leader from 1906 to 1908.

Hardie was born in Legbrannock, Newhouse, Lanarkshire. He started working at the age of seven, and from the age of ten worked in the Lanarkshire coal mines. With a background in preaching, he became known as a talented public speaker and was chosen as a spokesman for his fellow miners. In 1879, Hardie was elected leader of a miners' union in Hamilton and organised a National Conference of Miners in Dunfermline. He subsequently led miners' strikes in Lanarkshire (1880) and Ayrshire (1881). He turned to journalism to make ends meet, and from 1886 was a full-time union organiser as secretary of the Ayrshire Miners' Union.

Hardie initially supported William Gladstone's Liberal Party, but later concluded that the working-class needed its own party. He first stood for Parliament in 1888 as an independent, and later that year helped form the Scottish Labour Party. Hardie won the English seat of West Ham South as an independent candidate at the 1892 general election, and helped to form the Independent Labour Party (ILP) the following year. He lost his seat in 1895, but was re-elected to Parliament in 1900 for Merthyr Tydfil in South Wales. During the same year, he helped to form the union-based Labour Representation Committee, which was later renamed the Labour Party.

After the 1906 general election, Hardie was chosen as the Labour Party's first parliamentary leader. He resigned in 1908 in favour of Arthur Henderson, and spent his remaining years campaigning for causes such as women's suffrage, self-rule for India, and opposition to World War I. He died in 1915 while attempting to organise a pacifist general strike. Hardie is seen as a key figure in the history of the Labour Party and has been the subject of multiple biographies. Kenneth O. Morgan has called him "Labour's greatest pioneer and its greatest hero".

== Early life ==
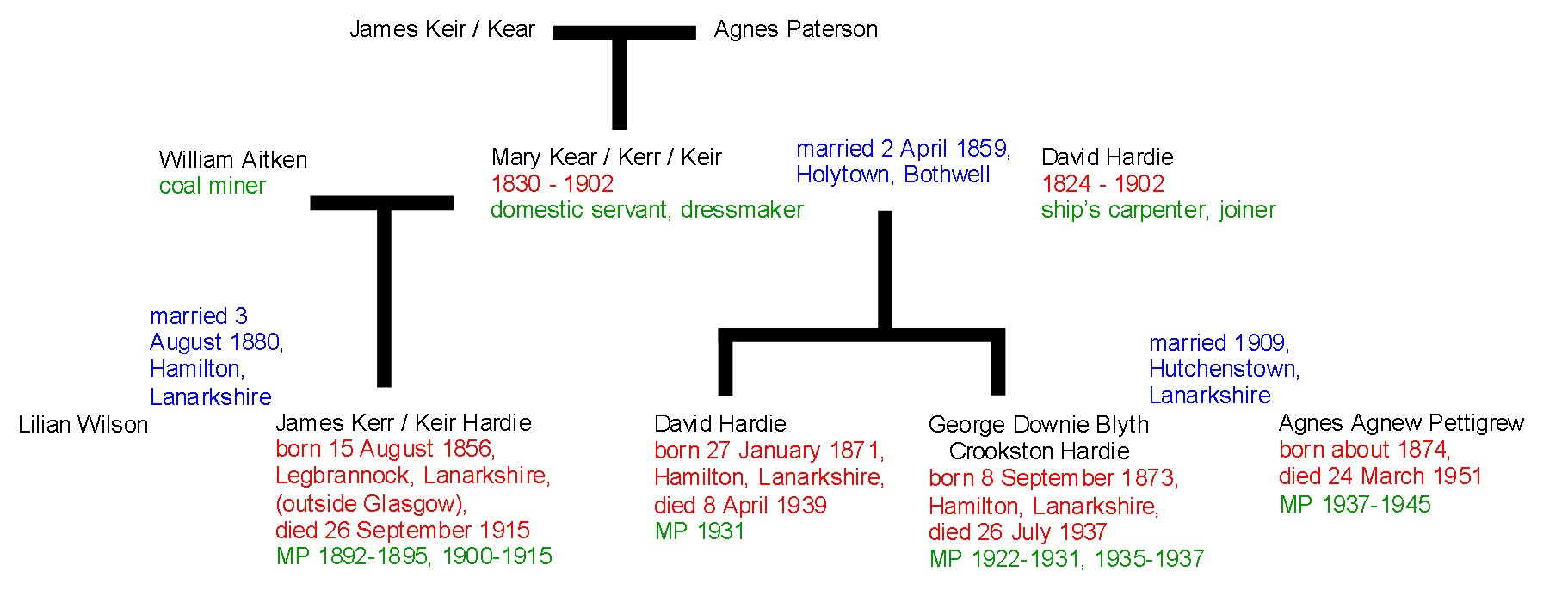
Hardie's family tree

James Keir Hardie was born on 15 August 1856 in a two-roomed cottage on the western edge of Newhouse, Lanarkshire near Holytown, a small town between Airdrie and Motherwell in Scotland. His mother, Mary Keir, was a domestic servant and his stepfather, David Hardie, was a ship's carpenter. Hardie had little or no contact with his biological father, a miner from Lanarkshire named William Aitken. The growing family soon moved to the shipbuilding burgh of Govan near Glasgow (which wasn't incorporated into the city until 1912), where they made a life in a very difficult financial situation, with his stepfather attempting to maintain continuous employment in the shipyards rather than practising his trade at sea – never an easy proposition given the boom-and-bust cycle of the industry.

Hardie's first job, when aged seven, was as a message boy for the Anchor Line Steamship Company. Formal schooling henceforth became impossible, but his parents spent evenings teaching him to read and write, skills which proved essential for future self-education. A series of low-paying entry-level jobs followed for the boy, including work as an apprentice in a brass-fitting shop, work for a lithographer, employment in the shipyards heating rivets, and time spent as a message boy for a baker for which he earned four shillings and sixpence a week.

A great lockout of the Clydeside shipworkers took place in which the unionised workers were sent home for six months. With their main source of income terminated, the family was forced to sell all their possessions to pay for food, with Hardie's meagre earnings the only remaining source of income for the household. One sibling took ill and died in the miserable conditions which followed, while the pregnancy of his mother limited her ability to work. Making matters worse, young James lost his job for turning up late on two occasions. In desperation, his stepfather returned to work at sea, while his mother moved from Glasgow to Newarthill, where his maternal grandmother still lived.

At the age of ten years old, Hardie went to work in the mines as a "trapper", opening and closing a door for a ten-hour shift to maintain the air supply for miners in a given section. Hardie also began to attend night school in Holytown at this time.

Hardie's stepfather returned from sea and went to work on a railway line being constructed between Edinburgh and Glasgow. When this job was completed, the family moved to the village of Quarter, Lanarkshire, where Hardie went to work as a pony driver at the mines, later working his way into the pits as a hewer. He also worked for two years above ground in the quarries. Around this time he encountered Thomas Carlyle's Sartor Resartus, which he read until "the spirit of it somewhat entered into me". This was an early and enduring influence on his radicalism and pacifism. By the time he was twenty, he had become a skilled practical miner.

"Keir", as he was now called, longed for a life outside the mines. To that end, encouraged by his mother, he learned to read and write in shorthand. He also began to associate with the Evangelical Union becoming a member of the Evangelical Union Church, Park Street, Hamilton – now the United Reformed Church, Hamilton – and to participate in the Temperance movement. Hardie's avocation of preaching put him before crowds of his fellows, helping him to learn the art of public speaking. Before long, Hardie was looked to by other miners as a logical chairman for their meetings and spokesman for their grievances. Mine owners began to see him as an agitator and in fairly short order, he and two younger brothers were blacklisted from working in the local mining industry.

== Union leader ==
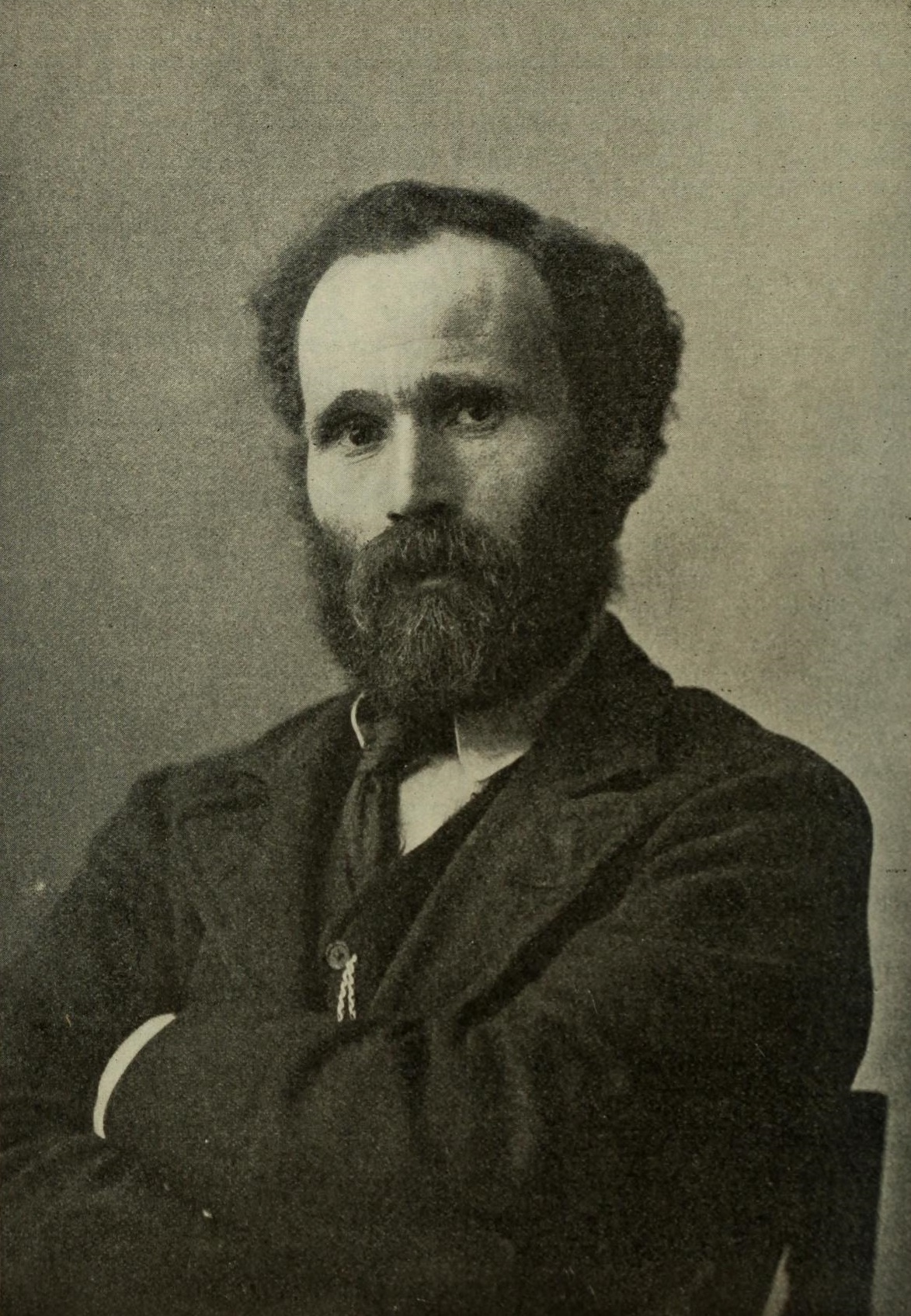
Hardie as a young man

When he was 23 years old, Hardie moved from the coal mines to union organisation work. In May 1879, Scottish mine owners combined to force a reduction of wages, which had the effect of spurring the demand for unionisation. Huge meetings were held weekly at Hamilton as mine workers joined to vent their grievances. On 3 July 1879, Hardie was appointed Corresponding Secretary of the miners, a post which gave him opportunity to get in touch with other representatives of the mine workers throughout southern Scotland. Three weeks later, Hardie was chosen by the miners as their delegate to a National Conference of Miners to be held in Glasgow. He was appointed Miners' Agent in August 1879 and his new career as a trade union organiser and functionary was launched.

On 16 October 1879, Hardie attended a National Conference of miners at Dunfermline, at which he was selected as National Secretary, a high-sounding title which preceded the establishment of a coherent national organisation by several years. Hardie was active in the strike wave which swept the region in 1880, including a generalised strike of the mines of Lanarkshire that summer which lasted six weeks. The fledgling union had no money but worked to gather foodstuffs for striking mine families, as Hardie and other union agents got local merchants to supply goods upon promise of future payment. Hardie and his wife, Lillie Wilson, ran a soup kitchen from their home during the strike.

While the Lanarkshire mine strike was a failure, Hardie's energy and activity shone and he accepted a call from Ayrshire to relocate there to organise the local miners. The young couple moved to the town of Cumnock, where Keir set to work organising a union of local miners, a process which occupied nearly a year.

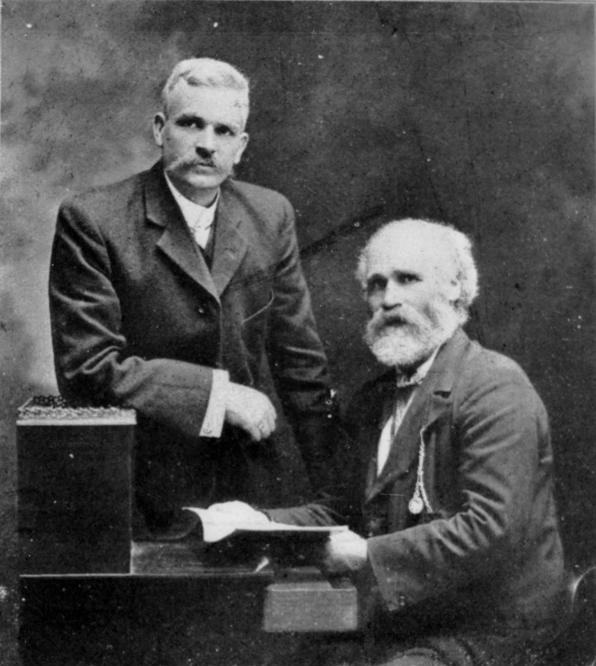
Hardie with Andrew Fisher, leader of the Australian Labor Party, in 1907. The two first met as young men during the 1881 Ayrshire coal miners' strike.

In August 1881, Ayrshire miners put forward the demand for a 10 per cent increase in wages, a proposition summarily refused by the region's mine owners. Despite the lack of funds for strike pay, a stoppage was called and a 10-week shutdown of the region's mines ensued. This strike also was formally a failure, with miners returning to work before their demands had been met, but not long after the return wages were escalated across the board by the mine owners, fearful of future labour actions. One of the other leaders of the strike was 19-year-old miner Andrew Fisher, who decades later would become leader of the Australian Labor Party and Prime Minister of Australia. He and Hardie met regularly to discuss politics when they both lived in Ayrshire and would renew their acquaintance on several occasions later in life.

To make ends meet, Hardie turned to journalism, starting to write for the local newspaper, the Cumnock News, a paper loyal to the pro-labour Liberal Party, after which, Hardie joined the Liberal Association, in which he was active. He also continued his temperance work as an active member of the local Good Templar's Lodge.

In August 1886, Hardie's ongoing efforts to build a powerful union of Scottish miners were rewarded when there was formed the Ayrshire Miners Union. Hardie was named Organising Secretary of the new union, drawing a salary of £75 per year.

In 1887, Hardie launched a new publication called The Miner.

== Scottish Labour Party ==
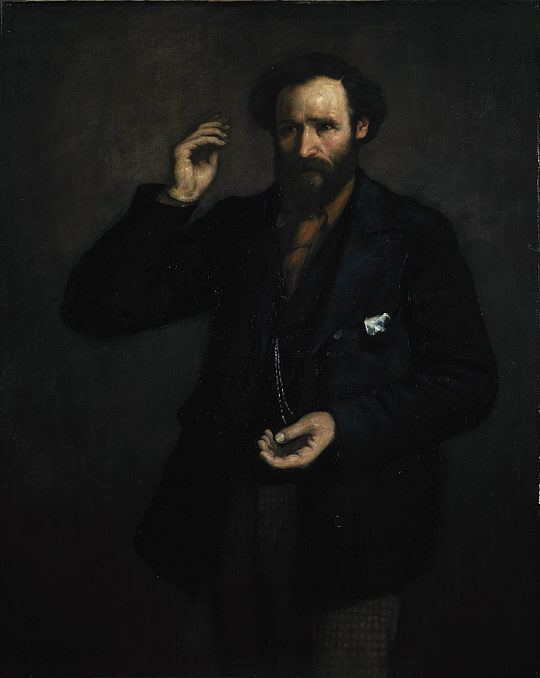
Portrait of Hardie painted in 1893 by Scottish artist Henry John Dobson

Hardie was a dedicated Georgist for a number of years and a member of the Scottish Land Restoration League. It was "through the single tax" on land monopoly that Hardie gradually became a Fabian socialist. He reasoned that "whatever the idea may be, State socialism is necessary as a stage in the development of the ideal." Despite his early support of the Liberal Party, Hardie became disillusioned by William Ewart Gladstone's economic policies and began to feel that the Liberals would not advocate the interests of the working class. Hardie concluded that the Liberal Party wanted the worker's votes without in return the radical reform he believed to be crucial – he stood for Parliament.

In April 1888, Hardie was an Independent Labour candidate at the Mid Lanarkshire by-election, finishing last behind the Liberal and Conservative candidates. At a public meeting in Glasgow on 25 August 1888 the Scottish Labour Party (a different party from the 1994-created Scottish Labour Party) was founded, with Hardie becoming the party's first secretary. The party's president was Robert Bontine Cunninghame Graham, the first socialist MP, and later founder of the National Party of Scotland, forerunner to the Scottish National Party.

== MP for West Ham South ==
Hardie was invited to stand in West Ham South in 1892, a working-class seat in Essex (now Greater London). The Liberals decided not to field a candidate, but at the same time not to offer Hardie any assistance. Competing against the Conservative Party candidate, Major George Banes, Hardie won by 5,268 votes to 4,036. He was variously described as the Labour or "Liberal and Labour" candidate.

Upon taking his seat on 3 August 1892, Hardie refused to wear the "parliamentary uniform" of black frock coat, black silk top hat and starched wing collar that other working-class MPs wore. Instead, Hardie wore a plain tweed suit, a red tie and a deerstalker hat. Although the deerstalker was the correct and matching apparel for his suit, he was nevertheless lambasted in the press, and was accused of wearing a flat cap, headgear associated with the common working man; a "cloth cap in Parliament".

In Parliament, Hardie advocated a graduated income tax, free schooling, pensions, the abolition of the House of Lords and for women's right to vote.

== Independent Labour Party ==
An election advertisement for Hardie in 1895

In 1893, Hardie and others formed the Independent Labour Party, an action that worried the Liberals, who were afraid that the ILP might, at some point in the future, win the working-class votes that they traditionally received.

Hardie hit the headlines in 1894, when after an explosion at the Albion Colliery in Cilfynydd near Pontypridd which killed 251 miners, he asked that a message of condolence to the relatives of the victims be added to an address of congratulations on the birth of a royal heir (the future Edward VIII). The request was refused and Hardie made a speech in the House of Commons attacking the monarchy, which almost predicted the nature of the future king's marriage that led to his abdication.

From his childhood onward this boy will be surrounded by sycophants and flatterers by the score—[Cries of 'Oh, oh!’]—and will be taught to believe himself as of a superior creation. [Cries of 'Oh, oh!’] A line will be drawn between him and the people whom he is to be called upon some day to reign over. In due course, following the precedent which has already been set, he will be sent on a tour round the world, and probably rumours of a morganatic alliance will follow—[Loud cries of 'Oh, oh!’ and 'Order!’]—and the end of it all will be that the country will be called upon to pay the bill. [Cries of Divide!]

This speech was highly controversial and contributed to the loss of his seat in 1895.

== Labour Party ==
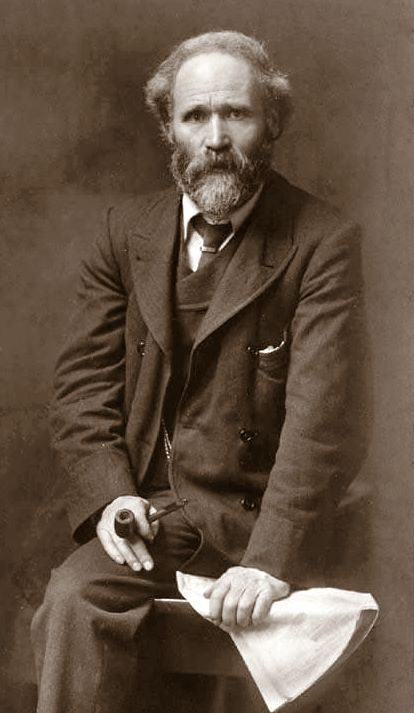
Hardie in 1902

Hardie spent the next five years of his life building up the Labour movement and speaking at various public meetings; he was arrested at a woman's suffrage meeting in London, but the Home Secretary, concerned about arresting the leader of the ILP, ordered his release.

In 1900 Hardie organised a meeting of various trade unions and socialist groups; they agreed to form a Labour Representation Committee, which would become the Labour Party. In the general election later that year Hardie, representing Labour, was elected as the junior MP for the dual-member constituency of Merthyr Tydfil in the South Wales Valleys, which he would represent for the remainder of his life. One other Labour candidate, Richard Bell, was elected (for Derby).

Meanwhile, the Conservative and Liberal Unionist coalition government became deeply unpopular, and Liberal leader Henry Campbell-Bannerman was worried about possible vote-splitting across the Labour and Liberal parties in the next election. A deal was struck in 1903, which became known as the Lib-Lab pact of 1903 or Gladstone-MacDonald pact. It was engineered by Ramsay MacDonald and Liberal Chief Whip Herbert Gladstone: the Liberals would not stand against Labour in thirty constituencies in the next election, in order to avoid splitting the anti-Conservative vote.

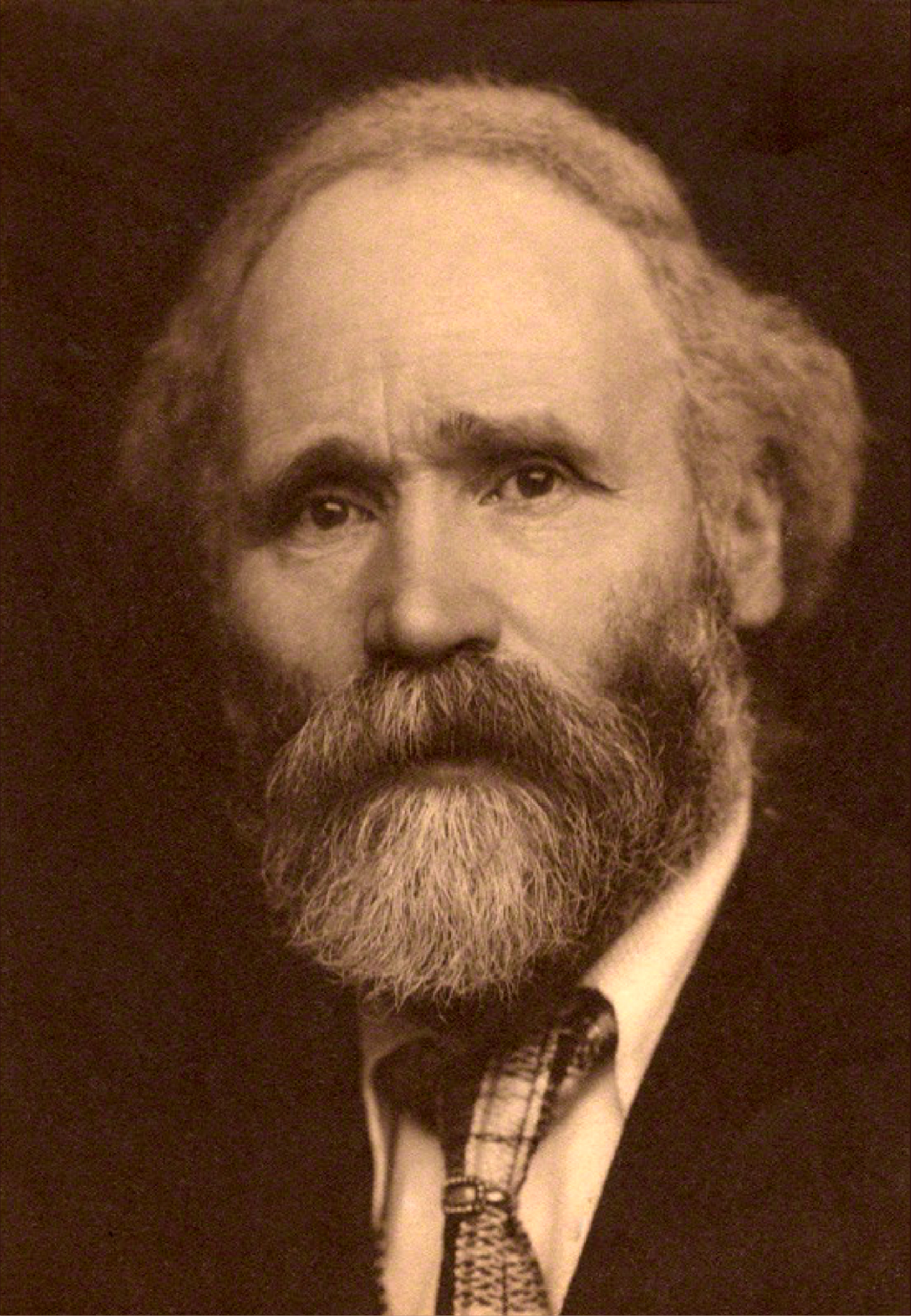
Hardie in 1905 by G. C. Beresford

In 1905 Hardie served as an LRC election agent for William Walker who came close to victory with 48.5% of the vote in Belfast North. Despite his own support for Irish home rule, Hardie, who made repeated visits, appeared determined to treat Belfast as a "typical British city", confident that class politics could surmount sectarian division over the constitutional question.

In 1906, the LRC changed its name to the "Labour Party". That year, the newly established Liberal government of Sir Henry Campbell-Bannerman called a general election The Liberals won in one of the biggest landslide victories in British history, sweeping the Conservatives (and their Liberal Unionist allies) out of what were regarded as safe seats. Conservative leader and former Prime Minister, Arthur Balfour, lost his seat, Manchester East, on a swing of over 20 per cent. 29 Labour MPs were elected; Hardie was elected as their Parliamentary leader.

In January 1907 at the Labour Party's first annual conference, held in Belfast, Hardie helped raise the issue of whether sovereignty lay with the annual conference, as in the inherited tradition of trade union democracy, or with the Parliamentary Labour Party (PLP). In the closing session he shocked the delegates by threatening to resign from the PLP over an amendment to a resolution on equal suffrage for women that would have bound him as an MP to oppose any compromise legislation that would extend votes to women on the basis of the existing property franchise. This, he saw, as potentially delaying the extension of "citizenship" to women on which he spoke passionately:

I thought the days of my pioneering were over but of late I have felt, with increasing intensity, the injustice inflicted on women by our present laws. The Party is largely my own child and I cannot part from it lightly, or without pain; but at the same time I cannot sever myself from the principles I hold. If it is necessary for me to separate myself from what has been my life's work, I do so in order to remove the stigma resting upon our wives, mothers and sisters of being accounted unfit for citizenship.

The PLP defused the crisis by allowing Hardie to vote as he wished on the subject. The precedent became the basis of a "conscience clause" in its standing orders, and would be invoked by party leader Michael Foot in 1981 to argue that the will of the conference should not always bind the PLP.

Hardie, never good at dealing with internal dissension, did resign his chairmanship of the party the following year, 1908. He was replaced by Arthur Henderson.

Hardie in his evidence to the 1899 House of Commons Select Committee on emigration and immigration, argued that the Scots resented immigrants greatly and that they would want a total immigration ban. When it was pointed out to him that more people left Scotland than entered it, he replied, "It would be much better for Scotland if those 1,500 were compelled to remain there and let the foreigners be kept out... Dr Johnson said God made Scotland for Scotchmen, and I would keep it so." According to Hardie, the Lithuanian migrant workers in the mining industry had "filthy habits", they lived off "garlic and oil", and they were carriers of "the Black Death".

In 1908, when visiting South Africa, he said the Socialist movement stood for equal rights for every race but that "we do not say all races are equal; no one dreams of doing that". On return to the UK he stated his belief that black people should be given the opportunity to vote and to take a full part in society.

== Later career and death ==
After resigning the leadership of the party in 1908, Hardie devoted himself to campaigning for votes for women and developing a closer relationship with Sylvia Pankhurst. His secretary Margaret Symons Travers was the first woman to speak in the House of Commons when she tricked her way in on 13 October 1908.

He also campaigned for self-rule for India and an end to segregation in South Africa. During a visit to the United States in 1909, his criticism of sectarianism among American radicals caused intensified debate regarding the American Socialist Party possibly joining with the unions in a labour party.

A pacifist, Hardie was appalled by the First World War and along with socialists in other countries he tried to organise an international general strike to stop the war. His stance was not popular, even within the Labour Party, but he continued to address anti-war demonstrations across the country and to support conscientious objectors. After the outbreak of war, on 4 August 1914, Hardie's spirited anti-war speeches often received opposition in the form of loud heckling. Hardie was among many Scottish socialists, the likes of John MacLean and Willie Gallacher, who opposed the War and believed that working-class men fighting other working-class men only served the interests of capitalism.

Despite this, once the war had started Hardie seems to have resigned himself to the inevitability of pursuing it rather than stopping it immediately. In a full-page article in the Merthyr Pioneer on 28 November 1914, he wrote:

May I once again revert for a moment to the ILP pamphlets? None of them clamour for immediately stopping the war. That would be foolish in the extreme, until, at least, the Germans have been driven back across their own frontier, a consummation which, I fear, carries us forward through a long and dismal vista.

In the same article he also opposed accusations that he was unpatriotic by claiming that his meetings encouraged young men to enlist while those of his Liberal opponents did the opposite:

I have never said or written anything to dissuade our young men from enlisting; I know too well all there is at stake… If I can get the recruiting figures for Merthyr week by week, which I find a very difficult job, I hope by another week to be able to prove that whereas our Rink meeting gave a stimulus to recruiting, those meetings at the Drill Hall at which the Liberal member or the Liberal candidate spoke, had the exactly opposite effect. Judging by their speeches, they seem far more concerned about defeating me than about defeating the Kaiser.

After a series of strokes, Hardie died in a hospital in Glasgow of pneumonia at noon on 26 September 1915, aged 59. His friend and fellow pacifist Thomas Evan Nicholas (Niclas y Glais) delivered the sermon at Hardie's memorial service at Aberdare, in his constituency. He was cremated in Maryhill, Glasgow. A memorial stone in his honour is at Cumnock Cemetery Cumnock, Ayrshire, Scotland.

== Legacy ==
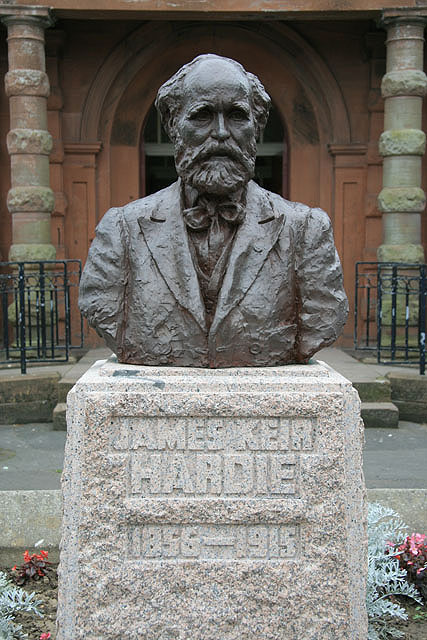
A bust of Hardie outside Cumnock Town Hall

On 2 December 2006, a memorial bust of Hardie was unveiled by Cynon Valley MP Ann Clwyd outside council offices in Aberdare (in his former constituency). The ceremony marked a centenary since the party's birth.

Hardie is still held in high esteem in his old home town of Holytown, where his childhood home is preserved for people to view, while the local sports centre was named in his own honour as "The Keir Hardie Sports Centre". Keir Hardie Memorial Primary School opened in 1956, named for him. There are now 40 streets throughout Britain named after Hardie. Alan Morrison has, in turn, used the title Keir Hardie Street for his 2010 narrative long poem in which a fictitious, turn-of-the-century, working-class poet discovers a socialist utopia off the dreamt-up Sea-Green Line of the London Underground.

One of the buildings at Swansea University is also named after him, while a main distributor road in Sunderland is named the Keir Hardie Way.

The Ellen Wilkinson Estate in Wardley, East Gateshead (once in the Urban District of Felling, subsumed by Gateshead Metropolitan Borough in 1974) has Keir Hardie Avenue as its main street. Every other street is named after a pre-1960 Labour MP. The England footballer, Chris Waddle, lived in Number 1 Keir Hardie Avenue, Gateshead, between 1971 and 1983.

The Keir Hardie Estate in Canning Town (Newham, East London) is named after him as a legacy to his tenure as MP for West Ham South, Newham. Keir Hardie Avenue in the town of Cleator Moor, Cumbria, has been named after him since 1934 Furthermore, an estate in the London Borough of Brent was also named after Hardie. Keir Hardie Crescent in Kilwinning in Scotland is named after him, as is a block of apartments in the Blackshots estate of Little Thurrock. There is also a Keir Hardie Street in Greenock and a Keir Hardie Street in Methil, Fife, a predominantly Labour stronghold. There is also a Hardie Street in West Dunbartonshire, amongst a range of streets named after famous socialist leaders or thinkers and Labour figures.

Ty Keir Hardie, in his constituency town of Merthyr Tydfil, housed offices for Merthyr Tydfil County Borough Council and adjoins the Civic Centre on Castle Street. In Merthyr Tydfil, there is also the Keir Hardie Health Park and the Keir Hardie Estate with streets named after prominent early Independent Labour leaders such as Wallhead and Glasier.

In recognition of his work as a lay preacher, the Keir Hardie Methodist Church in Newham, London bears his name.

There is a Keir Hardie Terrace in Dunfermline, Fife named after him as he helped the mining campaign for local mining families.

Labour founder Hardie has been voted the party's "greatest hero" in a straw poll of delegates at the 2008 Labour conference in Manchester. Labour peer Lord Morgan, Ed Balls, David Blunkett and Fiona Mactaggart argued the case for four Labour figures at a Guardian fringe meeting at the Labour conference 2008 in Manchester, 23 September 2008.

Hardie's younger half-brothers David Hardie, George Hardie and sister-in-law Agnes Hardie all became Labour Party Members of Parliament after his death. His daughter Nan Hardie and her husband Emrys Hughes both became Provost of Cumnock; Hughes also became Labour Member of Parliament for South Ayrshire in 1946.

Biographer Kenneth O. Morgan has sketched Hardie's personality:

I found him a man who was not only an idealistic crusader, but a pragmatist, anxious to work with radical Liberals whose ideology he largely shared, subtle in building up the Labour alliance with the trade unions and the other socialist bodies, and supremely flexible in his political philosophy, a very generalised socialism based on a secularised Christianity rather than Marxism. 'Socialists,' he proclaimed, 'made war on a system not a class'....He was no economist and was ill-informed on many issues, but he had uniquely the charisma and vision that any radical movement needs.

Keir Starmer, the former Prime Minister of the United Kingdom and Leader of the Labour Party was reportedly named after Hardie, though Starmer said in 2015 that he did not know whether this is true. Keir Mather, Labour MP for Selby (and its predecessor Selby and Ainsty), is also named after Hardie.

=== Keir Hardie Society ===
On 15 August 2010 (the 154th anniversary of Hardie's birth) the Keir Hardie Society was founded at Summerlee, Museum of Scottish Industrial Life. The society aims to "keep alive the ideas and promote the life and work of Keir Hardie". Among the co-founders was Cathy Jamieson, who at the time was the MSP for the constituency of Carrick, Cumnock and Doon Valley, which covers the area where Hardie lived most of his life. Scottish Labour leader Richard Leonard was the main founder of the society, along with Hugh Gaffney MP.

=== In other media ===
In August 2016, Jim Kenworth's play A Splotch of Red: Keir Hardie in West Ham was premiered at various venues in Newham, including Neighbours Hall in Canning Town at which Hardie spoke. The play deals with Hardie's battle to win the constituency of West Ham South. It was directed by James Martin Charlton; Samuel Caseley played Keir Hardie.

Hardie appears as a character in Howard Spring's 1940 novel, Fame Is the Spur, in which he gives advice and support to the main protagonists in the early days of the labour movement.

== Works ==
- From Serfdom to Socialism (1907)
- Karl Marx: The Man and His Message (1910)
- Hardie, Keir (1907). "Women and Politics" . The Case for Women's Suffrage: 78–83. Wikidata Q107177756 – via Wikisource.

== See also ==
- List of peace activists
- List of suffragists and suffragettes

Parliament of the United Kingdom
Preceded by George Banes	Member of Parliament for West Ham South; 1892–1895	Succeeded by George Banes
Preceded by William Pritchard-Morgan; D. A. Thomas	Member of Parliament for Merthyr Tydfil; 1900–1915; With: D. A. Thomas to 1910; Edgar Jones from 1910	Succeeded by Charles Stanton; Edgar Rees Jones
Political offices
New office	Chairman of the Independent Labour Party; 1894–1900	Succeeded by John Bruce Glasier
New office	Chairman of the British Labour Party; 1906–1908	Succeeded by Arthur Henderson
Preceded by William Anderson	Chairman of the Independent Labour Party; 1913–1914	Succeeded by Fred Jowett
Media offices
New office	Editor of the Labour Leader; 1888–1904	Succeeded by John Bruce Glasier
Trade union offices
New office	Secretary of the Ayrshire Miners' Union; 1886–1889	Succeeded by Peter Muir
