= James Laver =

English author, critic, art historian, and museum curator (1899–1975)

- James Laver (around 1950)
- Born: 14 March 1899; Liverpool, England
- Died: 3 June 1975 (aged 76); Blackheath, London, England
- Spouse(s): Veronica Turleigh (m. 1928–1971; her death); 2 children

James Laver, CBE, FRSA (14 March 1899 – 3 June 1975) was an English author, critic, art historian, and museum curator who acted as Keeper of Prints, Drawings and Paintings for the Victoria and Albert Museum between 1938 and 1959. He was also an important and pioneering fashion historian described as "the man in England who made the study of costume respectable".

== Early life ==
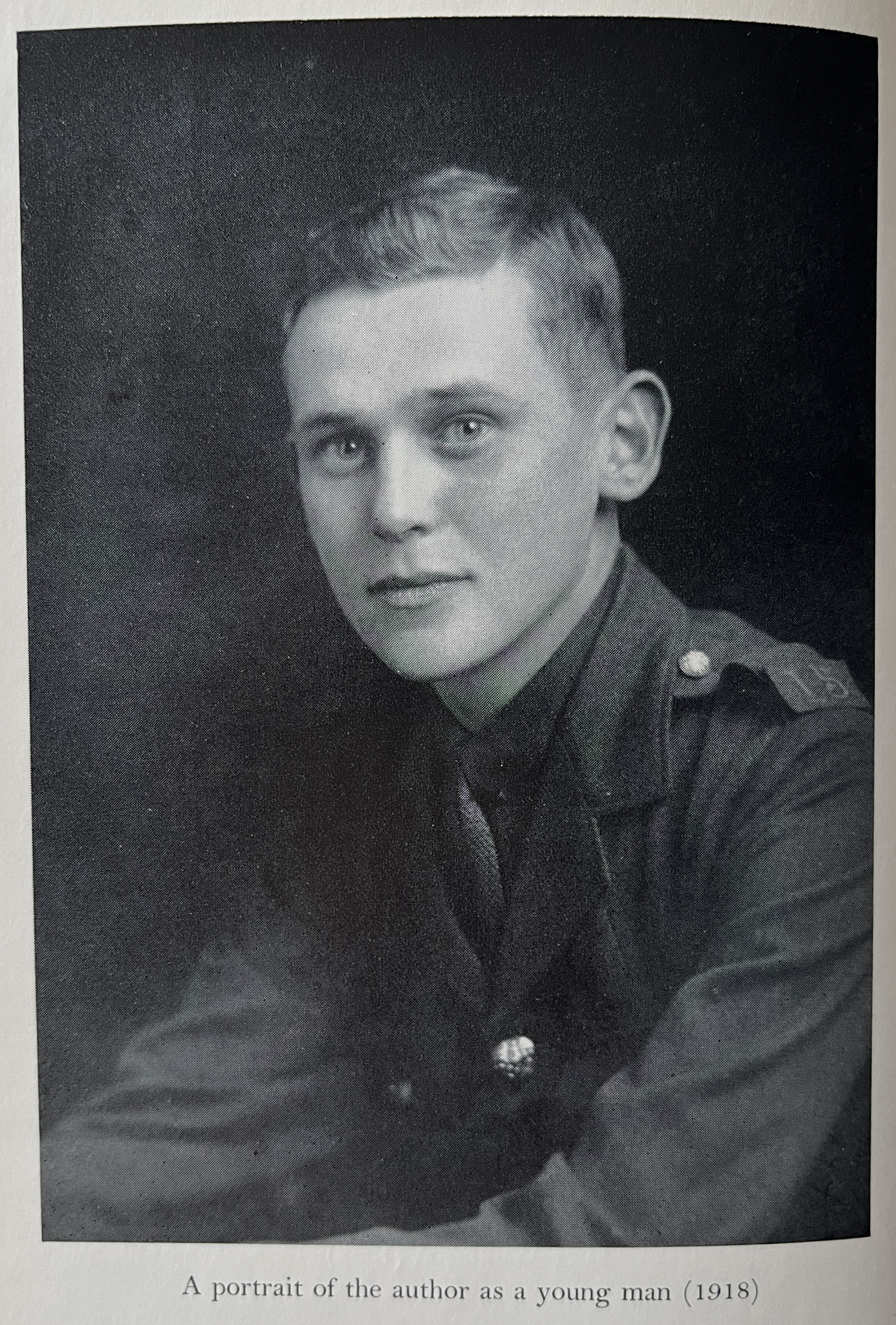
James Laver in 1918 from his 1964 autobiography 'Museum Piece - The Education of an Iconographer'.

James Laver was born in Liverpool, England, on 14 March 1899, the second child and only son of Arthur James Laver, a maritime printer and stationer, and his wife, Florence Mary (née Barker), strict Congregationalists who brought up their children in a puritanical manner. He attended the Liverpool Institute. His academic progress was put on hold by the First World War, in which he served as a second lieutenant.

In 1919 he resumed his residency at New College, Oxford, where he earned a BA degree second class in modern history 1921. The next year, he earned a B.Litt in theology for a thesis on John Wesley. His college fees and travel expenses were subsidised by a wealthy shipping magnate, Lawrence Holt. At Oxford, he contributed to the student magazine Isis and won the 1921 Newdigate Prize for his poem on Cervantes.

== Laver at the Victoria & Albert Museum ==
In 1922, Laver entered the Department of Engraving, Illustration, Design and Painting at the Victoria & Albert Museum where he worked under Martin Hardie. He arrived shortly before the International Theatre Exhibition was transferred to the V&A from Amsterdam and was shown as part of his department. It showcased work by all the leading European designers of the time, and the Museum purchased several designs and models, which became the basis of the Museum's Theatre Collection. Laver was put in charge of this collection. Stage design became one of his passions, possibly in reaction against his upbringing. In 1938 he succeeded Martin Hardie as Keeper of the department, a post he held until his retirement in 1958. Despite his significant contributions to object-centred dress history, he was never Keeper of Textiles for the Museum, or part of the Textiles section.

== Laver and fashion ==
Laver had an interest in fashion history, which emerged through a desire to date images accurately through the clothing depicted within. Laver defined the relationships between dress design and other applied arts, and discussed the influence of economic and social factors upon the development of fashionable taste. In 1962, Laver received a Neiman Marcus Fashion Award in recognition of his work in the field of fashion history. In 1937 Laver, with Pearl Binder, co-presented the first television programme to be dedicated to fashion history. Clothes-Line, a six-part series, was so successful that in 1938, Laver and Binder reunited to present a revised re-tread (in three parts) of the programme, this time called Clothes Through The Centuries.

Laver followed the theories of Thorstein Veblen and John Flügel, using them to develop his favourite theories. These were:

- Hierarchical Principle – dressing to indicate one's position in society
- Utility Principle – dressing for warmth and comfort
- Seduction Principle – dressing to attract the opposite sex.

In the 1980s and 1990s, feminist fashion historians such as Elizabeth Wilson and Amanda Vickery found these problematic, arguing that Laver and C. Willett Cunnington's views trivialised women's behaviour, role within the family, and their contributions to society and culture.

=== Laver's Law ===
Laver's Law was an attempt to compress the complex cycle of fashion change and the general attitude towards any certain style or period into a simple timeline. It first appeared in Taste and Fashion (1937):

Indecent	10 years before its time
Shameless	5 years before its time
Outré (Daring)	1 year before its time
Smart	Current fashion
Dowdy	1 year after its time
Hideous	10 years after its time
Ridiculous	20 years after its time
Amusing	30 years after its time
Quaint	50 years after its time
Charming	70 years after its time
Romantic	100 years after its time
Beautiful	150 years after its time

== Non-curatorial career ==
To supplement his pay whilst at the Victoria & Albert Museum, Laver dedicated his free time to writing magazine articles, book reviews, play translations, dramatic criticism and light verse. One of the plays he translated was Klabund's The Circle of Chalk from the original German.

His 1927 poem, A Stitch in Time, a pastiche of Alexander Pope's The Rape of the Lock set in modern times, successfully captured public attention, and led to Laver's popularity as a fashionable party guest. A sequel in 1929 followed, Love's Progress, the two poems being published together as Ladies' Mistakes in 1933.

In 1932 he published a novel, Nymph Errant, about a girl returning to her finishing school, who went astray along the way and ended up in a Turkish harem. It was an instant best-seller and in 1933, Charles B. Cochran turned it into a musical, Nymph Errant, featuring songs by Cole Porter and Gertrude Lawrence as the leading lady. Laver felt as if he was leading a double life. He once stated:

"To my colleagues at South Kensington I had become a cigar-smoking, Savoy-supping, enviable but slightly disreputable character, hobnobbing with chorus girls and hanging round stage doors. To Gertrude Lawrence and her friends I was something 'in a museum', engaged in mysterious and apparently useless activities quite outside their comprehension; a character out of The Old Curiosity Shop, hardly fit to be let out alone."

Laver continued to write fiction and work for the theatre and film on a less ambitious scale, but did not attempt becoming a full-time writer. His work on films included acting as historical advisor for The Amorous Adventures of Moll Flanders (1965) and The Amateur Gentleman (1936), and he co-wrote the screenplay for Warning to Wantons (1948). During the Second World War, he determined to read all the books on occultism in the London Library. As a result, he became an expert in the field, writing a book on the prophet Nostradamus.

Between 1926 and 1938, James Laver was the Director of Art Classes at the Working Men's College, Camden Town. He ran a course on English literature and also re-organised the art class, introducing live models.

== Marriage and family ==
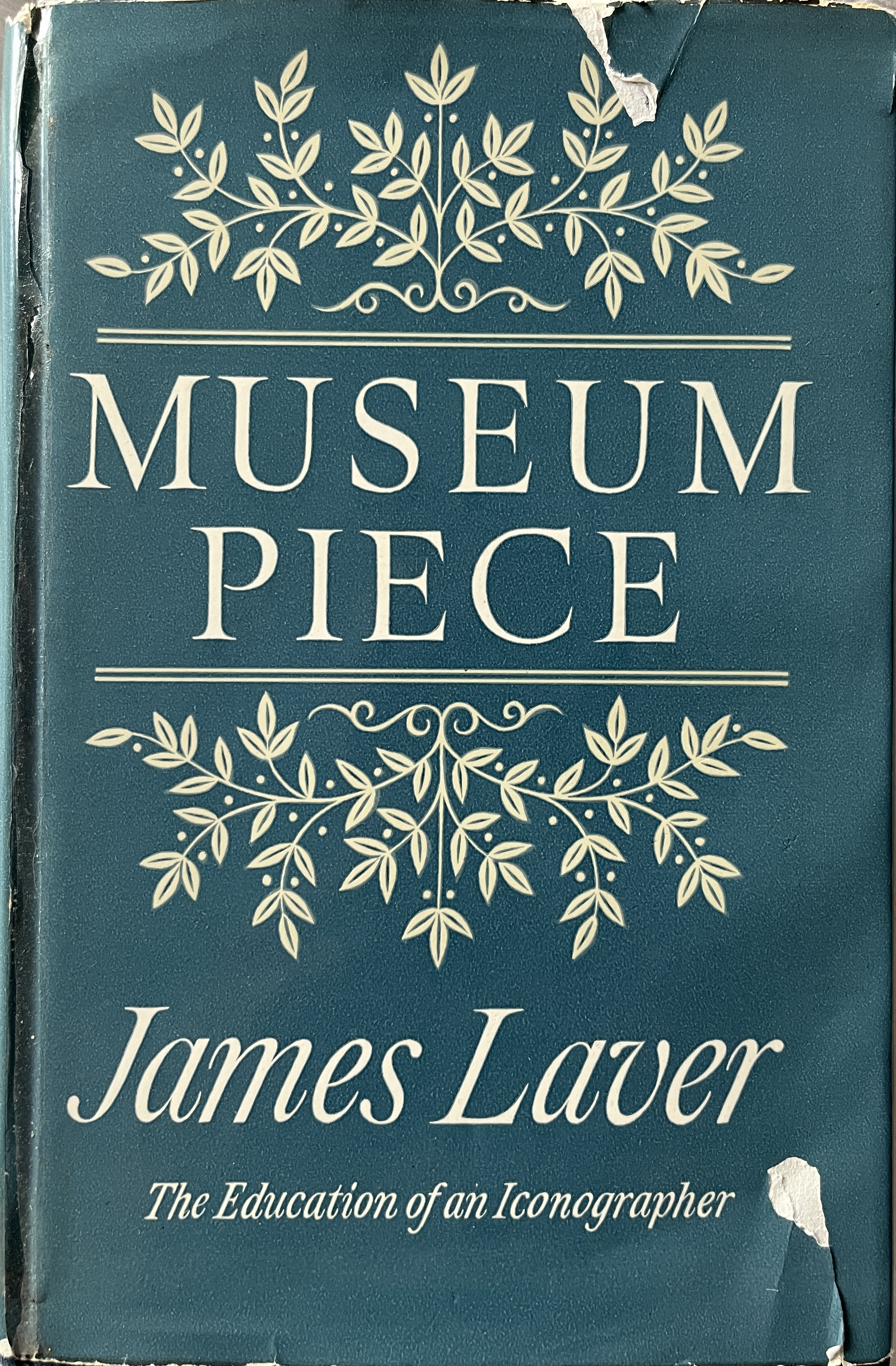
James Laver's autobiography 'Museum Piece - The Education of an Iconographer' - published 1964.

Laver married the Irish actress Veronica Turleigh (1903–1971), a Roman Catholic in 1928. The couple had two children, a son and a daughter. They first lived in a flat in Piccadilly, London, which proved convenient for their theatrical friends, and later moved to Chelsea.

== Death ==
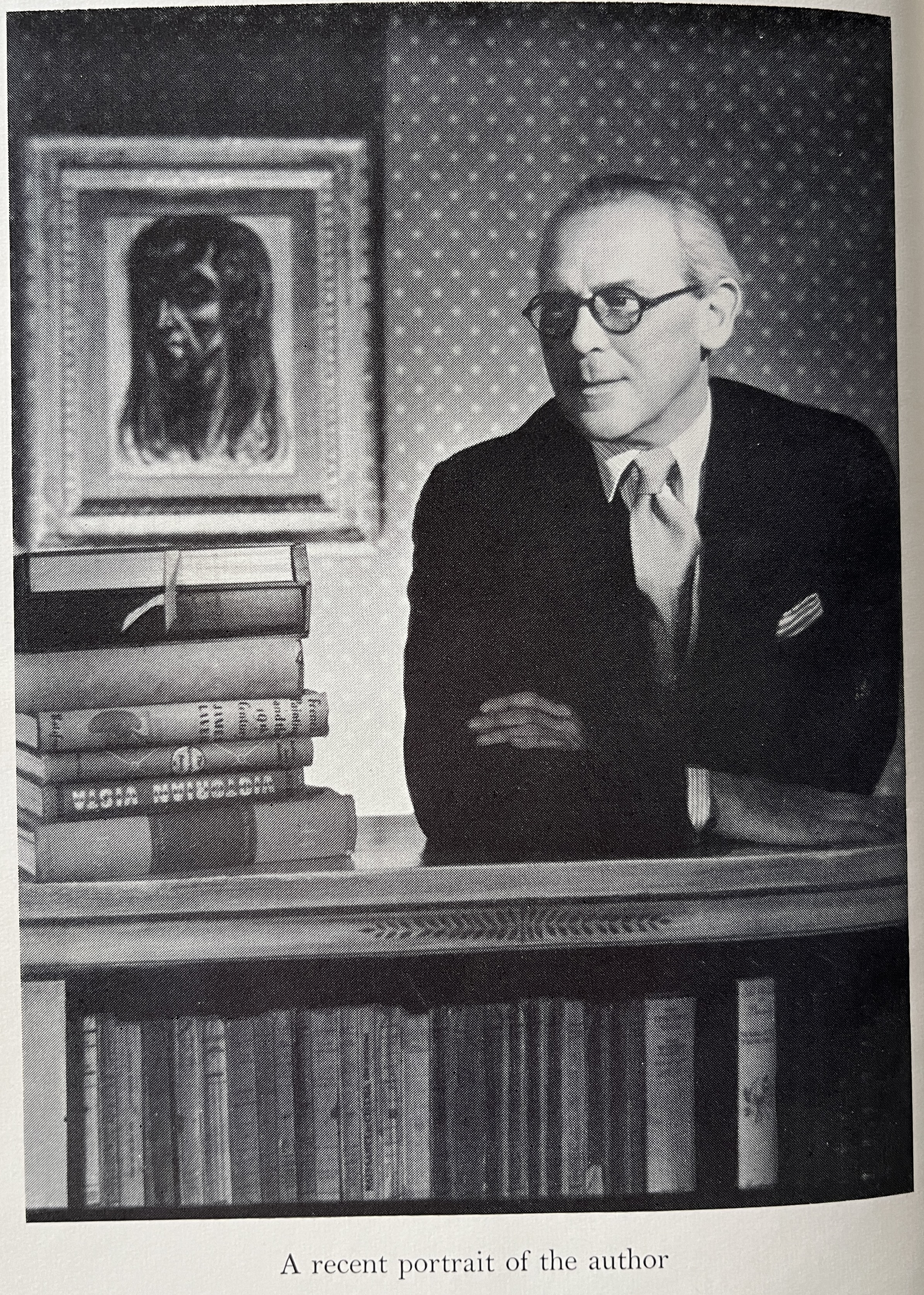
Portrait of James Laver from his 1964 autobiography 'Museum Piece - The Education of an Iconographer'.

Laver died on 3 June 1975 following a fire at his home in Blackheath, London.

== Select bibliography ==
=== Poetry ===
- Cervantes (1921)
- The Young Man Dances and Other Poems (1925)
- A Stitch in Time (1927)
- Love's Progress (1929)
- "Macrocosmos" Published by William Heinemann, London (1929) Limited edition of 775
- "Macrocosmos" Published by Alfred A. Knopf, New York (1930) Limited edition of 500
- Ladies' Mistakes (1933)

=== Fiction ===
- Nymph Errant (1933)
- Winter Wedding – A Decoration (1935)
- Background for Venus (1935)
- Panic Among Puritans (1936)

=== Art history ===
- Portraits in Oil and Vinegar (1925)
- A History of British and American Etching (1928)
- Whistler (1930)
- "Vulgar Society": The Romantic Career of James Tissot (1936)
- French Painting and the Nineteenth Century (1937)
- Adventures in Monochrome (1941)
- English Sporting Prints (Ward Lock Limited, London, 1970)

=== Fashion ===
- Taste and Fashion; from the French Revolution until today (1937)
- Fashions and Fashion Plates (1943)
- Style in Costume (1949)
- Clothes (Pleasures of Life Series) (1953)
- Dandies (Pageant of History) (1968)
- Modesty in Dress (1969)
- A Concise History of Costume ('The World of Art Library' series) (1968), revised and retitled Costume and Fashion: A Concise History (1995, 2003) ISBN 978-0-500-20348-4

=== Autobiography ===
- Museum Piece; or, The Education of an Iconographer (1964)

=== Other ===
- Design in the Theatre (with George Sheringham) (1927)
- Harriette Wilson's Memoirs of Herself and Others, ed. with a preface (1929) (London: Peter Davis)
- Nostradamus, or the Future Foretold (1942) ISBN 0704102021
- The First Decadent: Being the Strange Life of J. K. Huysmans (1954)
- Victorian Vista (1954)
- Edwardian Promenade (1958) (London: Edward Hulton)
- Victoriana (1966)
- Oscar Wilde (1968)
- The Age of Illusion, Manners and Morals 1750-1848, (1972) (New York: D. McKay Company)
