= West Ham South =

Parliamentary constituency in the United Kingdom, 1950–1974

- Former borough constituency for the House of Commons

1950–1974
- Seats: One
- Created from: Plaistow and Silvertown
- Replaced by: Newham South

1885–1918
- Seats: One
- Type of constituency: Borough constituency
- Created from: South Essex
- Replaced by: Plaistow and Silvertown

West Ham South was a parliamentary constituency in the County Borough of West Ham, in what was then Essex but is now Greater London. It returned one Member of Parliament (MP) to the House of Commons of the Parliament of the United Kingdom, elected by the first-past-the-post voting system.

== Boundaries ==
1950–1974: The County Borough of West Ham wards of Beckton Road, Bemersyde, Canning Town and Grange, Custom House and Silvertown, Hudsons, Ordnance, Plaistow, and Tidal Basin.

== History ==
The constituency was created under the Redistribution of Seats Act 1885 for the 1885 general election, and abolished for the 1918 general election.

It was re-established for the 1950 general election, and abolished again for the February 1974 general election.

== Members of Parliament ==
=== MPs 1885–1918 ===
| Election | Member | Party |
|---|---|---|
| 1885 | Joseph Leicester | Lib-Lab |
| 1886 | George Edward Banes | Conservative |
| 1892 | Keir Hardie | Independent Labour |
| 1893 | Keir Hardie | Independent Labour Party |
| 1895 | George Edward Banes | Conservative |
| 1906 | Will Thorne | Labour |
| 1918 | constituency abolished | |

=== MPs 1950–1974 ===
| Election | Member | Party |
|---|---|---|
| 1950 | Elwyn Jones | Labour |
| Feb 1974 | constituency abolished: see Newham South | |

== Election results ==
=== Elections in the 1880s ===
General election 1885: West Ham South
| Party | Candidate | Votes | % | ±% |
|---|---|---|---|---|
| Lib-Lab | Joseph Leicester | 3,527 | 58.1 | |
| Conservative | Alfred John Pound | 2,545 | 41.9 | |
| Majority | | 982 | 16.2 | |
| Turnout | | 6,072 | 67.9 | |
| Registered electors | | 8,942 | | |
| Lib-Lab win (new seat) | | | | |

General election 1886: West Ham South
| Party | Candidate | Votes | % | ±% |
|---|---|---|---|---|
| Conservative | George Edward Banes | 2,778 | 52.9 | +11.0 |
| Lib-Lab | Joseph Leicester | 2,472 | 47.1 | −11.0 |
| Majority | | 306 | 5.8 | N/A |
| Turnout | | 5,250 | 58.7 | −9.2 |
| Registered electors | | 8,942 | | |
| Conservative gain from Lib-Lab | | Swing | +11.0 | |

=== Elections in the 1890s ===

General election 1892: West Ham South
| Party | Candidate | Votes | % | ±% |
|---|---|---|---|---|
| Independent Labour | Keir Hardie | 5,268 | 56.6 | +9.5 |
| Conservative | George Edward Banes | 4,036 | 43.4 | −9.5 |
| Majority | | 1,232 | 13.2 | N/A |
| Turnout | | 9,304 | 59.8 | +1.1 |
| Registered electors | | 15,548 | | |
| Independent Labour gain from Conservative | | Swing | +9.5 | |

General election 1895: West Ham South
| Party | Candidate | Votes | % | ±% |
|---|---|---|---|---|
| Conservative | George Edward Banes | 4,750 | 54.4 | +11.0 |
| Ind. Labour Party | Keir Hardie | 3,975 | 45.6 | −11.0 |
| Majority | | 775 | 8.8 | N/A |
| Turnout | | 8,725 | 55.4 | −4.4 |
| Registered electors | | 15,745 | | |
| Conservative gain from Independent Labour | | Swing | +11.0 | |

=== Elections in the 1900s ===
General election 1900: West Ham South
| Party | Candidate | Votes | % | ±% |
|---|---|---|---|---|
| Conservative | George Edward Banes | 5,615 | 55.8 | +1.4 |
| Labour Repr. Cmte. | Will Thorne | 4,439 | 44.2 | −1.4 |
| Majority | | 1,176 | 11.6 | +2.8 |
| Turnout | | 10,054 | 51.2 | −4.2 |
| Registered electors | | 19,631 | | |
| Conservative hold | | Swing | +1.4 | |

Thorne

General election 1906: West Ham South
| Party | Candidate | Votes | % | ±% |
|---|---|---|---|---|
| Labour Repr. Cmte. | Will Thorne | 10,210 | 67.2 | +23.0 |
| Conservative | Sir John Gardiner Nutting, 1st Baronet | 4,973 | 32.8 | −23.0 |
| Majority | | 5,237 | 34.4 | N/A |
| Turnout | | 15,183 | 66.7 | +15.5 |
| Registered electors | | 22,753 | | |
| Labour Repr. Cmte. gain from Conservative | | Swing | +23.0 | |

=== Elections in the 1910s ===
General election, January 1910: West Ham South
| Party | Candidate | Votes | % | ±% |
|---|---|---|---|---|
| Labour | Will Thorne | 11,791 | 63.1 | −4.1 |
| Conservative | James Grimwood | 6,909 | 36.9 | +4.1 |
| Majority | | 4,882 | 26.2 | −8.2 |
| Turnout | | 18,700 | 70.1 | +3.4 |
| Labour hold | | Swing | -4.1 | |

General election, December 1910: West Ham South
| Party | Candidate | Votes | % | ±% |
|---|---|---|---|---|
| Labour | Will Thorne | 9,508 | 66.4 | +3.3 |
| Conservative | Thomas Walter Colby Carthew | 4,820 | 33.6 | −3.3 |
| Majority | | 4,688 | 32.8 | +6.6 |
| Turnout | | 14,328 | 53.7 | −16.4 |
| Labour hold | | Swing | +3.3 | |

=== Elections in the 1950s ===
General election 1950: West Ham South
| Party | Candidate | Votes | % | ±% |
|---|---|---|---|---|
| Labour | Elwyn Jones | 36,754 | 82.42 | |
| Conservative | Mabel de la Motte | 5,422 | 12.16 | |
| Liberal | Geoffrey George Young | 1,686 | 3.78 | |
| Communist | W Norris | 730 | 1.64 | |
| Majority | | 31,332 | 70.26 | |
| Turnout | | 44,592 | 77.89 | |
| Labour win (new seat) | | | | |

General election 1951: West Ham South
| Party | Candidate | Votes | % | ±% |
|---|---|---|---|---|
| Labour | Elwyn Jones | 37,195 | 84.96 | +2.54 |
| Conservative | Mabel de la Motte | 6,586 | 15.04 | +2.88 |
| Majority | | 30,609 | 69.92 | −0.34 |
| Turnout | | 43,781 | 77.31 | −0.58 |
| Labour hold | | Swing | -0.17 | |

General election 1955: West Ham South
| Party | Candidate | Votes | % | ±% |
|---|---|---|---|---|
| Labour | Elwyn Jones | 29,451 | 83.08 | −1.88 |
| Conservative | Elias J Emden | 5,997 | 16.92 | +1.88 |
| Majority | | 23,454 | 66.16 | −2.76 |
| Turnout | | 35,448 | 65.81 | −11.50 |
| Labour hold | | Swing | -1.88 | |

General election 1959: West Ham South
| Party | Candidate | Votes | % | ±% |
|---|---|---|---|---|
| Labour | Elwyn Jones | 28,017 | 75.26 | −7.82 |
| Conservative | Peter Goldman | 5,188 | 13.94 | −2.98 |
| Liberal | Oliver French | 4,020 | 10.80 | New |
| Majority | | 22,829 | 61.32 | −2.86 |
| Turnout | | 37,225 | 71.12 | +5.31 |
| Labour hold | | Swing | -2.42 | |

=== Elections in the 1960s ===
General election 1964: West Ham South
| Party | Candidate | Votes | % | ±% |
|---|---|---|---|---|
| Labour | Elwyn Jones | 23,599 | 74.45 | −0.81 |
| Liberal | Eugene Johnson | 4,264 | 13.45 | +2.65 |
| Conservative | Robert Mitchell | 3,835 | 12.10 | −1.84 |
| Majority | | 19,335 | 61.00 | −0.32 |
| Turnout | | 31,698 | 63.94 | −7.18 |
| Labour hold | | Swing | -1.73 | |

General election 1966: West Ham South
| Party | Candidate | Votes | % | ±% |
|---|---|---|---|---|
| Labour | Elwyn Jones | 22,902 | 77.17 | +2.72 |
| Conservative | Robert Mitchell | 3,410 | 11.49 | −0.61 |
| Liberal | Eugene Johnson | 3,367 | 11.34 | −2.11 |
| Majority | | 19,492 | 65.68 | +4.68 |
| Turnout | | 29,679 | 61.84 | −2.10 |
| Labour hold | | Swing | +1.67 | |

=== Elections in the 1970s ===
General election 1970: West Ham South
| Party | Candidate | Votes | % | ±% |
|---|---|---|---|---|
| Labour | Elwyn Jones | 18,899 | 77.71 | +0.54 |
| Conservative | Brian C Balcomb | 5,422 | 22.29 | +10.80 |
| Majority | | 13,477 | 55.42 | −10.26 |
| Turnout | | 24,321 | 48.84 | −13.00 |
| Labour hold | | Swing | -5.13 | |

== See also ==
- West Ham North, 1918–1950
