= George Banes =

Politician

Major George Edward Banes (2 February 1828 – 16 July 1907) was Conservative MP for West Ham South.

A wharfinger and bonded warehouse keeper, Banes founded the 3rd Essex Artillery Volunteers (later 1st Brigade Essex RA) in 1859 and retired in 1876 with the rank of major.

He was elected to Parliament for West Ham South in 1886, lost it to Keir Hardie in 1892, won it back from him in 1895, held it in 1900, but stood down in 1906.

== Sources ==
- Leigh Rayment's Historical List of MPs^{[usurped]}
- Craig, F.W.S. British Election Results 1885-1918
- Whitaker's Almanack, 1886 to 1910 editions
