= Pearl Binder =

British artist (1904–1990)

- Born: Pearl Binder; 28 June 1904; Salford, England
- Died: 25 January 1990 (aged 85); Brighton, England
- Spouse: Elwyn Jones, Baron Elwyn-Jones (m. 1937; died 1989)
- Relatives: Dan Jones (son)
- Education: Central School of Art and Design
- Known for: Writing, illustration

Pearl Binder (pronounced /ˈbaɪndə/; 28 June 1904 – 25 January 1990) was a British writer, illustrator, stained-glass artist, lithographer, sculptor and a champion of the Pearly Kings and Queens.

Binder was a well-known character who had a lifelong fascination with the East End of London, where she settled in the 1920s. In 1974, she became Lady Elwyn-Jones, when her husband, the politician and lawyer Elwyn Jones, was appointed Lord Chancellor and made a life peer, taking the title Baron Elwyn-Jones.

== Early life ==
Pearl "Polly" Binder was born in Salford in Greater Manchester. Her father was Jacob Binderevski, a Jewish tailor who came to Britain in 1890 and shortly afterwards became a British citizen. Her mother's name, origins and profession are not recorded in any of the artist's biographies.

== Career ==
Binder moved to London after the first world war and studied art at Central School of Art and Design, with a focus on lithography. In this time Binder drew scenes from everyday life in London that she made into lithographs. She published a series that illustrated "The Real East End" by Thomas Burke, a popular writer who ran a pub in Poplar at the time. Binder's illustrations are an intimate, first-hand portrayal of grimy London life in that era. In 1933 Binder was one of the founders of the left-wing Artists' International Association.

In 1937, Binder was involved in the earliest days of television broadcasting for children. That year, she co-presented Clothes-Line with the fashion historian James Laver. This live six-part series was the first television programme on the history of fashion. As she did not give birth to her daughter Josephine until 6 January 1938 – less than a month after the last episode transmitted – Binder could well have been the first heavily pregnant woman to appear on television.

In the course of her life, Binder travelled extensively in Russia and China, designed a musical, designed costumes for a theatre company, wrote stories for children, designed a Pearly mug and plate for Wedgwood, and instigated and executed a series of armorial windows at the House of Lords.

== Personal life ==
In 1937, she married Elwyn Jones. They had three children: fashion historian Professor Lou Taylor, artist and activist Dan Jones, and the children's author Josephine Gladstone, whose books she illustrated. After her death, her son-in-law, Joe Taylor recalled, "She was a woman who had great concern for others, especially women – she was a very keen supporter of women's rights", always keeping the name Pearl Binder next to her husband's name on the plaque outside their flat.

== Death ==
Binder died in Brighton on 25 January 1990 aged 86, seven weeks after the death of her husband.

== Publications ==
=== As illustrator ===
- Hobson, Coralie (1926). Bed and Breakfast. London: Bodley Head.
- Sieveking, L. de Giberne (1927). All children must be paid for. London: The Bodley Head.
- Austen, Jane (1929) [First published 1817]. Persuasion. New York: Walter McKee - The Bath Edition.
- Skelton, John (1928) [First published 1550]. The Tunning of Elynour Rumming. London: Fanfrolico Press. OCLC 650452028.
- Driberg, J. H. (1930). People of the Small Arrow. London: Routledge.
- de Nerval, Gérard (1932) [First published 1855]. Aurélia. Translated by Aldington, Richard. London: Chatto and Windus. OCLC 2329231.
- Burke, Thomas (1932). The Real East End. London: Constable.
- Radclyffe, E. J. D. (1932). Magic and Mind. London: A & C Clack.
- Godfrey, Philip (1933). Back-Stage, A Survey of the Contemporary English Theatre from Behind the Scenes. London: George Harrup. OCLC 488314978.
- Coppard, A. E. (1934). These Hopes of Heaven. London: Blue Moon Press.
- Lindsay, Jack (1935). The Romans. London: A & C Black. OCLC 6888705.
- Malnick, Bertha (1938). Everyday Life in Russia. London: George Harrup. OCLC 681481050.
- Glanville, Stephen (1953). The Egyptians. London: A & C Black. OCLC 869405326.
- Marquand, Josephine (1964). Chi Ming and the Tiger Kitten. New York: Franklyn Watts.
- Ordish, George (1967). Pigeons and people. London: Dennis Dobson. OCLC 561856801.
- Marquand, Josephine (1969). Chi Ming and the Lion Dance. London: Dobson. ISBN 9780234779927.
- Marquand, Josephine (1970). Chi Ming and the Writing Lesson. New York: Franklin Watts. OCLC 69143.
- Gladstone, Josephine (1974). Chi Ming and the Jade Ear-ring. London: Dobson. ISBN 978-0234774908.

=== As author and illustrator ===
- Binder, Pearl (1935). Odd Jobs. London: G. G. Harrup. OCLC 558092306.
- — (1936). Misha and Masha. London: Gollancz.
- — (1942). Russian Families. London: A & C Black. OCLC 181846291.
- — (1942). Misha learns English. Harmondsworth: Penguin Books (PP25). OCLC 1238560327.
- — (1953). Muffs and Morals. London: George Harrap. OCLC 1450338.
- — (1958). The Peacock's Tail. London: George Harrup. OCLC 558092313.
- — (1959). Look at Clothes. London: Hamish Hamilton.
- — (1961). The English inside out; an up to date report on morals and manners in England. London: Weidenfeld and Nicolson. OCLC 1347857.
- — (1972). Magic symbols of the world. London and New York: Hamish Hamilton. ISBN 9780600025450.
- —; Ordish, George (1972). Ladies Only. Dobson. ISBN 978-0234776971.
- — (1974). Treacle Terrace. London: Dennis Dobson. ISBN 978-0234775141.
- — (1975). The Pearlies : a social record. London: Jupiter Books. ISBN 9780904041187.
- — (1977). Treasure islands : the trials of the Ocean Islanders. Blond and Briggs. ISBN 9780856340710.
- — (1986). Dressing up, dressing down. London: Allen & Unwin. ISBN 9780043910122.
  - — (1988). Doresuappu doresudaun. Translated by Suginome, Yasuko. Tokyo: Iwanami Shoten. ISBN 978-4000014960. – Japanese translation of Dressing up, dressing down
- — (1986). The Truth About Cora Pearl. London: Weidenfeld and Nicolson. ISBN 9780297785903.
