= 2011 Man Booker Prize =

Literary award

The 2011 Booker Prize for Fiction was awarded at a ceremony on 18 October 2011. The longlist of 13 books was announced on 26 July, and was narrowed down to a shortlist of six on 6 September 2011. The Man Booker Prize was awarded to Julian Barnes for The Sense of an Ending.

== Judging panel ==
- Dame Stella Rimington (chair)
- Matthew d’Ancona
- Susan Hill
- Chris Mullin
- Gaby Wood

== Nominees (shortlist) ==
Author	Title	Genre(s)	Country	Publisher
Julian Barnes	The Sense of an Ending	Novel	UK	Jonathan Cape, Random House
Carol Birch	Jamrach's Menagerie	Novel	UK	Canongate Books
Patrick deWitt	The Sisters Brothers	Novel	Canada	Granta
Esi Edugyan	Half Blood Blues	Novel	Canada	Serpent's Tail
Stephen Kelman	Pigeon English	Novel	UK	Bloomsbury
Andrew Miller	Snowdrops	Novel	UK	Atlantic Books

== Nominees (longlist) ==
Author	Title	Genre(s)	Country	Publisher
Julian Barnes	The Sense of an Ending	Novel	UK	Jonathan Cape, Random House
Sebastian Barry	On Canaan's Side	Novel	Ireland	Faber and Faber
Carol Birch	Jamrach's Menagerie	Novel	UK	Canongate Books
Patrick deWitt	The Sisters Brothers	Novel	Canada	Granta
Esi Edugyan	Half Blood Blues	Novel	Canada	Serpent's Tail
Yvvette Edwards	A Cupboard Full of Coats	Novel	UK	Oneworld
Stephen Kelman	Pigeon English	Novel	UK	Bloomsbury
Patrick McGuinness	The Last Hundred Days	Novel	UK	Seren
Alan Hollinghurst	The Stranger's Child	Novel	UK	Picador
Andrew Miller	Snowdrops	Novel	UK	Atlantic Books
Alison Pick	Far to Go	Novel	Canada	Tinder Press
Jane Rogers	The Testament of Jessie Lamb	Novel	UK	Canongate Books
D. J. Taylor	Derby Day	Novel		Chatto & Windus
