= Cycleway 3 =

Long cycle path in London, England

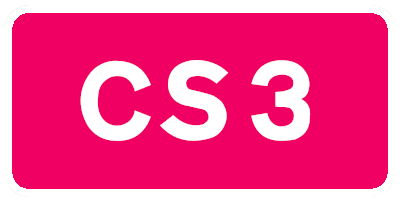
Cycleway 3

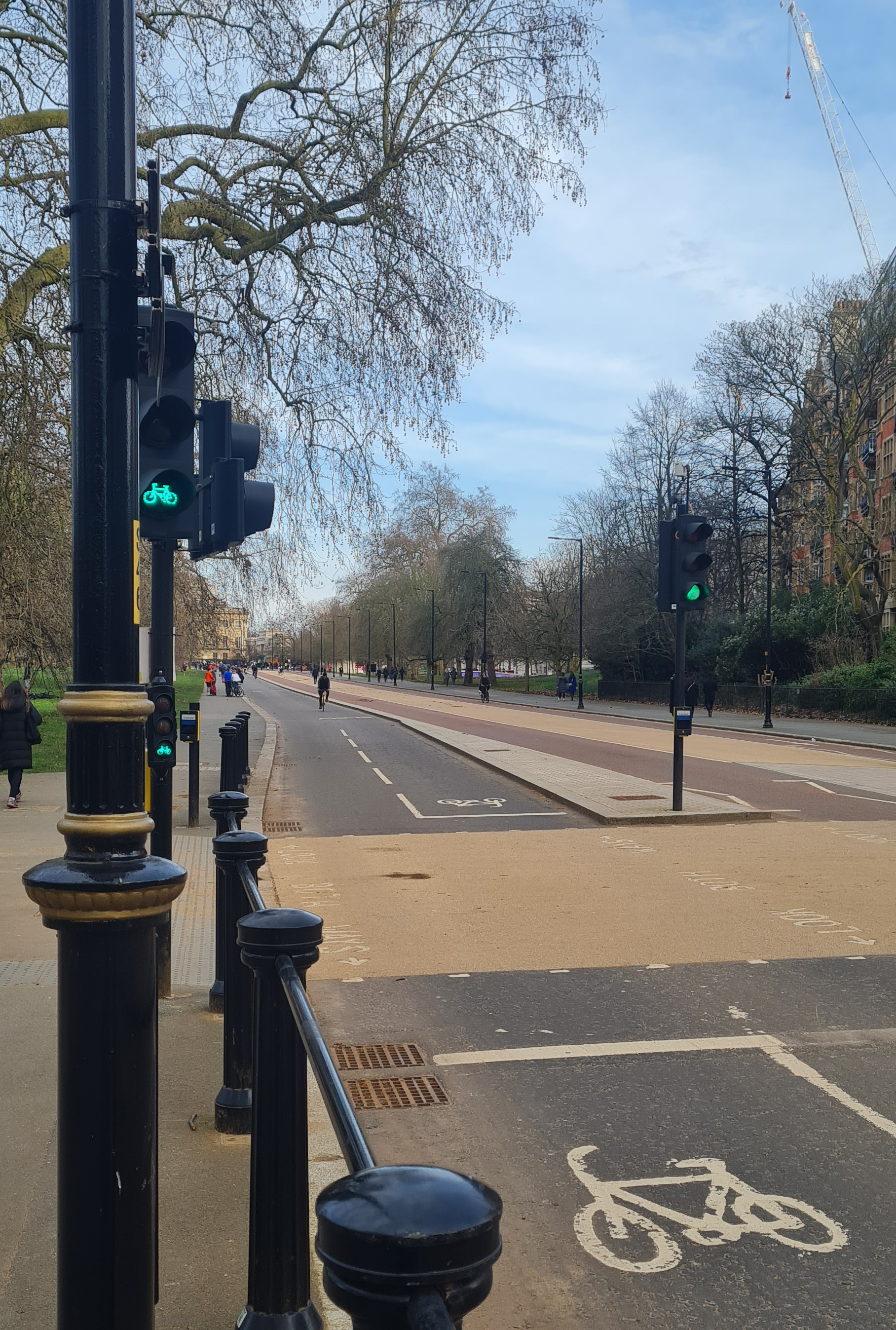
- Cycleway 3 at Hyde Park Corner

Route information
- Network: Cycleways
- Length: 14.9 miles (24 km)
- Direction: East–West
- Opened: July 2010
- Managed by: Transport for London
- Area served: City of Westminster; City of London; Tower Hamlets; Newham; Barking and Dagenham

Technical
- Segregation: Fully segregated
- Track type: Long distance cycle route

Cycleway 3 (C3) is a cycle route in London, England. It is part of the Cycleway network coordinated by TfL. It runs from Barking in the east to Lancaster Gate in central London. It is a popular route with both commuter and leisure cyclists, passing a number of major destinations in London along its route. For almost the entire route, cyclists are separated from other traffic in segregated cycle lanes, and cycling infrastructure has been provided at major interchanges. The cycleway, originally called Cycle Superhighway 3, was renamed to Cycleway 3 in January 2023.

== Route ==
C3 begins in Barking and ends at Lancaster Gate in the City of Westminster.

=== Barking to Leamouth ===
C3 begins to the south of Greatfields Park in Barking, at the intersection between River Road and the A13 (Alfred's Way). The beginning of the Superhighway can be found at the southern side of the junction as a narrow, two-way cycle track signed "Cycle Superhighway (C3)" towards Canning Town (25 mins), Canary Wharf (35 mins) and Tower Gateway (55 mins). The journey times are signposted and calculated by TfL. The cycle track is coloured blue.

Heading westbound, the blue cycle track is intermittent, sharing its space with the pedestrian footpath. This continues for around 500 metres before the blue, two-way track returns as a constant feature running in parallel with the A13, separated from the main carriageway by a kerb.

C3 and the A13 cross the Barking Creek alongside one another, at the same time crossing from Barking and Dagenham into Newham. After crossing Barking Creek, C3 branches southwards so as to avoid clashing with traffic at the busy junction between the A13, the A406/North Circular and A1020.

Having passed beneath the A1020/Royal Docks Road, C3 continues to run parallel to the A13 (Newham Way), segregated from traffic on the main carriageway. On this section, the Superhighway passes through Beckton, where there is a short cycle link southwards towards Beckton DLR station, and then to the east of Canning Town station, before running in parallel to the A13 once more to cross Bow Creek. The entirety of this section through Newham is shared with route 13 of the 1980s-era London Cycle Network.

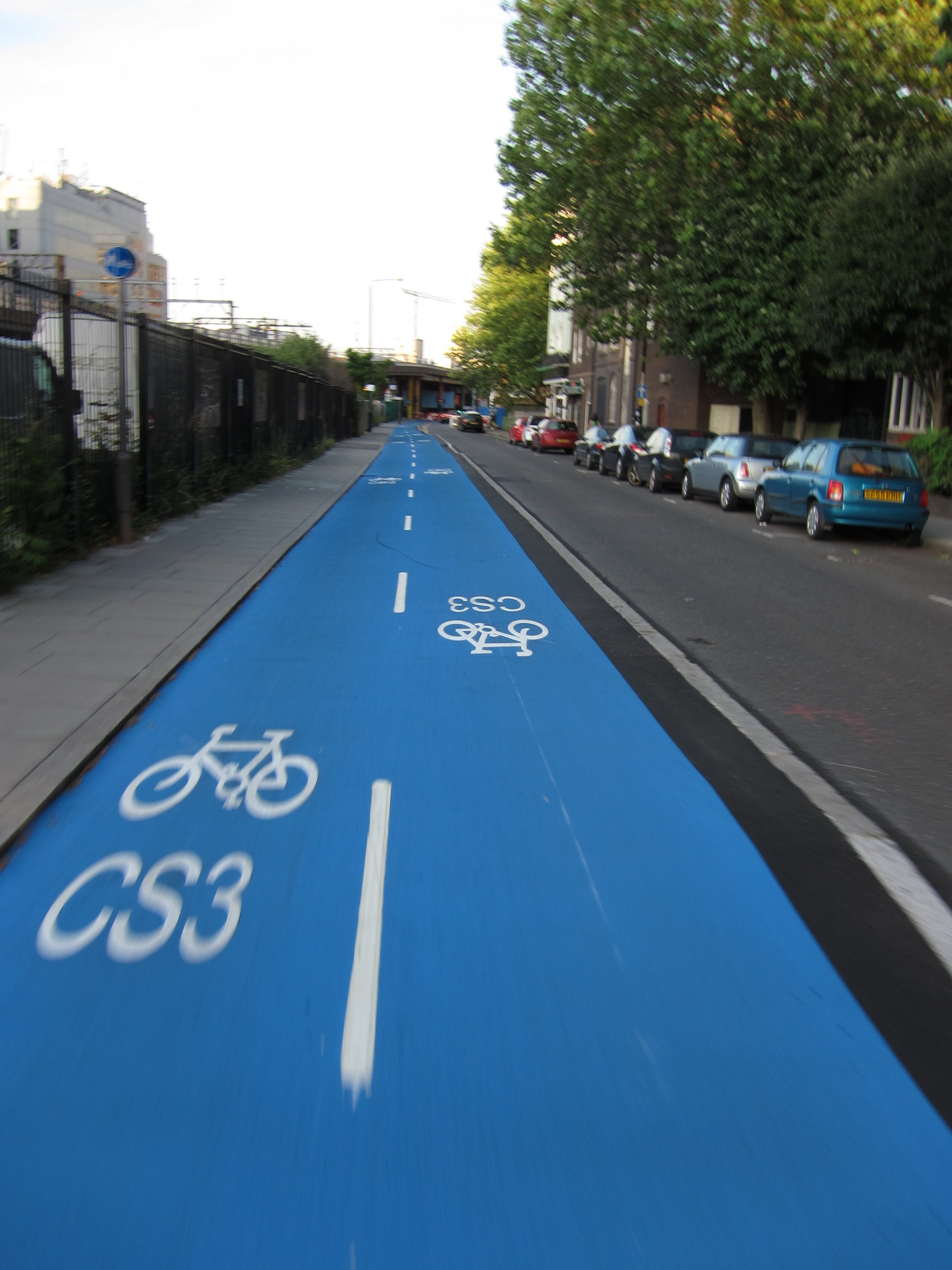
Cycle Superhighway 3 at Cable Street

=== Leamouth to Tower Gateway ===
To the west of Bow Creek, C3 enters Tower Hamlets and heads south of East India Dock Road (A13) into Leamouth on the western pavement of Leamouth Road. Still signposted but no longer a blue cycle track, C3 then heads westbound on Sorrel Lane, southbound on Oregano Drive, then westbound on Saffron Avenue. Cyclists share road space with other traffic in this more residential area.

C3 passes through Poplar, just north of Canary Wharf, sharing Poplar High Street with other road traffic. At the western end of Poplar High Street, the Superhighway continues along Ming Street and Premiere Place, passing Westferry DLR station to the north. Continuing westbound, C3 follows Limehouse Causeway and Narrow Street, briefly running parallel to the River Thames.

Still signposted, C3 then heads roughly north, joining Cable Street at its eastern terminus.

On Cable Street, the Cycleway is segregated from other road traffic on a narrow, two-way cycle track. The track itself pre-dates the Cycle Superhighway, constructed as part of the London Cycle Network, but C3 introduced wayfinding and blue surfacing to aid route-finding. The Superhighway runs the entire length of Cable Street, passing both the Cable Street Mural and Shadwell DLR and London Overground stations.

C3 leaves Tower Hamlets on Royal Mint Street, entering the City of London.

=== Tower Gateway to Lancaster Gate ===
The Superhighway crosses London's Inner Ring Road near Tower Gateway station. Tower Bridge and the Tower of London are visible to the south of C3. Entering the City of London, C3 is a wide cycle track segregated from other road traffic. This remains the case until C3 reaches the Palace of Westminster.

In the City, the Superhighway avoids the busy centre, instead running in parallel to the Thames. Remaining segregated from other traffic, C3 meets C6 in a grade-separated junction at Blackfriars. At this point, the Superhighway crosses Victoria Embankment, following the Embankment until it reaches its southern terminus at the Palace of Westminster and Westminster Bridge. C3 crosses the boundary between the City of London and the City of Westminster.

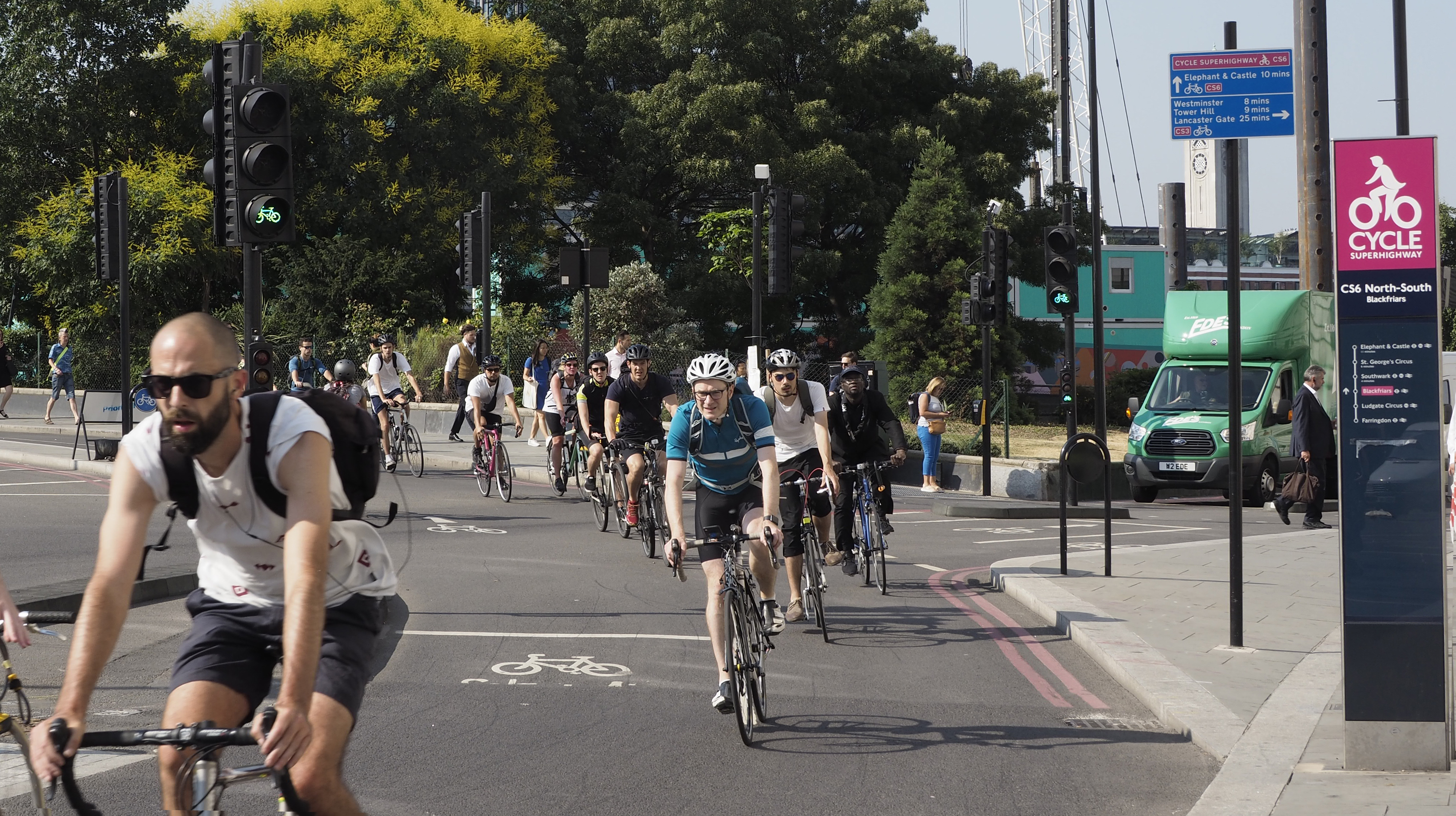
C3 passes under C6 at Blackfriars.

At the end of Victoria Embankment, C3 heads westbound on Bridge Street, again as a wide, segregated cycle track, passing Parliament Square on its northernmost edge. C3 then passes several government offices as it continues westbound, running along the entire length of Birdcage Walk (the southern boundary of St. James's Park).

C3 then heads briefly north, passing Buckingham Palace, before continuing westbound again on Constitution Hill as a segregated bike freeway. The Superhighway then passes through the middle of Hyde Park Corner, sharing space with pedestrians.

Leaving Hyde Park Corner to the north, C3 heads sharply westbound along a wide bike freeway which runs along the southern edge of Hyde Park (South Carriage Drive). At the end of the Drive, C3 heads sharply northbound, following West Carriage Drive to its terminus at Lancaster Gate.

The beginning of C3 at Lancaster Gate is signposted towards Hyde Park Corner (11 mins), Westminster (20 mins) and Kensington.

== Destinations ==
=== Barking and Dagenham ===
- Greatfields Park

=== Newham ===
- Beckton DLR station
- Newham University Hospital
- Canning Town station
- Bow Creek Ecology Park

=== Tower Hamlets ===
- East India DLR station
- Blackwall DLR station
- Westferry DLR station
- Shadwell DLR station
- Shadwell Railway station
- Cable Street Mural

=== City of London ===
- Tower Bridge
- Tower of London
- Tower Gateway station
- Tower Hill station
- Cannon Street station
- Blackfriars station

=== City of Westminster ===
- Temple station
- Embankment station
- Palace of Westminster and Big Ben
- Westminster station
- Parliament Square
- Churchill War Rooms
- HM Treasury
- St. James's Park
- Buckingham Palace
- Green Park
- Wellington Arch
- Hyde Park Corner
- Hyde Park Corner station
- Hyde Park
- Exhibition Road
- Serpentine Gallery
- Lancaster Gate
- Lancaster Gate station

== History ==
C3 was constructed in 3 sections:

1. Barking to Tower Gateway in the east, opened July 2010
2. Tower Gateway to Parliament Square, opened April 2016
3. Parliament Square to Lancaster Gate in the west, opened September 2018

The route which became known as C3 was originally proposed by the former Mayor of London Ken Livingstone. In 2008, Livingstone proposed a "cycling transformation in London," at the same time announcing the "biggest investment in cycling in London's history." CS3 was one of the original twelve "motorways of cycling," and was designed to take cyclists along the route it currently occupies from Barking to Lancaster Gate. It was proposed that CS3 would then join up with two further superhighways - CS9 and CS10 - to extend the network in to West London.

When Boris Johnson became mayor in 2008, he proceeded with a modified Cycle Superhighways plan, which retained some of these radial routes, including the Barking to Tower Gateway CS3 as one of the first 2 routes to be delivered. But Johnson's plan initially excluded any major routes through the very centre of London. This decision to drop the central London routes was reversed 4 years later with a manifesto commitment made by Johnson in the 2012 London elections, which followed criticism of the design quality of the first Cycle Superhighways to be delivered, and a high profile campaign by London Cycling Campaign calling for upgrades and for the missing links across central London. Johnson dubbed this central section of the route a "Crossrail for cyclists," hoping to create a "cleaner, safer, greener city."
