= The Highway, London =

Road in the East End of London, England

Coordinates: 51.5097°N 0.0579°W

The Highway
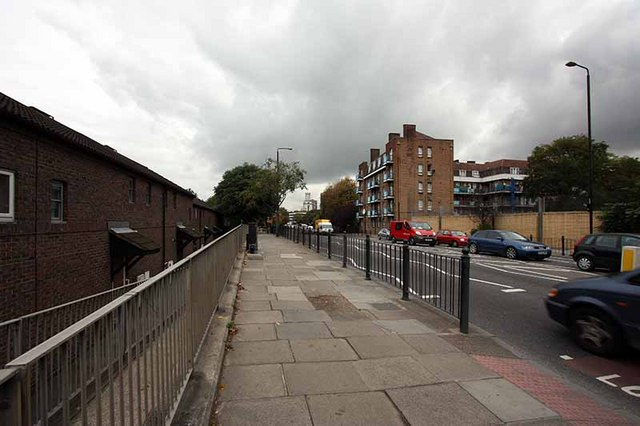
- The Highway near the junction of Garnet Street
- Interactive map of The Highway
- Former name: Ratcliffe Highway
- Length: 1.4 mi (2.3 km)
- Location: London Borough of Tower Hamlets, United Kingdom
- Postal code: E1, E1W
- West end: East Smithfield
- East end: Limehouse Link Tunnel

Other
- Known for: Ratcliff Highway murders

The Highway, formerly known as the Ratcliffe Highway, is a road in the London Borough of Tower Hamlets, in the East End of London. The route dates back to Roman times. In the 19th century it had a reputation for vice and crime and was the location of the Ratcliff Highway murders. Prior to a renaming programme of 1937, different parts of the route had different names depending on what district they were in.

== Location ==
The Highway runs west–east from the eastern edge of London's financial district, the City of London, to Limehouse. It runs parallel to and south of Commercial Road, the Docklands Light Railway and Cable Street, and connects East Smithfield (the street) and the Limehouse Link tunnel.

Prior to the London County Council renaming programme of 1937, different parts of the route had different names depending on what district they were in. From west to east these ran: St. George's Street East, High Street (Shadwell), Cock Hill, and Broad Street. The whole of the central area of The Highway was named after St. George in the East church and the parish of St. George in the East.

== History ==
The Ratcliffe (sometimes Ratcliff) Highway dates from at least Saxon Britain, running east from the City of London, London's historic core, along the top of a plateau above low-lying tidal marshes of Wapping and Shadwell to the south. The road takes its name from its destination, the settlement of Ratcliff.

The road was recorded as The highway at Ratclyf in 1561, and Ratcliffe high way in 1641.,

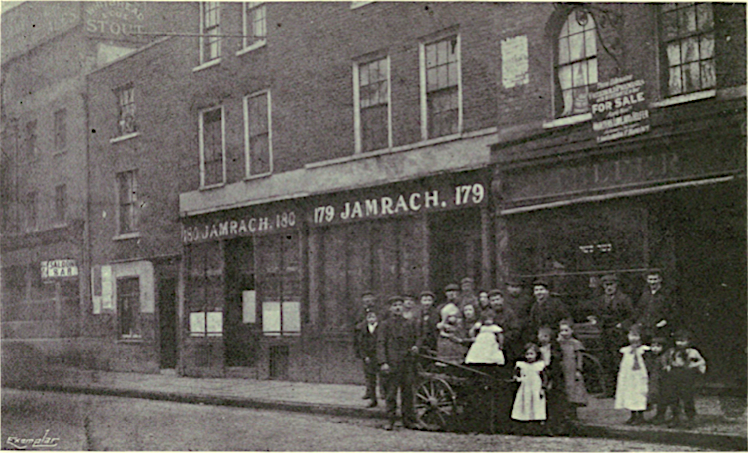
Jamrach, the famous dealer in wild animals. According to one source the animals (including lions) were kept in cages in the basement.

In the late 19th century Charles Jamrach, a dealer in wild animals, opened Jamrach's Animal Emporium on The Highway. The store became the largest pet store in the world as seafarers moored at the Port of London sold any exotic animals they had brought with them to Jamrach, who in turn supplied zoos, menageries and private collectors. At the north entrance to the nearby Tobacco Dock stands a bronze sculpture of a boy standing in front of a tiger, commemorating an incident where a fully-grown Bengal tiger escaped from Jamrach's shop into the street and picked up and carried off a small boy, who had approached and tried to pet the animal having never seen such a big cat before. The boy escaped unhurt after Jamrach gave chase and prised open the animal's jaw with his bare hands. The tale was the inspiration for the 2011 novel Jamrach's Menagerie by British author Carol Birch.

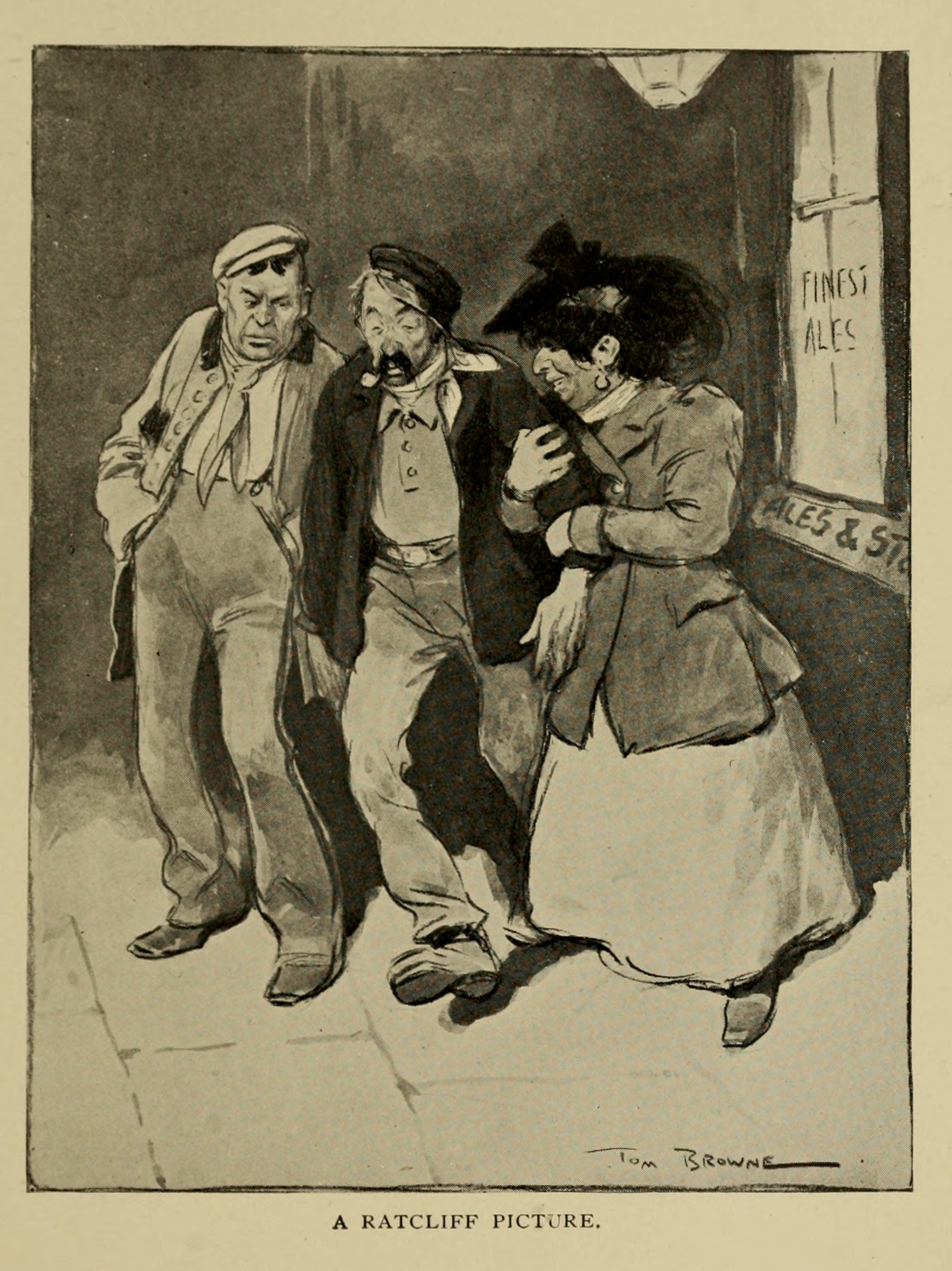
A Ratcliff Picture (1902). A low prostitute and her bully about to mug a sailor on a drunken spree (centre).

A Roman bath house was excavated in 2004 by the junction of The Highway and Wapping Lane. The discovery of women's jewellery along with soldiers' possessions suggested that this location outside of the Roman walls allowed less restricted use of the baths than those in the City itself. The remains of the baths and under-floor heating system were re-buried under the car-park of a development of new apartments.

== Song ==
There are two notable folk songs called Ratcliffe Highway; one is a traditional folk song (Roud 598; Ballad Index Doe114; Wiltshire 785]. The other, Roud 493, also called The Deserter and famously recorded by Sandy Denny and Fairport Convention, concerns a young man who is pressed-ganged into the navy on the Highway.

== Landmarks ==
Listed from west to east:

- St Katharine Docks
- Wellclose Square
- St. Paul's primary school
- Ensign Club – a local youth club
- Telford's Yard – a converted Victorian wool warehouse
- The Caxton pub – displays newspaper history on the walls
- Location of the Ratcliff Highway murders
- Mary Sambrook school
- The Travellers Rest – evangelical church
- The Old Rose pub
- Tobacco Dock – former warehouses for imported tobacco, converted to retail outlets
- St George in the East – a white stone church that has dominated the area since 1729
- St. George's recreation ground
- St. George's swimming pool
- Green Gables Montessori school
- St. Paul's Church, Shadwell – the church of sea captains
- Shadwell Basin – old dock now used for watersports and fishing.
- Glamis Adventure Playground – an example of the London style of adventure playgrounds created in the early 1970s
- King Edward Memorial Park
- Limehouse Link tunnel

== Transport ==
=== Road ===
The Highway is a major arterial route into and out of the City of London and can become heavily congested during rush hour. There are two lanes in each direction throughout its length. It lies outside of the London congestion charge zone (CCZ).

=== Bus ===
There are few bus stops on The Highway, but London Buses routes 100 and D3 pass along short lengths of it. Route 100 connects to Shadwell, Liverpool Street, St. Paul's and Elephant and Castle, while D3 connects to the Isle of Dogs, Limehouse, Shadwell and Bethnal Green.

=== Rail ===
The following stations are located on or near The Highway, all in Transport for London's fare zone 2:

- Wapping (East London Line, now part of London Overground)
- Tower Hill (Circle and District lines)
- Shadwell DLR (also a London Overground Station)
- Limehouse DLR (also a National Rail station)

== People ==
Some names associated with the area include:

- Arthur Morrison (1863–1945), author, wrote about Ratcliff Highway in his novel The Hole in the Wall (1902)
- Sir William Henry Perkin (1838–1907), chemist who discovered mauveine, who was baptised at St. Paul's Church, Shadwell
- Oscar Wilde (1854–1900), visited the opium dens near Dellow Street
- Sir Arthur Conan Doyle (1859–1930), visited the opium dens as research for his detective character Sherlock Holmes
- Charles Jamrach (1815–1891), importer and dealer of wild and exotic animals who owned a shop on the street

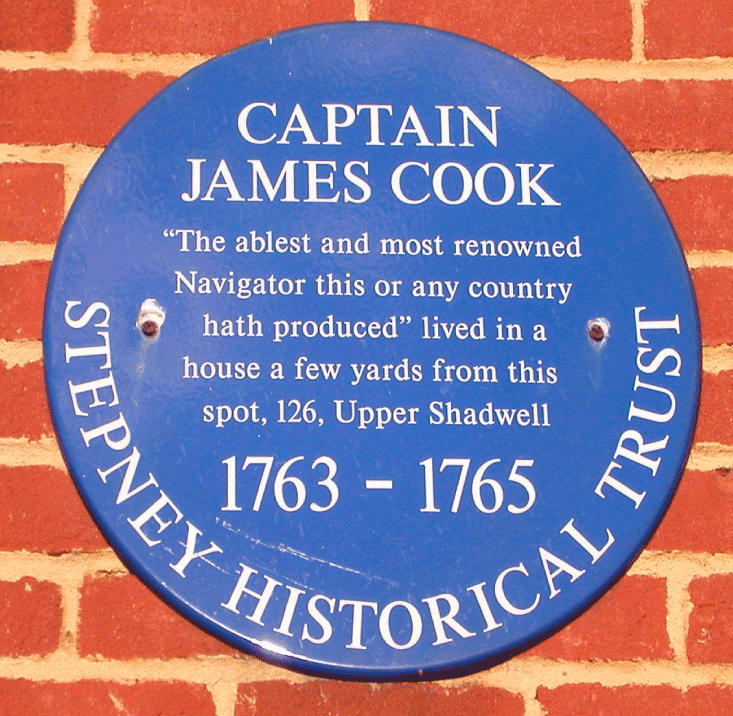
Blue plaque for Captain James Cook, who lived in the area.

- Captain James Cook (1728–1779), explorer and cartographer, who lived in the area from 1763 to 1765 and baptised some of his children at St. Paul's Church, Shadwell. A blue plaque commemorates him at No. 326, The Highway. (A slate plaque also marks another of his homes at No. 88, Mile End Road.)
- Jane Randolph (1720–1776), mother of Thomas Jefferson, was baptised at St. Paul's Church, Shadwell
- John Wesley (1703–1791), the famous cleric, who preached at St. Paul's Church, Shadwell
- Nicholas Hawksmoor (1661–1736), the architect who designed the church of St. George in the East

The following people inspired some local street names:

- Nathaniel Heckford and Sarah Maud Heckford – a young doctor and his wife who founded the first children's hospital in East London
- Daniel Solander – a Swedish botanist who travelled with James Cook exploring the Pacific islands
- Emanuel Swedenborg – a Swedish scientist, philosopher and mystic in the Georgian era

== Neighbouring streets ==
West of The Highway:

- East Smithfield

North of The Highway, from west to east:

- Cable Street – runs parallel to The Highway
- Dock Street
- Ensign Street – formerly Wells Street (1862)
- Hard's Place – a path between Wellclose Square and the south end of Ensign Street
- Grace's Alley – formerly Gracie's Alley, a path between Wellclose Square and the north end of Ensign Street, and home to Wilton's Music Hall
- Wellclose Square
- Swedenborg Gardens
- Betts Street – formerly connected Cable Street to The Highway
- Crowder Street – formerly Denmark Street
- Cannon Street Road
- Dellow Street
- Solander Gardens
- King David Lane
- Juniper Street – formerly Juniper Row
- Tarbert Walk
- Redcastle Close – formerly Carriage Way
- Glamis Road
- Glamis Place
- Brodlove Lane – formerly Love Lane
- Elf Row – formerly Elm Row
- Glasshouse Fields – formerly Glasshouse Street
- Schoolhouse Lane
- Heckford Street – formerly Burlington Place, a trades wholesaler park
- Ratcliffe Orchard – formerly The Orchard

East of The Highway:

- Butcher Row – formerly White Horse Street
- Narrow Street
- Limehouse Link tunnel

South of The Highway, from west to east:

- Vaughan Way
- Telford's Yard
- Artichoke Hill – the escape route for the Ratcliff Highway murderers
- Chigwell Hill
- Pennington Street
- Wapping Lane – formerly Old Gravel Lane
- Sovereign Close
- Princes Court
- West Gardens
- Rum Close
- Garnet Street – formerly New Gravel Lane
- Newlands Quay – formerly Elbow Lane
- Maynards Quay
- Glamis Road
- Pear Tree Lane – formerly Fox's Lane, now named after The Pear Tree, the inn where the second Ratcliff Highway murders took place
- Shadwell Basin
- Jardine Road
- Rialto Avenue
