= Charles Jamrach =

British dealer in wildlife (1815–1891)

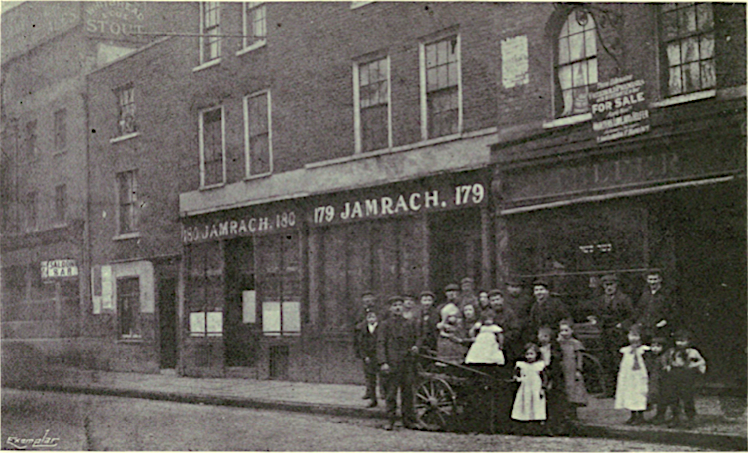
Jamrach's premises at 179 St George Street (Ratcliff Highway)

Charles Jamrach (born Johann Christian Carl Jamrach; March 1815 – 6 September 1891) was a leading dealer in wildlife, birds and shells in 19th-century London. He owned an exotic pet store on the Ratcliffe Highway in east London – at the time the largest such shop in the world. Jamrach's nearest rival was Edward Cross, who ran a menagerie at Exeter Exchange on the Strand.

Jamrach was born in Germany (either in Hamburg or Memel). His father, Johann Gottlieb Jamrach, was chief of the Hamburg river police (the Wasserschutzpolizei), whose contacts with sailors enabled him to build up a trade as a dealer in birds and wild animals, establishing branches in Antwerp and London.

Charles Jamrach moved to London and took over that branch of the business after his father's death in circa 1840. He became a leading importer, breeder, and exporter of animals, selling to noblemen, zoos, menageries and circus owners, and buying from ships docking in London and nearby ports, with agents in other major British ports, including Liverpool, Southampton and Plymouth, and also in continental Europe. His business included a shop and a museum – named Jamrach's Animal Emporium – on the Ratcliffe Highway and a menagerie in Betts Street, both in the East End, and a warehouse in Old Gravel Lane, Southwark.

According to a contemporary author Jamrach had an exotic stock:

the elephant, rhinoceros, lion, tiger, puma, yak, bear, ibex, lemur, and baboon are represented, and sometimes by several specimens of each. But the most valuable beast, outside elephants, are the African goat, exhibited in 1875 at the Crystal Palace, and the Tasmanian-devil, of which one is usually in stock.

After a Bengal tiger escaped from its box at the Emporium in 1857, and picked up and carried off a passing eight- or nine-year-old boy, Jamrach "came running up and, thrusting his bare hands into the tiger's throat, forced the beast to let his captive go". The boy, who had approached and tried to pet the animal having never seen such a big cat before, sued Jamrach and was awarded £300 in damages. The tiger was sold to George Wombwell and became a popular attraction at his menagerie. The tiger's escape, and subsequent rescue, are commemorated by a bronze statue near the entrance to Tobacco Dock, a short distance from the scene of the incident.

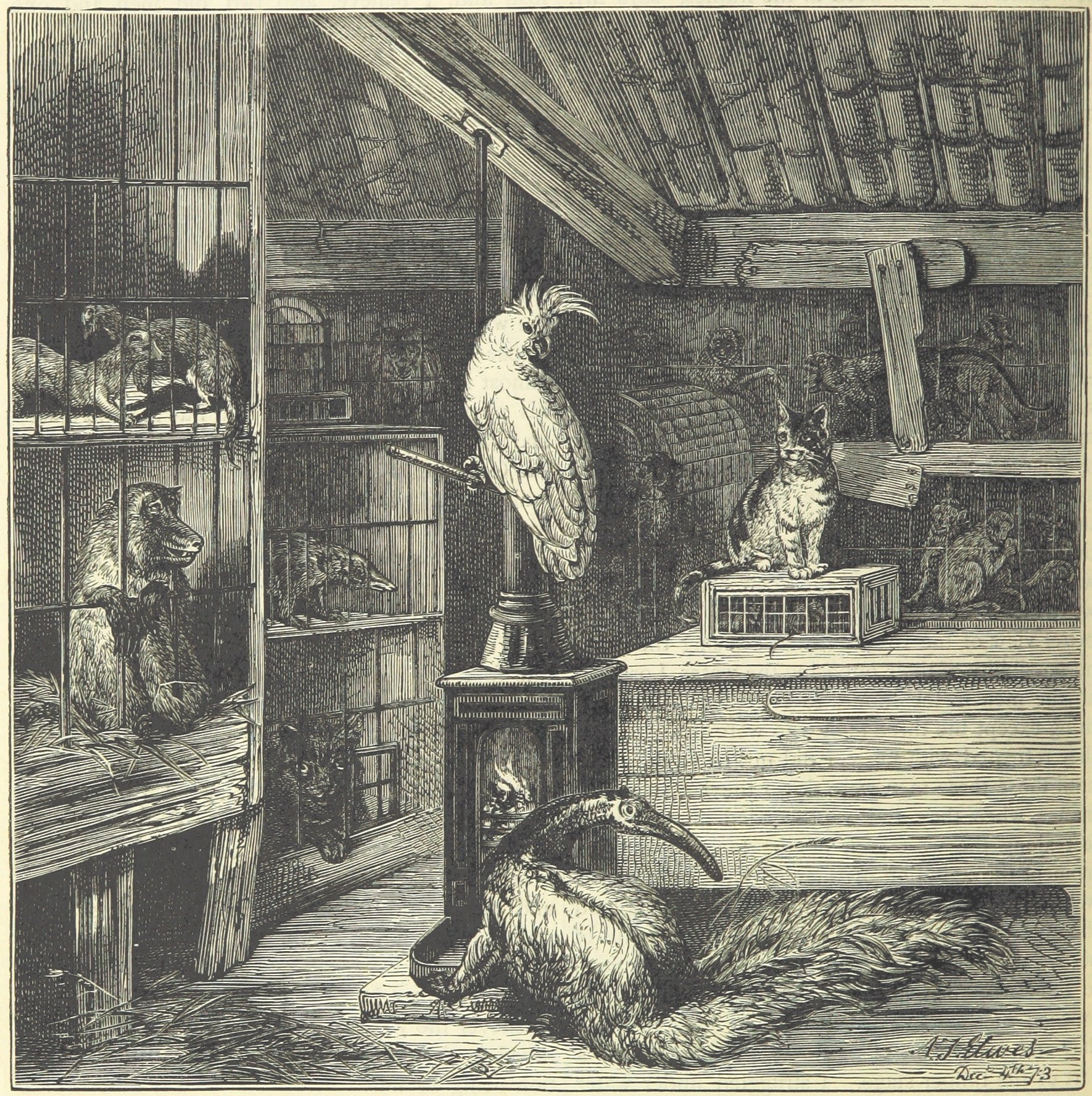
Ratcliffe Wild-beast Shop

Jamrach was also largely responsible for restocking P. T. Barnum's circus after a fire in 1864.

A sea snail, Amoria jamrachii, was named after Jamrach by John Edward Gray, keeper of zoology at the British Museum, to whom Jamrach had forwarded the shell after he obtained it.

Jamrach was married three times, first to Mary Athanasio; then to Ellen Downing; and finally to Clara Salter. Two of his sons, William and Albert, also became dealers in wildlife. Jamrach died in Bow on 6 September 1891. The business prospered for some time, but encountered difficulties during the First World War. After Albert died in 1917, the firm went out of business in 1919.

== In popular culture ==
Jamrach's Menagerie was well known in Victorian England, and is a frequent contemporary reference in Victorian popular literature. Jamrach is name-dropped in Bram Stoker's Dracula (1897); H. G. Wells' The First Men in the Moon (1901); Saki's short story "Reginald's Drama" (1903); and Stoker's The Lair of the White Worm (1911).

Carol Birch's novel Jamrach's Menagerie (2011), a work of historical fiction, was long-listed for the Orange Prize and short-listed for the Man Booker Prize.

Jamrach's Menagerie was featured in several episodes of the fifth season of the TV drama Ripper Street (2016).
