= Cable Street =

Street in the East End of London, England

Coordinates: 51.5112°N 0.056°W

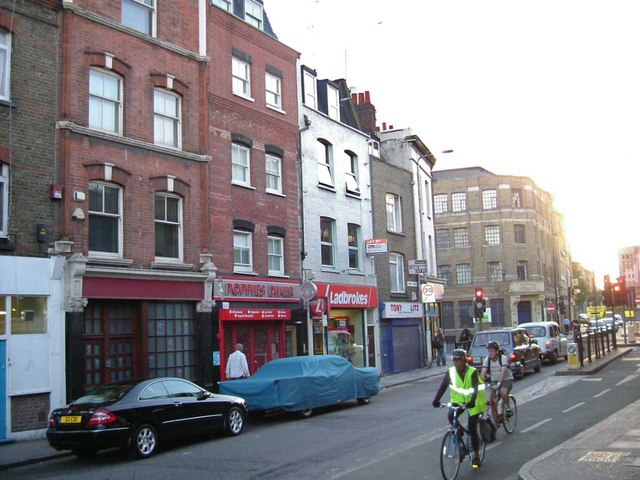
- Interactive map of Cable Street
- Length: 1.2 mi (1.9 km)
- Location: London Borough of Tower Hamlets, United Kingdom
- Postal code: E1, E1W
- Nearest train station: Shadwell; Shadwell
- West end: Tower Hill
- East end: Limehouse

Other
- Known for: Battle of Cable Street

Cable Street is a 1.15 mile-long road in the London Borough of Tower Hamlets, in the East End of London, England. It was made famous by the Battle of Cable Street in 1936.

== Location ==
Cable Street starts near the edge of London's financial district and ancient core, the City of London. It begins as an eastward extension of Royal Mint Street and passes through four historic parish districts. It begins with a short section in south-western Whitechapel, before passing into the St George in the East area of Wapping - for a stretch forming the boundary of St George in the East (north) and Shadwell (south). It continues east, terminating at the junction with Butcher Row in Ratcliff. The terminating junction is close to Limehouse railway station.

The street is parallel to, and south of, the Docklands Light Railway and Commercial Road, and north of The Highway.

The street lies within the parliamentary constituencies of Bethnal Green and Stepney, currently represented by Rushanara Ali of the Labour party.

== History ==
Cable Street started as a straight path along which hemp ropes were twisted into ships' cables (i.e. ropes). These supplied the many ships that would anchor in the nearby Pool of London, between London Bridge and Wapping and Rotherhithe. Many other ropewalks can be seen on later maps, showing how demand for ropes grew as shipping increased.

Until Victorian times, the current Cable Street had different names for each of its sections. From west to east these ran: Cable Street, Knock Fergus, New Road, Back Lane, Bluegate Street (recorded in 1692), Sun Tavern Fields, and Brook Street.

Knock Fergus (sometimes spelled Knock Vargis) may reflect the large numbers of Irish residents once present. It is an old name, with the earliest surviving record dating from 1597 and commonly recorded up to the end of the 17th century. Knock Fergus (the hillock of Fergus) is an old name for Carrickfergus in County Antrim.

The name Cable Street is first recorded on the 1703 Gascoyne map, with the eastern part marked as Swan Street, probably after a public house. It is possible that the name "Cable Street" may relate to Mary Cable, a person recorded as living in the district in 1629. Also, in the 19th century, the area at the western end of Cable Street was identified as "near Wellclose Square", as this was a well-known landmark, where nautical items were sold. From Victorian times through to the 1950s, Cable Street had a reputation for cheap lodgings, brothels, drinking inns and opium dens.

To the west the street takes the name "Royal Mint Street", which was recorded as Hoggesstreet in 1321, Hoglane in 1544 and known as Rosemary Lane by 1608. Rosemary Lane also had the byname Rag Fair due to the second hand clothes trade carried out there.

The last occasion in England when a stake was hammered through a sinner's heart at an official burial, took place at the junction of Cable Street and Cannon Street Road: John Williams was found hanged in his cell, after being arrested as a suspect in the Ratcliff Highway murders. Local people went along with the claim that he had committed suicide, from guilt of the crimes. At the time, 1812, suicide was considered to be sinful, and justified him being buried upside down with a stake through his heart. His skull was found when new gas mains were being laid in August 1886, and was on display for many years in The Crown and Dolphin pub opposite.

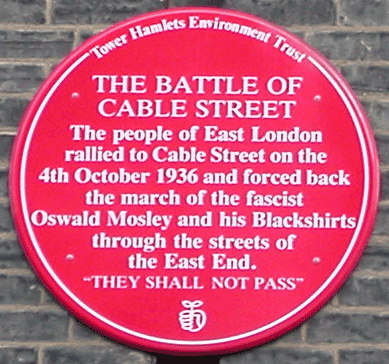
Red plaque in Dock Street commemorating the Battle of Cable Street.

On 4 October 1936 a violent confrontation between the Metropolitan Police and local communities on the street, at Tower Hill and around Aldgate became known as the "Battle of Cable Street". Local people, rallied by the Independent Labour Party, local elements of the Communist Party of Great Britain and the Jewish People's Council set out to obstruct a planned march through the East End by Oswald Mosley's British Union of Fascists.

The East End has traditionally been an area of London with a large Jewish population. This link was reinforced by the approximately 100,000 Jews from Eastern Europe that fled to the East End in the period 1881–1914. Mosley's movement was strongly antisemitic, so the march through the East End was regarded as deliberately provocative.

The BUF gathered at Tower Hill and the police tried to clear a route for them via Aldgate or Cable Street. After several hours of fighting, the police had failed to clear a path on either route and, to avoid further unrest, told Mosley he would have to march to the West End instead.

A large mural (created between 1979 and 1983) on St George's Town Hall, next to Library Place, depicts scenes from the day. A red plaque at Cable Street's junction with Dock Street commemorates the incident.

== Landmarks ==
Listed from west to east:

- Wilton's Music Hall – the world's oldest surviving grand music hall
- Wellclose Square
- St George in the East church
- St George's Recreation Ground
- Mural of the Battle of Cable Street
- St George's town hall
- St George's swimming pool
- Shadwell railway station
- Watney market
- Shadwell fire station
- Blue Gate Fields primary school
- St Mary's church
- Cable Street Studios

== Transport ==
=== Road ===
Vehicular traffic is restricted to travel one-way along the whole street, though the direction varies. It is mostly west-bound, but it is east-bound east of Brodlove Lane (itself one-way north-bound). It lies outside of the London congestion charge zone (CCZ).

=== Bicycle ===
London Cycle Superhighway 3 runs the length of Cable Street in the form of a two-way segregated cycle track, continuing west into Royal Mint Street (its western terminus). This is well used by cyclists, especially those commuting to the City and Docklands.

=== Bus ===
London Buses routes 100 and D3 both pass west-bound through the central part of Cable Street:

- Route 100 connects to Wapping, Liverpool Street, St Paul's Cathedral and Elephant and Castle.
- Route D3 connects to the Isle of Dogs, Limehouse, Wapping and Bethnal Green.
- Route 339 connects to Mile End, Bow and Old Ford from next to Shadwell DLR station.

=== Rail ===
The district falls within Transport for London's London fare zone 2. The nearest London Underground station is Tower Hill. Opened in 2010, the nearest London Overground stations are Shadwell and Wapping on the East London Line.

The nearest Docklands Light Railway stations are Shadwell and Limehouse (also a National Rail station).

== Musical ==
A musical based on the events in Cable Street in October 1936 ran at the Southwark Playhouse theatre in London from 16 February to 16 March 2024.

== People ==
People associated with the area:

=== Science and medicine ===
- Hannah Billig, MD, GM, MBE, (1901–1987) – a local doctor who became known as "The Angel of Cable Street". A blue plaque marks her home surgery at number 198, near Cannon Street Road.
- Sir William Henry Perkin, FRS, (1838–1907), chemist who discovered the aniline purple dye mauveine in a hut in the garden of his family's Cable Street home. A blue plaque marks the site, by the junction with King David Lane.

=== Sports ===
- Jack 'Kid' Berg (1909–1991) – lightweight champion boxer, known as the Whitechapel Windmill, born in Cable Street, by Noble Court. A blue plaque marks the site near where he lived.
- Norman Giller, prolific sportswriter, was born in Cable Street in 1940; his 100th book is an autobiography called The Kid from Cable Street
- Bombardier Billy Wells, British and Empire heavyweight boxing champion and Lonsdale Belt winner, and the Rank gongman, was born at 250 Cable Street.

=== Literary figures ===
- Sir Arthur Conan Doyle visited the opium dens as research for his detective character Sherlock Holmes.
- Isaac Rosenberg (1890–1918), poet and painter, lived at 47 Cable Street from 1897 to 1900, when he attended St Paul's School in Wellclose Square. A blue plaque located at 77 Whitechapel High Street commemorates this.
- Oscar Wilde visited the opium dens off Cable Street, near Dellow Street.

=== Artists ===
- Dan Jones – British artist, collector of children's playground songs and human rights campaigner
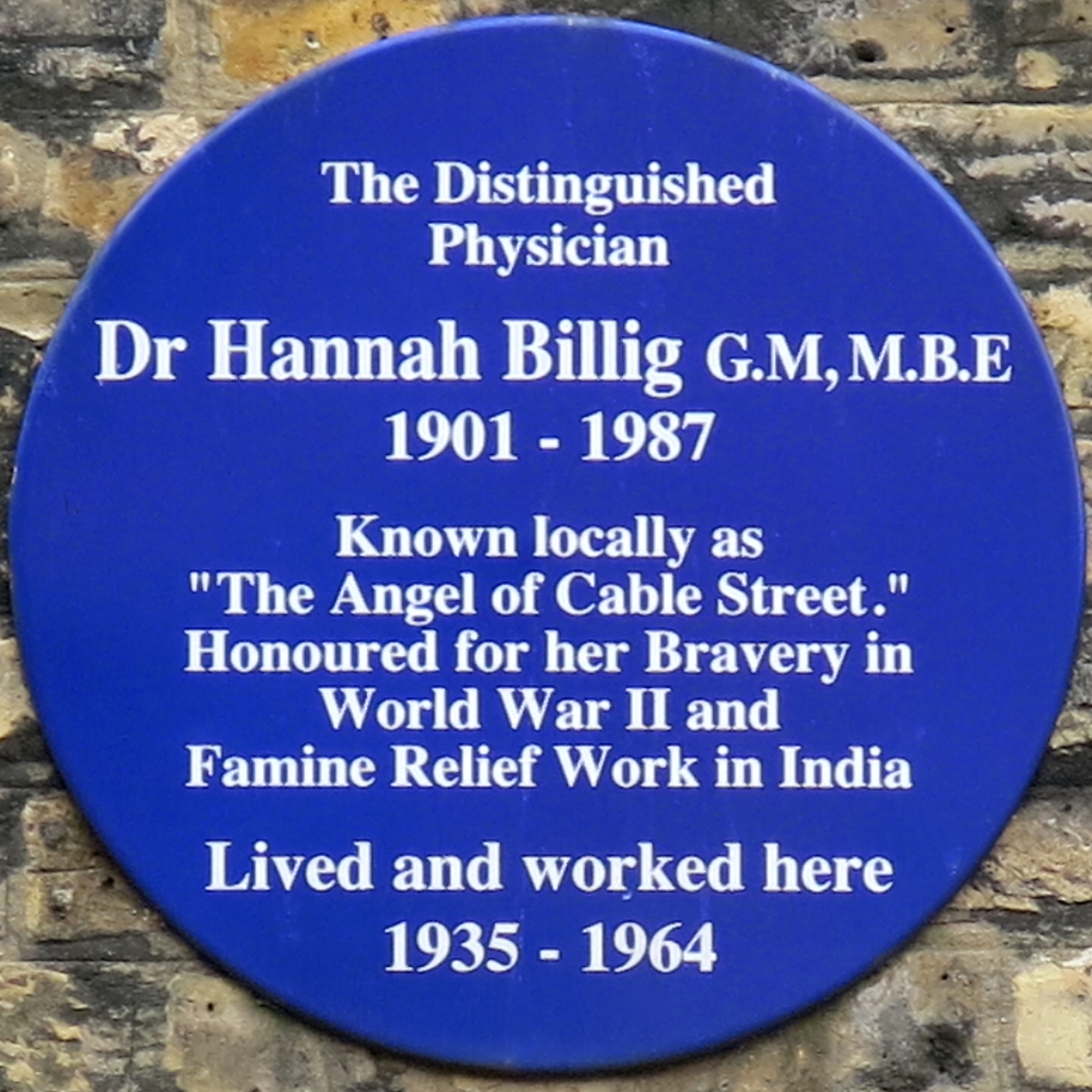
Hannah Billig

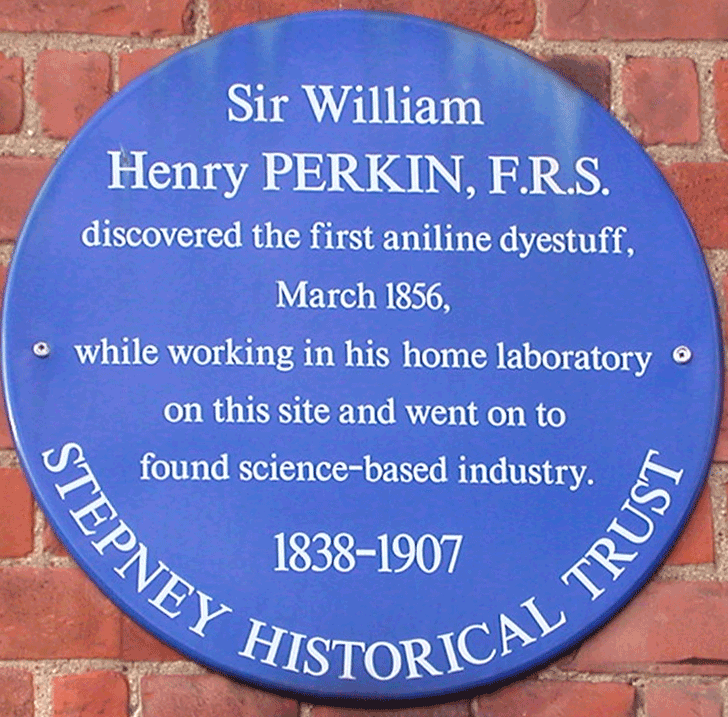
William Perkin

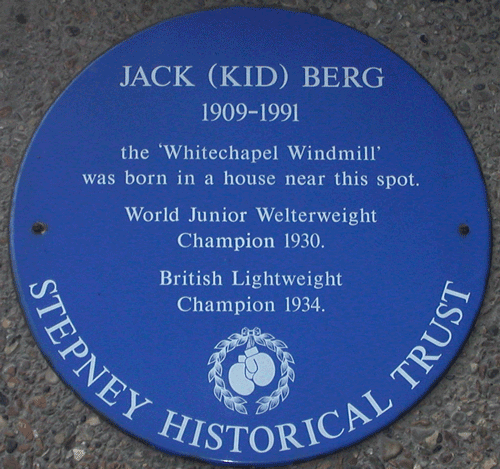
Jack 'Kid' Berg

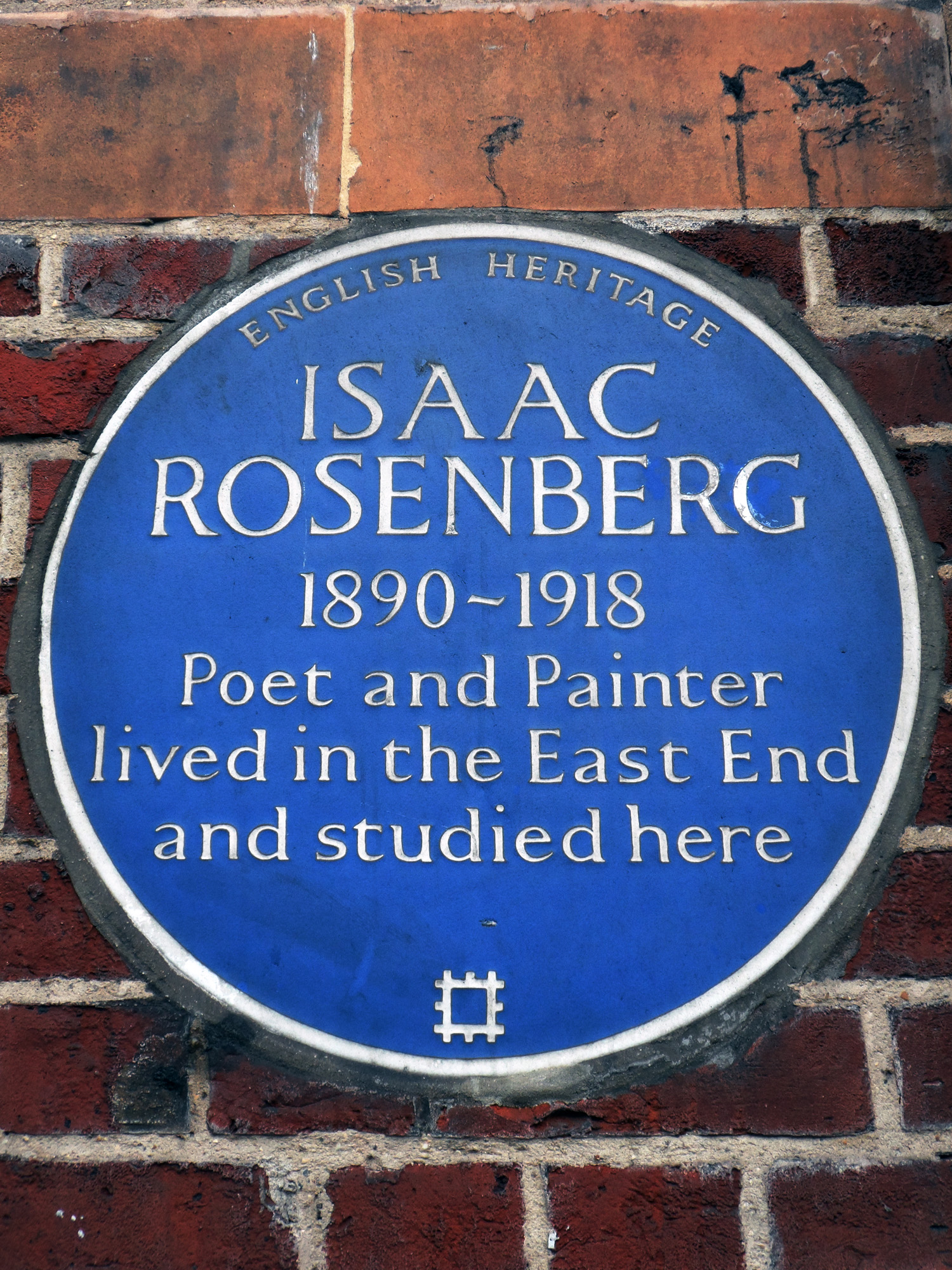
Isaac Rosenberg

=== People inspiring local street names and places ===
- Thomas Barnardo – Victorian philanthropist who established homes for destitute children, founder of Barnardo's: Barnardo Street
- Nicholas Hawksmoor – architect who designed the church of St George in the East: Hawksmoor Mews
- Nathaniel Heckford – a young doctor who founded a local children's hospital: Heckford Street
- Basil Henriques – philanthropist who worked in the area: Henriques Street
- Harriet Martineau – Victorian journalist and writer, populariser of political economy: Martineau Street
- Daniel Solander – Swedish botanist who travelled with James Cook exploring the Pacific islands: Solander Gardens
- Emanuel Swedenborg – Swedish scientist, philosopher and mystic, in the Georgian era: Swedenborg Gardens (a street and a park)

== Neighbouring streets ==
West of Cable Street

- Royal Mint Street – formerly Rosemary Lane (in 1830)

North of Cable Street starting from the west:

- Leman Street – formerly White Lion Street, leading to Leman Street, (in 1830)
- Mill Yard
- Back Church Lane
- Pinchin Street – formerly Thomas Street (in 1862). Historically noteworthy for its curve and arches, showing where the branch of the railway used to run, towards the goods yard to the north west.
- Stute Street
- Christian Street – the barricade created during the Battle of Cable Street was near this street's junction with Cable Street
- Golding Street – formerly Low Grove Street (in 1862)
- Cannon Street Road
- Watney Market – formerly Watney Street (in 1862)
- Watney Street – formerly Charles Street (in 1862)
- Cornwall Street – formerly Upper Cornwall Street (in 1862)
- Shadwell Gardens
- Shadwell Place – formerly Lower Cornwall Street and Sun Court (in 1862)
- Sutton Street – formerly Church Road (in 1862)
- Martineau Street
- Johnson Street
- Poonah Street
- Hardinge Street
- Hardinge Lane
- Devonport Street
- Barnado Street – formerly James Place (in 1862)
- Stepney Causeway
- Pitsea Street – formerly Dorset Street (in 1862)
- Caroline Street
- Ratcliffe Cross Street – formerly Ratcliffe Square and Periwinkle Street (in 1862)
- Boulcott Street – formerly George Street (in 1862)
- Commercial Road – major radial route into Aldgate – runs parallel to Cable Street

East of Cable Street

- Butcher Row – formerly Butcher Row and White Horse Street (in 1862)
- Narrow Street

South of Cable Street, starting from the west:

- Dock Street – already existed as Dock Street in 1830
- Ensign Street – formerly Well Street (in 1862)
- Graces Alley – between Ensign Street and Wellclose Square – home to Wilton's Music Hall
- Fletcher Street – formerly Shorter Street (in 1830 and 1862)
- Wellclose Square – already existed as Wellclose Square in 1830 and 1862
- Hindmarsh Close
- Swedenborg Gardens
- Betts Street – formerly connected Cable Street to The Highway (in 1862)
- Crowder Street – formerly Denmark Street (in 1862)
- Cannon Street Road
- Hawksmoor Mews
- Bluegate Mews – formerly St George's Place (in 1830)
- Library Place – formerly Prospect Place (in 1862)
- Angel Court – in 1862, Angel Gardens was where Bewley Street is now.
- Dellow Street
- Bewley Street – formerly Albert Street (in 1862)
- Sage Street
- Lowood Street
- Solander Gardens
- Twine Court
- King David Lane
- Juniper Street – formerly Juniper Row (in 1862)
- Tarbert Walk
- Glamis Road
- Redcastle Close – formerly Carriage Way (in 1862)
- Glamis Place
- Brodlove Lane – formerly Love Lane (in 1862)
- Elf Row – formerly Elm Row (in 1862)
- Glasshouse Fields – formerly Glasshouse Street (in 1862)
- Schoolhouse Lane
- Heckford Street – formerly Burlington Place (in 1862); no longer connected to Cable Street
- Cranford Street – formerly Harris Court (in 1862)
- Bere Street – formerly connected through to Butcher Row (in 1862)
- Ratcliffe Orchard – formerly The Orchard (in 1862)
- The Highway – formerly Ratcliff Highway. Then St George's Street, High Street (Shadwell), Cock Hill and Broad Street (in 1862).

== Similar streets ==
As Cable Street refers to the fact that originally cables (and such) were made here, often for the maritime industry, it is a name (together with similar names) which can be found in other places (which often have a maritime history):

- Cable Street in Lancaster
- Lijnbaan in Vlaardingen
- Repslagargatan in Stockholm
- Rope Lane in Crewe
- Ropemaker Court in Manchester
- Touwbaan in Leiderdorp and Sliedrecht
