= Harry Neal =

Housebuilder company (1896–1990)

Harry Neal Limited (1896–1990) was a UK-based housebuilder and contractor. The company began building houses in outer London in 1896, becoming an estate developer and a builder of large expensive houses. It also became a general building contractor, later a specialist in the central London market. In the 1980s the firm made substantial commitments to property development and when the recession came in 1990, the firm was forced into liquidation. The company is notable at the contractor for Tobacco Dock, a large development that took place in the derelict Port of London in the late 1980s.

== Early life ==
Harry Neal was born in 1872, the youngest child of John Neill and Ann French of Ibstock in Leicestershire, where his father ran a small bricklaying business. At the age of 17 he followed his brother George to London and was apprenticed as a carpenter. When Harry completed his apprenticeship, he branched out on his own and established an office in Kilburn, London in 1896, the same year that he married. Harry started building houses, either singly or in small groups.

Harry Neal was beginning to build more expensive houses and in 1907 made the significant move up market into the high-priced residential area of Northwood. He bought parcels of land on the 762-acre Eastbury estate and, over the next five years, built properties including six-bedroomed houses selling for £5,000 – around ten times the price of an average house. In 1913 Harry moved further out and purchased land at Oxhey Woods; he was building private houses there until the First World War. With the onset of war, Harry ran down his work and took employment with McAlpine as a contract manager, giving him invaluable experience of larger construction projects.

After the war, Harry gradually resumed his housebuilding not only at Northwood but also nearby Pinner and Ruislip and also further away, to the east of London. In 1923 the firm incorporated as Harry Neal Ltd; the only other director was Harry's youngest son, Godfrey. Godfrey had joined the firm the previous year at the age of 18, training as a bricklayer. The eldest son, Harold, served in the Army after the war and did not join the company until 1928 to the age of 31.

== The inter-war period ==
During the 1920s, with financial backing from the Westminster Bank, Harry Neal Ltd. was able to operate on a larger scale, buying first the Gatehill estate in Northwood. From the late 1920s, the company was also expanding its activities by undertaking non-housing contracts in west London. Examples included shops; Westminster Bank branches; cinemas; public houses; Harrow swimming pool; the Northwood Pinner and District Hospital; and the Northwood Hills railway station. The firm gradually extended its operations into central London, including shops, offices and blocks of flats. Some of the flats were developed by the Company itself. Harry Neal had been slowly buying the freeholds of existing terraced houses in the prestigious Princes Gate. By 1936 he had acquired numbers 7 to 11 inclusive and developed an eight-story block of 28 flats. A matching block was built on the site of numbers 1 to 3 in 1939 and the scheme was finished in 1949 on numbers 4 to 5.

By the mid-1930s a labour force of 500 was on the books and the firm was engaging in substantial building contracts. Around that time, Godfrey took over the building side of the business, leaving his father, already in his 60s, to concentrate on financial and property matters. Godfrey eventually succeeded his father as managing director in 1940 with Harold as Company Secretary.

Mobilisation in World War II substantially reduced both the firm's labour force and the demand for civilian work. Civil defence work started with the construction of air raid shelters for 500 people in Trafalgar Square, the first of many shelters. The Company continued with similar sized contracts, often working for large national contractors.

== Post-war recovery ==
Post war, the priority was bringing staff back into the firm. Strict building controls drastically curtailed private building and the firm concentrated on council house building, often well outside London, and refurbishment work. The American embassy was one of its better-known clients. More organisational change came with the death of Harry Neal in 1951. Although he had not been active in the firm for some years, he had remained chairman. His will directed that Godfrey became chairman and managing director and he also became the largest shareholder. The 1950s saw the third generation enter the firm, Godfrey's son Morton joined in 1955, aged 24, having studied civil engineering. Harold's son Nigel also joined, in his case as a surveyor. Public sector work remained important in the 1950s, one of the most significant being the town centre of Stevenage New Town where the firm was a main contractor.

== Growth through acquisition ==
The 1960s changed the whole scale and scope of the company's operations. In 1962 Morton became managing director, although Godfrey remained as chairman, and Nigel was appointed as a director. That year saw the first of many acquisitions with the purchase of the building firm of Charles R Price. Charles Price was established in 1902 and had a City presence for over fifty years. However, the Prices and many of the management were members of the Plymouth Brethren. Their drift towards the more extreme Exclusive Brethren limited their ability to make social contacts and even to sign contracts. This was to the benefit of Harry Neal for as well as its traditional suburban contracting, the enlarged firm was well placed to enjoy the upsurge in office building in London, Another important acquisition strengthening the firm's London capability was Caxton Reinforced Concrete, which specialised in the design and construction of concrete and hollow tile floors; for instance it supplied all the concrete work for the extension to the Royal Opera House. Other acquisitions gave Harry Neal greater expertise in the finishing trades important in the refurbishment market.

The breadth of trades contained within the firm contrasted with most contractors who sub-contracted many of these functions and it gave the firm a particular advantage within the London market. In the 1970s, contracts continued to increase in size and complexity and included both new construction and large-scale refurbishment work for museums, hotels, hospitals, offices and public housing. The 1960s had also seen the resumption of Harry Neal’ s speculative housing, particularly blocks of luxury flats and this continued.

== Property boom and bust ==
The 1980s saw yet another speculative property boom and Harry Neal and family members participated in this to the full. Two particular projects stand out. A site on the King's Road was purchased in 1983 and given planning permission for 53 large town houses to be known as Charles II Plaza; work started in 1986. In that same year, Harry Neal was awarded its largest ever contract, the £34m redevelopment of Tobacco Dock in London Docklands, to create 265,000 square feet of retail and leisure space. The contract was awarded by Tobacco Dock Developments, a Company controlled by members of the Neal family. The designer was Arup and the contractor was Harry Neal Ltd.

As the boom approached its peak, in 1987, Michael Neal, Morton's only son became managing director, the fourth generation to hold that position. The history of Harry Neal Ltd. was published in 1989: little more than a year later it was in receivership. The accounts for 1998 and 1999 had shown the Company still in profit but the company had entered the property recession with a high level of debt and that debt was accelerating sharply. In January 1991 the Company went into receivership.. Standing out from the widespread liquidity problems were King Charles II Plaza where only three units had been sold and the Tobacco Dock. At the Dock, large amounts for work done were due from the family's development company and Harry Neal had also made advances to Tobacco Dock Developments.

Family members later traded as Harry Neal Holdings specialising in extensions to very large London homes. That Company went into liquidation in 2010.
