= Snowdrops (novel) =

2011 thriller by A. D. Miller

First edition (publ. Atlantic Books)

Snowdrops is a novel by A. D. Miller which was shortlisted for the 2011 Man Booker Prize. It was also shortlisted for the CWA Gold Dagger, the Los Angeles Times Book Awards, the James Tait Black Memorial Prize and the Galaxy National Book Awards. It was the first novel to be nominated for both the Booker and the Gold Dagger. It was translated into 25 languages.

== Plot ==
The novel is set in Moscow in the early 2000s and is written in the form of a first-person narrative by the protagonist, Nick Platt, a British lawyer based in Russia. Nick meets two young women, Masha, with whom he becomes romantically involved, and Katya. The liaison sees him drawn into the underworld of Russia. Miller has described Snowdrops as a "moral thriller", because the reader knows that something bad is going to happen, but is not exactly sure what or how.

== Reception ==
The book received generally positive reviews, with The Guardian writing: "Snowdrops is...a powerful warning of the dangers of staring at something so long that you stop noticing what you're seeing". The Financial Times described it as a "superlative portrait of a country in which everything has its price", which "displays a worldly confidence reminiscent of Robert Harris at his best". The Sunday Telegraph called it "disturbing and dazzling". The novel was selected as a 'book of the year' for 2011 in the Financial Times, the Observer and the Spectator, among other publications.
