= D. J. Taylor (writer) =

British critic, novelist and biographer (born 1960)

D. J. Taylor FRSL
- Born: David John Taylor; 1960 (age 65–66); United Kingdom
- Education: St John's College, Oxford
- Occupations: Critic; novelist; biographer
- Writing career
- Language: English
- Genres: Literary criticism, fiction, biography

David John Taylor FRSL (born 1960) is a British critic, novelist and biographer, who was born and raised in Norwich. He read modern history at St John's College, Oxford.

He has contributed to The Daily Telegraph, The Guardian, The Independent, New Statesman, The Spectator, Private Eye and Literary Review, among other publications. He lives in Norwich with his wife, the fiction writer Rachel Hore, and their three children. He was previously a member of the Norwich Writers' Circle.

Taylor received the Whitbread Award for his 2003 biography of George Orwell. His novel Derby Day was longlisted for the 2011 Man Booker Prize. Theodore Dalrymple, reviewing Taylor's Who Is Big Brother?: A Reader's Guide to George Orwell, concluded that "It deals most sensitively with Orwell's multiple ambiguities without trying to fit them into a Procrustean bed. It informs, enlightens, and entertains. It restores one's faith in the value of criticism."

== Works ==
- Great Eastern Land: From the Notebooks of David Castell (1986), novel
- A Vain Conceit: British Fiction in the 1980s (1989)
- Other People: Portraits from the 90's (1990), with Marcus Berkmann
- Real Life (1992), novel
- After the War: The Novel and England Since 1945 (1993)
- English Settlement (1996), novel
- After Bathing at Baxter's (1997), short stories
- Trespass (1998), novel
- Thackeray (1999), biography
- The Comedy Man (2002), novel
- Pretext 6: Punk of Me (2002), guest editor
- Orwell: The Life (2003), biography
- Kept (2006), novel
- On the Corinthian Spirit: The Decline of Amateurism in Sport (2006)
- Bright Young People: The Rise and Fall of a Generation, 1918–1940 (2007)
- Ask Alice (2009), novel
- At the Chime of a City Clock (2010), novel
- Derby Day (2011), novel
- Secondhand Daylight (2012), novel
- The Windsor Faction (2013), novel
- Wrote for Luck (2015), stories. Galley Beggar Press
- The New Book of Snobs (2016)
- The Prose Factory: Literary Life in England Since 1918 (2016)
- Rock and Roll Is Life (2018), novel
- Lost Girls: Love, War, and Literature, 1939–1951 (2019), collective biography
- Orwell: The New Life (2023), biography
- Who Is Big Brother?: A Reader's Guide to George Orwell (2024)
- Poppyland (2025), short stories
- The King Under the Mountain: In Search of J. R. R. Tolkien (2026)

== Prizes and honours ==
- 1997: Elected Fellow of the Royal Society of Literature
- 1998: Longlisted for Booker Prize for his novel Trespass
- 1999: Winner of a Grinzane Cavour Prize for L'accordo Inglese, the Italian translation of his novel English Settlement
- 2003: Winner of the Whitbread Prize for biography for Orwell: The Life
- 2011: Longlisted for the 2011 Man Booker Prize, for his novel Derby Day.
- 2014: The Windsor Faction winner of the Sidewise Award (tied with Bryce Zabel's Surrounded by Enemies: What If Kennedy Survived Dallas?).
