= Queen Elizabeth Hospital for Children =

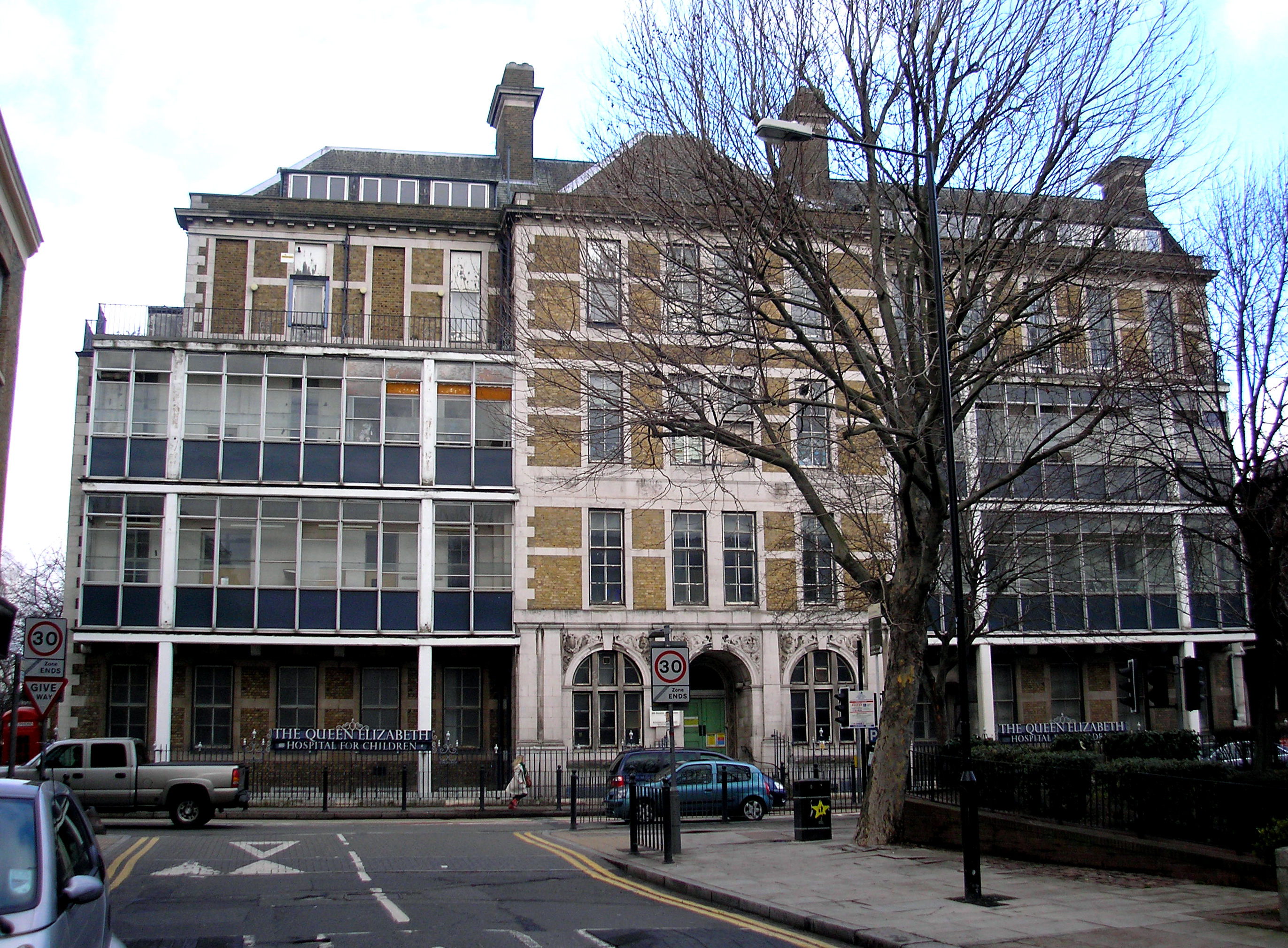
- Queen Elizabeth Hospital for Children

- Shown in Tower Hamlets

Geography
- Location: London, United Kingdom
- Coordinates: 51.53271°N 0.06592°W

Organisation
- Care system: NHS England

History
- Founded: 1867
- Closed: 2014
- Demolished: June 2014 – 2017

Links
- Lists: Hospitals in the United Kingdom

The Queen Elizabeth Hospital for Children was based in Bethnal Green in the London Borough of Tower Hamlets, London. In 1996, the hospital became part of The Royal Hospitals NHS Trust, later renamed Barts and The London NHS Trust. In 1998, the services previously carried out by the hospital were transferred to the Royal London Hospital.

== History ==
The site of the hospital laid in the ancient parish of Shoreditch in Haggerston according to a map prepared in 1850 and 1870. By 1942, the site was in the Metropolitan Borough of Bethnal Green.

The hospital was formed in 1942 by the amalgamation of two institutions founded in the mid-Victorian era.

One of its origins lies in the Dispensary for Women and Children, founded in Bethnal Green in the East End of London by two Quaker sisters, Ellen and Mary Philips, in 1867. The following year it moved to premises in Hackney, re-focused on pediatrics, and was renamed the North Eastern Hospital for Children, opened by Princess Louise. The hospital continued to expand and a substantial new building was opened by Princess Beatrice in 1902. This organisation became the Queen's Hospital for Children in 1907.

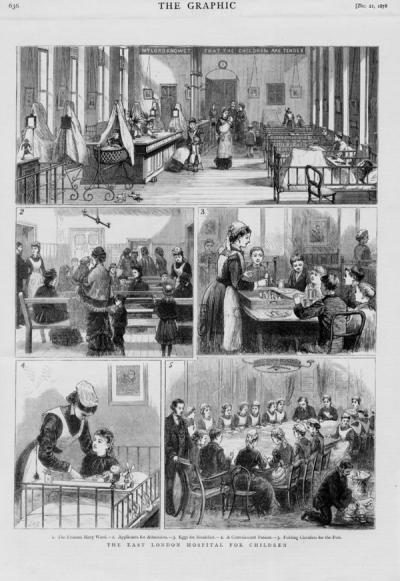
Scenes from the East London Hospital for Children

The other main origin of the 1942 hospital was the East London Hospital for Children, founded by the newly married couple Sarah Maud Heckford and Dr. Nathaniel Heckford in 1868. They had met while assisting patients during the cholera epidemic in 1866. Elizabeth Garrett Anderson, the first English female doctor, was a visiting physician there. In 1932 it was renamed the Princess Elizabeth of York Hospital for Children.

A new site, known as the Banstead Wood Country Hospital, opened in 1936. The Queen's Hospital for Children amalgamated with the Princess Elizabeth of York Hospital for Children to form the Queen Elizabeth Hospital for Children in 1942.

The Shadwell site closed in 1963, the Bethnal Green site closed in 1996, and the Banstead site closed in 1998. Rydon Homes and Family Mosaic Housing Association started the demolition of the old buildings at Bethnal Green and the redevelopment of the site in 2014. A time capsule was discovered there in December 2014, containing newspapers, a catalogue of donors, a hymn sheet and a ribbon from the opening ceremony performed by Princess Beatrice in 1902. By August 2016, the redevelopment of the site was complete with 24 homes standing there.

== Notable staff ==
Kate Evelyn Luard (1872-1962), RRC and bar, trained at The London Hospital in 1896 under Eva Luckes, before training her and undertaking general nurse training at Kings College Hospital. Luard served in the Second Anglo Boer War and First World War, and authored two books about nursing in conflict.

== See also ==
- List of hospitals in England
