= Norwich Writers' Circle =

Writing group in Norwich, England

Norwich Writers' Circle was established in 1943 in Norwich, England, by local group of writers. Its aim is to promote the craft of writing and to create a fellowship amongst writers, locally and nationally.

The group holds meetings twice a month throughout the year, many of which feature visiting writers who set in-house competitions.

Past group members include award-winning biographer D. J. Taylor.
