= Amoria jamrachii =

Scientific classification
- Kingdom: Animalia
- Phylum: Mollusca
- Class: Gastropoda
- Subclass: Caenogastropoda
- Order: Neogastropoda
- Family: Volutidae
- Genus: Amoria
- Subgenus: Amoria
- Species: A. jamrachii

Binomial name
- Amoria jamrachii Gray, 1864

Synonyms
- Amoria jamrachi Gray, 1864; Amoria (Amoria) jamrachi jamrachi Gray, 1864 · accepted, alternate representation; Amoria (Amoria) jamrachii Gray, 1864 · accepted, alternate representation; Amoria jamrachii jamrachi Gray, 1864 · accepted, alternate representation; Amoria turneri jamrachi Gray, 1864; Voluta jamrachi Gray; Voluta pallida Gray, 1845

Species of gastropod

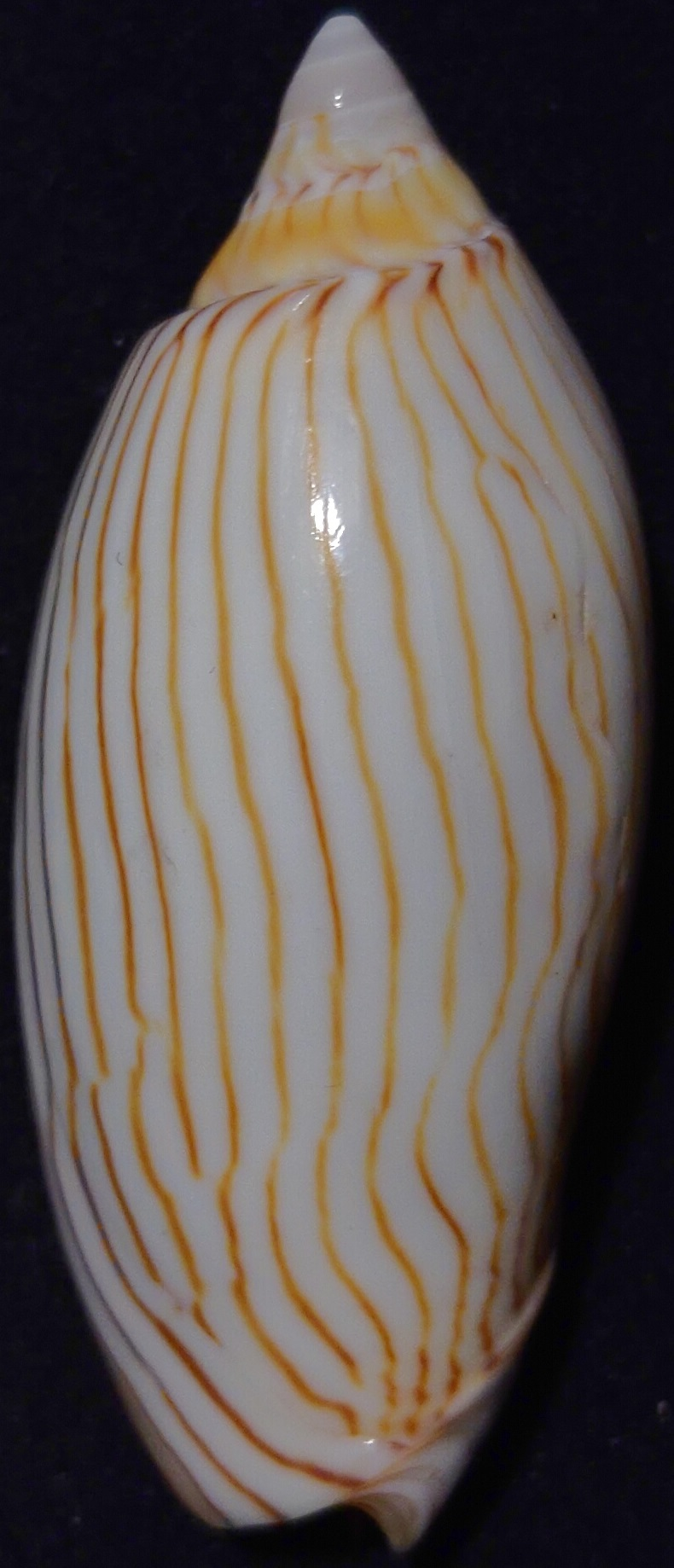

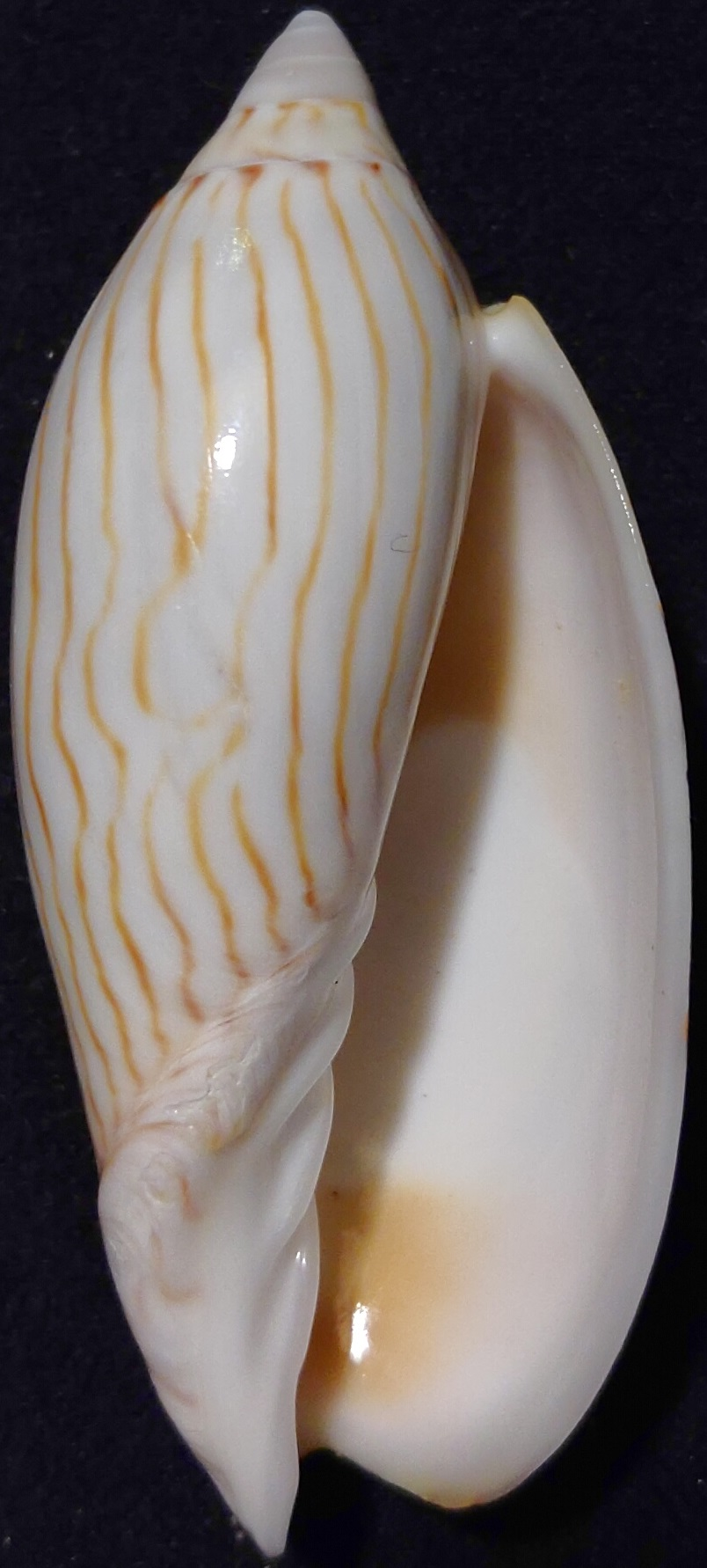

Amoria jamrachii is a species of sea snail, a marine gastropod mollusk in the family Volutidae, the volutes. It was named after Charles Jamrach, an animal dealer in London, by Dr. John Edward Gray, Keeper of Zoology at the British Museum.

== Subspecies ==
- Amoria jamrachi condei Bail & Limpus, 2001
- Amoria jamrachi jamrachi Gray, 1864: represented as Amoria jamrachii Gray, 1864 (alternate representation)

== Description ==
The length of the shell varies between 45 mm and 70 mm.

(Original description) This species closely resembles Amoria turneri, however, it exhibits several key differences. The shell is thinner, the stripes are narrower and more widely spaced, and the sutural spots are either very small or entirely absent.

The shell is oblong-ovate, whitish, and tinged with fulvous. It is longitudinally striated with brown. The spire is conical and acute, but relatively short, with channeled sutures. The aperture is relatively wide and dilated towards the base. The columella exhibits four folds, and the lip is relatively sharp.

== Distribution ==
This marine species occurs off Indonesia and Northwest Australia.
