= Jamrach's Menagerie =

2011 novel by Carol Birch

- Author: Carol Birch
- Published: 2011
- Publisher: Canongate
- Pages: 348 pp.
- ISBN: 1-84767-656-1
- OCLC: 663446126

Jamrach's Menagerie is a 2011 novel by Carol Birch. The novel has been referred to as historical fiction, since it features certain real life characters, such as naturalist Charles Jamrach.

The novel was short-listed for the 2011 Man Booker Prize.

== Plot ==
At the age of eight, Jaffy Brown encounters a tiger escaped from the menagerie of Charles Jamrach, wandering about London's East End. Taken up in the tiger's jaws, he is rescued by Jamrach himself, who then offers Jaffy a job. Jaffy loves working at the menagerie and becomes friends with another employee, Tim Linver. He falls in love with Tim's sister and the three of them grow up together on the streets of London.

Several years later, when Jaffy is sixteen, he and Tim are dispatched by Jamrach to the Dutch East Indies, aboard a whaling ship. Under the charge of Jamrach's seasoned field agent, Dan Rymer, they have been sent to capture a "dragon" for the menagerie. The crew successfully capture the dragon, but on the return voyage it is set loose by Skip, one of the ship's mad crewmen, and after it bites a crew member they are forced to drive it overboard. Later the vessel is struck by a waterspout and sunk, leaving only a dozen men alive, stranded in the Pacific Ocean in two whaleboats. The two boats make for the coast of Chile, and as the crew gradually begin to die of starvation, thirst, sickness and exposure. Eventually only Jaffy, Tim, Skip and Dan are left alive, and they draw straws to see who will be killed (shot) and who will shoot him. Tim draws the marked piece of paper, and Jaffy kills him, an act which will haunt him for the rest of his life. Eventually Skip also dies, and by the time Dan and Jaffy arrive in Chile they are half-dead with exhaustion and half-mad from grief and anguish.

In the book's coda, Jaffy returns home, faces Tim's family, and goes through a long period of depression and ennui. He eventually returns to life as a sailor, and in his retirement constructs a bird menagerie of his own.

== Historical references ==
Charles Jamrach was a real historical figure who operated a menagerie in east London in the 19th century, and at one point a Bengal tiger escaped and took an eight-year-old boy in its mouth. This event is depicted by a statue in Tobacco Dock in Wapping. Jamrach personally rescued the boy from the tiger.

The ordeal of the crew in the lifeboats is largely based on the notorious shipwreck of the whaler Essex, which a sperm whale rammed and sank in 1820. A sixteen-year-old sailor named Charles Ramsdell shot his childhood friend Owen Coffin after the drawing of straws. Coffin, like Tim, insisted on the deal being honoured. Ramsdell survived the incident and returned to life as a sailor.
