= Sarah Maud Heckford =

Anglo-Irish philanthropist, writer, and traveller

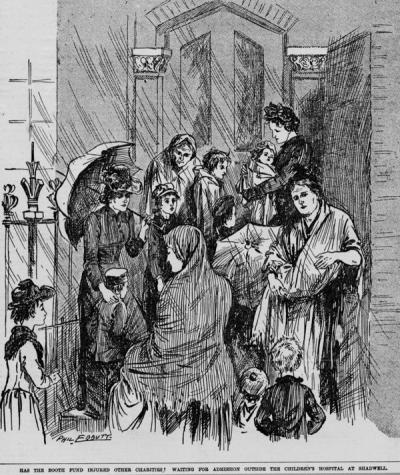
- "Outside the Children's Hospital - Sarah Maud Heckford and her husband founded the East London Children's Hospital
- Born: Sarah Maud Goff; 30 June 1839; Blackrock, Dublin
- Died: 17 April 1903 (aged 63); Pretoria
- Occupation: Writers

Sarah Maud Goff Heckford (30 June 1839 – 17 April 1903) was an Anglo-Irish philanthropist, writer, and traveller. She was co-founder of an East London hospital for women and children, and author of A Lady Trader in the Transvaal (1882).

== Early life ==
Sarah Maud Goff was born in Blackrock, Dublin, the daughter of William Goff and Mary Clibborn. Her father was a banker. Sarah Goff survived tuberculosis as a child, with lasting effects on her posture and gait. By the time she was ten years old, both her parents and her eldest sister had died, and she was living in the care of an aunt and under the guardianship of an uncle, first in Switzerland, then in Paris, and finally in London.

== Career ==
Sarah Maud Goff inherited enough money to live fairly independently in Belgravia, with her older sister, Anne. Sarah and Anne both volunteered as nurses during the cholera epidemic in 1866. Soon after, she co-founded the East London Hospital for Children and Dispensary for Women with her new husband, Nathaniel Heckford. Dr Elizabeth Garrett Anderson was a visiting physician there and Charles Dickens publicized the Heckfords' work in two chapters titled "A Small Star in the East". and "On An Amateur Beat" in his "Uncommercial Traveller". The hospital merged with other institutions and from 1942 was known as the Queen Elizabeth Hospital for Children.

After she was widowed, she continued working on expanding the hospital's offerings, and wrote her first book, The Life of Christ and its Bearing on the Doctrines of Communism (1873).

She set off to travel after hospital business was settled, first to Naples (where her daughter married), then to India, where she worked as an informal medical missionary treating women (see Zenana mission). She moved to South Africa in 1878, hoping to become a farmer, but she discovered that she had been cheated in her arrangements, and took a position as a governess for two years instead. With her earnings she bought a cart and oxen and had some success as an itinerant trader, which she wrote about in another book, A Lady Trader in the Transvaal (1882). She went back to London to publish her first novel, Excelsior (1884), and another book, The Story of the East London Hospital (1887).

She spent her later years in South Africa, starting a new farm in Soutpansberg, and trying her hand at gold mining (the subject of her next book, True Transvaal Tales). She went back to governess work in the late 1890s, and as a harmless-seeming sixty-year-old lady, carried messages for the English during the South African War. In Pretoria, she wrote a study, Report on the educational needs of the Transvaal Colony from the Transvaal Women's Educational Union to the education department of the colony (1901). She gave lectures on a trip to London on South Africa, particularly encouraging teachers to emigrate there (see Women's Emigration Society).

== Personal life ==
Sarah Maud Goff married Nathaniel Heckford, a doctor she met while nursing during the 1866 cholera outbreak, in 1867. She was widowed when he died in 1870, from tuberculosis. She raised an adopted daughter, Marian. Sarah Maud Heckford died in 1903, aged 63 years, in Pretoria.

A full-length biography of Sarah Maud Heckford was published in 1979.
