= Greatfields Park =

Public park in London

Coordinates: 51.531°N 0.090°E

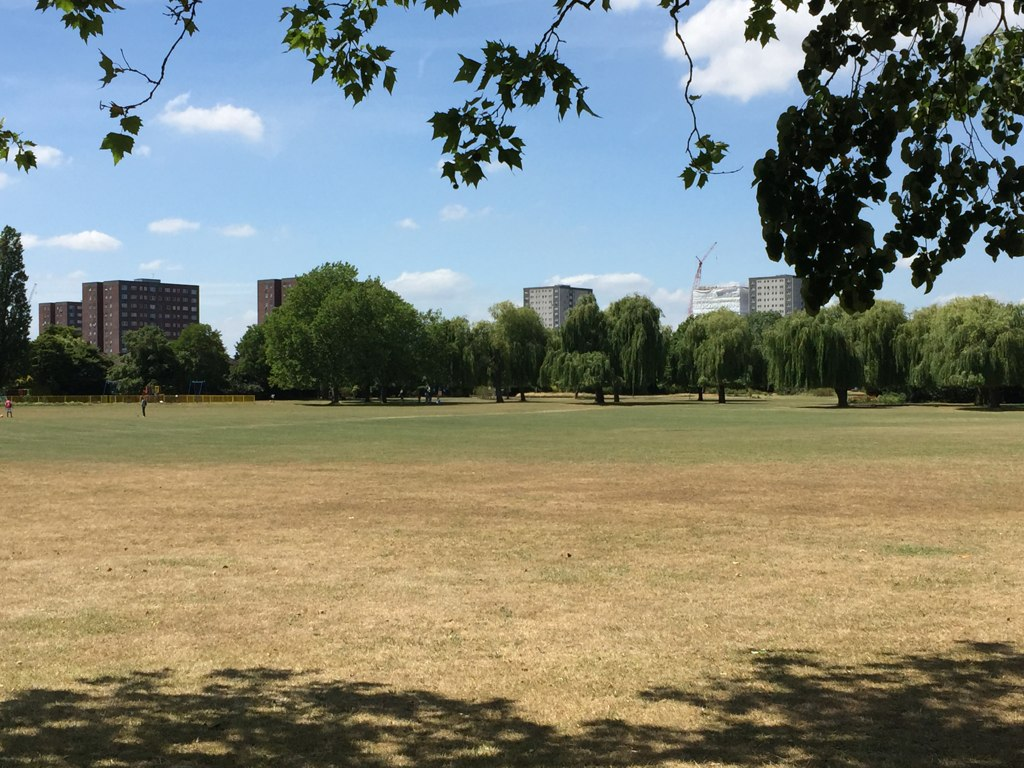
Greatfields Park

Greatfields Park, in the London Borough of Barking and Dagenham, east London, is a public park of just under 6 hectares. It lies just north of the A13 road (Alfreds Way, Barking bypass trunk road), and is bounded on other sides by Greatfields Road, Movers Lane, and Perth Road.

It contains tennis courts, playgrounds, flower gardens, and grass areas for football and other games.

The park was officially opened in 1926, but had already existed for five years as the Movers Lane Playing Field. England international footballer Bobby Moore used to play in the park as a child.

== Sources ==
- The Boroughs parks and open spaces LB Barking and Dagenham, Local studies info sheet #6
