= Andrew Miller (writer) =

British journalist and author (born 1974)

- Born: 1974 (age 51–52); London, United Kingdom
- Education: University of Cambridge; Princeton University
- Occupation: Writer

Andrew Miller (born 1974) is a British journalist and author, best known for his debut novel, Snowdrops, published under the name A.D. Miller. He studied literature at Cambridge and Princeton and worked in television before joining The Economist magazine as a reporter in 2000.

== Fiction ==
Snowdrops, an "amorality tale" set in Moscow, was published in 2011. The story is narrated by Nick Platt, a British lawyer working in Russia in the mid-noughties; Platt becomes involved with a woman he meets on the metro and is caught up in a pair of ruthless scams. It was the first novel to be shortlisted for both the Booker Prize for fiction and the CWA Gold Dagger. The novel was also nominated for the Los Angeles Times Book Awards, the James Tait Black Memorial Prize and the Galaxy National Book Awards.

Snowdrops received generally favourable reviews. A review in the Independent called it "an electrifying tour of the dark side of Moscow, and of human nature". The Financial Times described it as a "superlative portrait of a country in which everything has its price". The novel was translated into 25 languages. It was selected as a 'book of the year' for 2011 in the Financial Times, the Observer and the Spectator, among other publications.

The Faithful Couple, Miller's second novel, was published in 2015. A review in the Financial Times called it "gripping, affecting and memorable". The Times said it was "studded with little zingers or evocative phrases that encapsulate something bigger". Miller's third novel, Independence Square, set during the Orange Revolution in Kyiv, was published in 2020. In the Spectator, David Patrikarakos said it was "a book about truth and lies, about dirty money and the manipulation of politics". In The Guardian, Marcel Theroux said "Independence Square made me think of a 21st-century Graham Greene novel, an absorbing thriller informed by emotional intelligence and a deep understanding of geopolitics". In the Washington Post, Ron Charles described it as "a double helix of espionage and regret".

== Non-fiction ==
Miller's first book, published in 2006, was The Earl of Petticoat Lane, a family memoir about "immigration, class, the Blitz, love, memory and the underwear industry". It was shortlisted for the Wingate Prize for books on Jewish themes.

In the Sunday Times, Susie Boyt called the book "family history of the best sort, the subject matter vastly appealing, the writing intelligent and clear...At the heart of this memoir looms the extraordinary figure of Miller's grandfather, whom the author presents with a novelist's sensitivity and power". In the New Statesman, Linda Grant said "there are three good reasons to buy and read this book: first, it must be the best-documented account of the class trajectory of British Jewry in the 20th century; second, it throws valuable light on contemporary debates about immigration and asylum... and third, it is a fantastically interesting and well-written story”.

Miller is the author of introductions to novellas by Dostoevsky and Tolstoy for the Hesperus Press. He has served as a judge for the Pushkin House Russian Book Prize, for non-fiction about the Russian world (2013), and for the Wingate Prize (2021).

== Journalism ==
At The Economist, Miller originally wrote about British politics and culture. In 2004, he was appointed Moscow correspondent, and covered, among other things, the Yukos affair and the Orange Revolution. He returned to the UK in 2007 to become The Economist's political editor and Bagehot columnist. He has since been the magazine's correspondent in the American South and its Culture Editor. Since 2021 he has written Back Story, The Economist's biweekly column on culture.

Miller has written for the Financial Times, Wall Street Journal, Guardian, Observer, Daily Telegraph and Spectator, among other publications. In 2014, "Midnight in Nowheresville", his article about spending 24 hours at a motorway service station, won Travel Story of the Year at the Foreign Press Association Media Awards.
