= Nathaniel Heckford =

British doctor

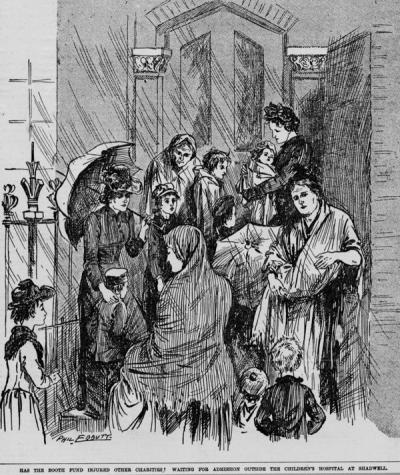
Outside the children's hospital, Shadwell

Nathaniel Heckford (1842–1871) was a paediatrician in Victorian London, who founded the East London Hospital for Children. He met his future wife, Sarah Goff, during the 1866 cholera epidemic in Wapping, where he first determined a need for a children's hospital in the East End of London. Heckford died of tuberculosis (then known as consumption) at the age of 29.

The hospital started in 1868 in a warehouse in Ratcliffe, and moved after his death to Glamis Road, Shadwell. It was the first London hospital for children under two years of age. It was described in some detail by Charles Dickens in two pieces called 'A Small Star in the East' and 'On An Amateur Beat' published in The Uncommercial Traveller.

In 1932 it was renamed the Princess Elizabeth of York Hospital for Children. A decade later, it amalgamated with the Queen's Hospital for Children, which had been founded in 1867 as the Dispensary for Women and Children. The newly merged institution was called Queen Elizabeth Hospital for Children until its closure in 1963.

Heckford Street, off the east end of The Highway, commemorates Dr. Heckford. Created in the early 21st century, it is a small business park, mostly occupied by electrical and building trades.

== Sources ==
- "East London Hospital for Children" by V.A.J. Swain (PDF file—contains artist's rendering of the East London Hospital around 1900)
- Portrait of Dr. Heckford
