= Tobacco Dock =

Depot in Wapping, London, England

Coordinates: 51°30′29.92″N 00°03′34.02″W

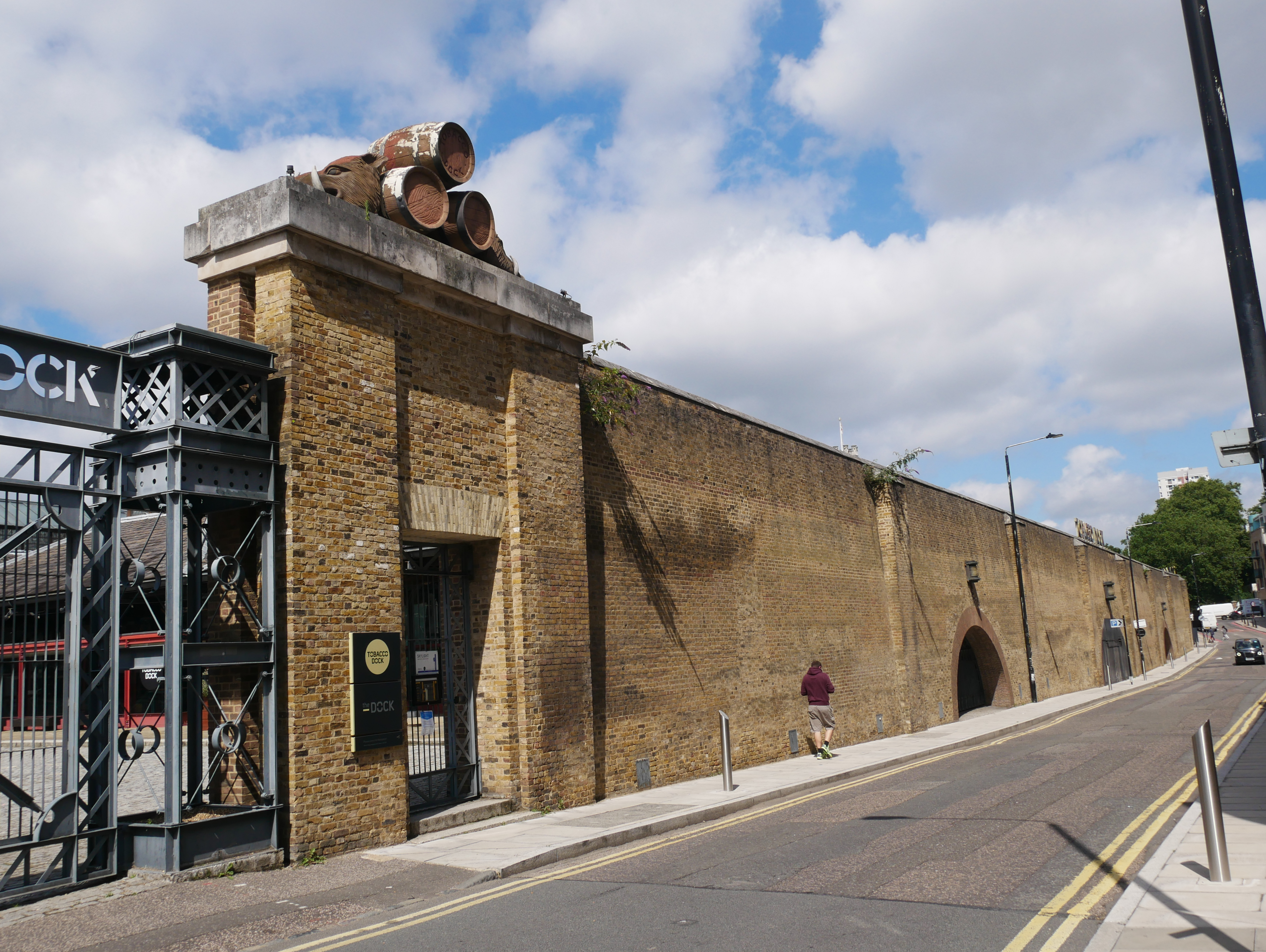
The east wall around Tobacco Dock

Tobacco Dock is a Grade I listed warehouse located at Wapping, in the London Borough of Tower Hamlets. Located in the East End of London, it was designed by Scottish civil engineer and architect John Rennie, the warehouse was completed in 1812 and primarily served as a store for imported tobacco, hence the name. During the early 20th century, economic activity in the area fluctuated due to World War I and World War II, and both London Docks and nearby St Katharine Docks had closed by 1969.

After the Port of London ceased seaborne trade, the warehouse and surrounding areas fell into dereliction until it was turned into a shopping centre which opened in 1989. However, due to the early 1990s recession, it was forced to close two years later. In 2003 English Heritage placed it on its "at risk" register, preventing many developers from attempting a rejuvenation of the former London Docklands site. For two decades Tobacco Dock stood largely empty; it was used as a barracks for military personnel providing security to the 2012 London Olympics.

In 2012 the company Tobacco Dock Ltd launched the building as an events and conferencing space for up to 10,000 people. It also houses offices and co-working spaces operated by Tobacco Dock Venue Ltd, although the site and building itself are owned by Kuwaiti Real Estate Group Al Mubarakia Ltd.

== History and usage ==
The London Dock Company was initially established in January 1796 by a group of merchants, shippers and bankers and upon the drawing up of plans for the London Docks the company negotiated a 21-year monopoly on the management of vessels carrying rice, tobacco, wine and brandy. This excluded those coming from the East and West Indies, which were managed by the East India Company.

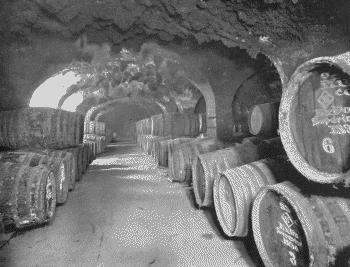
The wine vaults of Tobacco Dock

The vaults beneath the tobacco warehouses resembled the crypts of a Gothic cathedral, "with chamfered granite columns under finely-executed brick groins, connected with a 20-acre "subterranean city" for the storage of wines and spirits, where they could mature at a stable temperature of 15.5 °C".

There was storage for around 8 million gallons of wine and on 30 June 1849 the Dock contained 14,783 pipes of port; 13,107 hogsheads of sherry; 64 pipes of French wine; 796 pipes of Cap wine; 7607 cases of wine, containing 19,140 dozen; 10,113 hogsheads of brandy; and 3642 pipes of rum.

In Victorian England it was possible to obtain a permit from the London Dock Company to visit the vaults, although women were not admitted after 1pm and wine merchants provided visitors with tasting orders that allowed them to sample the various wines, brandies, spirits and ports that were in storage. Now only four of the original vaults survive. "Later, from the 1860s, the ground floor of the warehouse was predominantly used for wool, furs and skins – hence the name "Skin Floor" – and cork and molasses". In his ''Being Notes of Common Life and Pastoral Work in Saint James's, Westminster and in Saint Georges'-in-the-East'', the Reverend Harry Jones, Rector of Saint Georges'-in-the-East (Smith Elder & Co, London 1875) noted that an army of about 300 cats were "employed" to control the number of rats in the Dock.

The Docks abound with rats, and an army of about three hundred cats is employed to keep them down. Besides these you find dogs. Some little time ago I came on a famous one with her litter of puppies, close by the 'bowl' of our Queen's Pipe. Her owner volunteered a record of some of her performances in the rat-killing way, and fondly enumerated the number she had slain. But, like a true Englishman, he had his grievance. I learned that the Company does not pay for or provide the keep of the dogs, while it seems to be at the expense of extensive orders for cat's meat. I should have thought dogs would have needed food, while cats could have kept themselves.

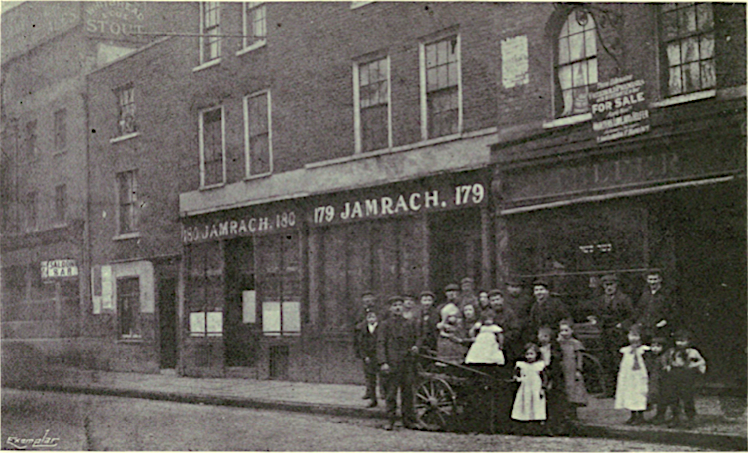
Jamrach's Emporium on Ratcliffe Highway

The former street side entrance to the London Docks was from Ratcliffe Highway which is now known simply as The Highway; due to it being a Roman road it was well suited for its usage as a trading centre for the port. Although it was rather notorious for prostitution and other nefarious activities as many of the sailors coming in from their long voyages were single men looking for drink and a woman, with plenty of cash to spare and the taverns and brothels along its length provided for their every need. In 1600 John Stow described it as "a continual street, or filthy straight passage, with alleys of small tenements or cottages builded, inhabited by sailors and victualers". One such shop along Ratcliffe Highway was German-born wild animal trader Charles Jamrach's "Jamrach's Animal Emporium", which also served as a museum.

Jamrach also owned a menagerie in Betts Street and a warehouse in Old Gravel Lane, Southwark; he was a leading importer, breeder and exporter of animals, selling to noblemen, zoos, menageries and circus owners, and buying from ships docking in London and nearby ports, with agents in other major British ports, including Liverpool, Southampton and Plymouth, and also in continental Europe. In 1857 a wild Bengal tiger escaped from its box as it was waiting to be loaded into its new den and carried off a young boy of around nine years of age who tried to stroke it. Upon his command, one of Jamrach's men brought a crowbar and struck the tiger three times until it released the boy. However, it was only stunned and jumped up again once Jamrach prised the boy from its jaws; so, after a final blow Jamrach and his men managed to return the tiger to its den largely unharmed.

Hospital reports showed that the boy was unharmed yet Jamrach offered his father, a tailor, £50 in compensation "for the alarm he had sustained". Despite this he sued Jamrach for damages which ended up costing £300: £60 for the father and £240 for the lawyers. Jamrach eventually sold the tiger to Mr. Edmonds of Wombell's menagerie for £300, who made a fortune by exhibiting it as the tiger that swallowed a child.

At the north entrance of Tobacco Dock there now stands a 7-foot-tall (2.1 m) bronze sculpture of a boy standing in front of a tiger to commemorate the incident.

== Architecture ==
=== Site and plan ===
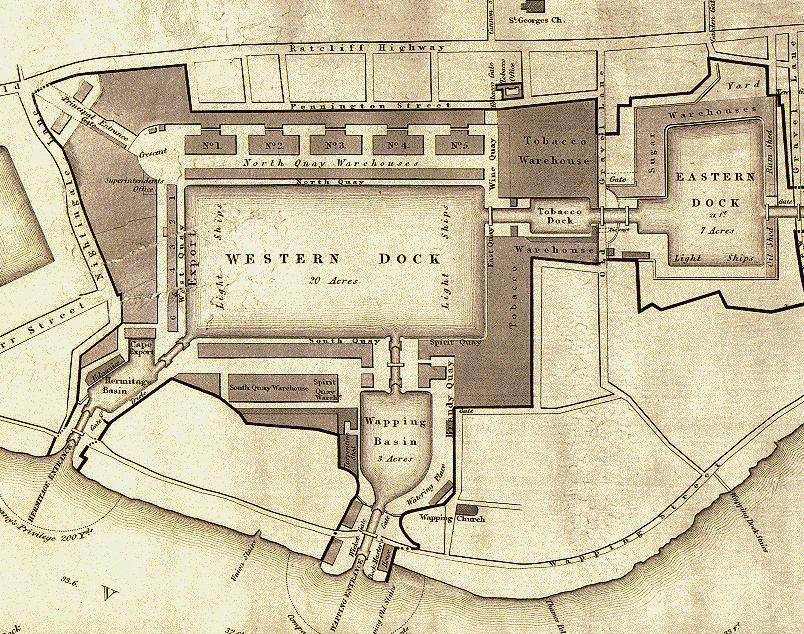
Plan drawing of London Docks in 1831. Tobacco Dock is the large building marked 'Tobacco Warehouse'.

The name Tobacco Dock comes from its original use as a warehouse built to store tobacco and other valuable imports from the New World. It made up part of The London Docks for which plans were first proposed in 1800 when the London Dock Act was passed authorising the building of a wet dock in Wapping, the initial cost of the docks was £4 million. While the majority of the wet dock was built on drainage fields, many houses as well as the former site of the Raine's Foundation School were demolished to make way for warehouses, offices and quays, one of such warehouses is now Tobacco Dock. This resulted in many people being made homeless due to a compulsory purchase order being made for the land by the London Dock Company. Part of the St. John's Churchyard was also used in the creation of the docks, resulting in a need to rebury some of the dead. In Harper's New Monthly Magazine it was written that The London Docks were made up of more than 100 acres with space for more than 500 ships, and warehouses capable of holding 234,000 tons of goods, with the capital of the company alone exceeding £4 million.

=== Style ===
Although the homes built for dock staff on the Pier Head are a classic example of late Georgian architecture, most specifically of the Regency era, the dock itself deterred would be thieves with its prison-like design.

=== Features ===
One of the most notable features of Tobacco Dock that can be seen from the outside are the high walls surrounding the whole structure, costing £65,000. They are a result of the strict storage and import laws relating to tobacco and liquor, which were (and still are) subjected to excise duty; hence, it was required that they be kept in bonded warehouses with strict security measures. Another reason for the virtually impenetrable walls was defence; piracy was rampant in the 19th century and professional bandits such as The River Pirates, the Night Plunderers, the Scuffle-Hunters and the Mud Larks patrolled the waters and ports in search of a victim. Due to massive congestion on the river there was often around 1,800 boats moored in a space meant for 500.

This thievery may have influenced the decision to hire Daniel Asher Alexander - who was the principal architect of both Dartmoor Prison and Maidstone Prison - to design The London Dock, as well as act as the principle surveyor.

"The Great Tobacco Warehouse" was also known as the Queen's Warehouse; hence, the furnace at its centre earned the moniker of "The Queen's Tobacco Pipe" as it was used to burn defective tobacco and other unusable goods as well as those which had not had their duty paid. John Timbs' Curiosities of London (1867) records:

Near the north-east corner of the Queen's Warehouse, a guide-post, inscribed 'To the Kiln', directs you to 'the Queen's Pipe', or chimney of the furnace; on the door of the latter and of the room are painted the crown-royal and VR. In this kiln are burnt all such goods as do not fetch the amount of their duties and the Customs' charges: tea, having once set the chimney of the kiln on fire, is rarely burnt; and the wine and spirits are emptied into the Docks. The huge mass of fire in the furnace is fed night and day with condemned goods: on one occasion, 900 Austrian mutton-hams were burnt; on another, 45,000 pairs of French gloves; and silks and satins, tobacco and cigars, are here consumed in vast quantities: the ashes being sold by the ton as manure, for killing insects, and to soap-boilers and chemical manufacturers. Nails and other pieces of iron, sifted from the ashes, are prized for their toughness in making gun-barrels; gold and silver, the remains of plate, watches, and jewellery thrown into the furnace, are also found in the ashes.

== Redevelopment ==
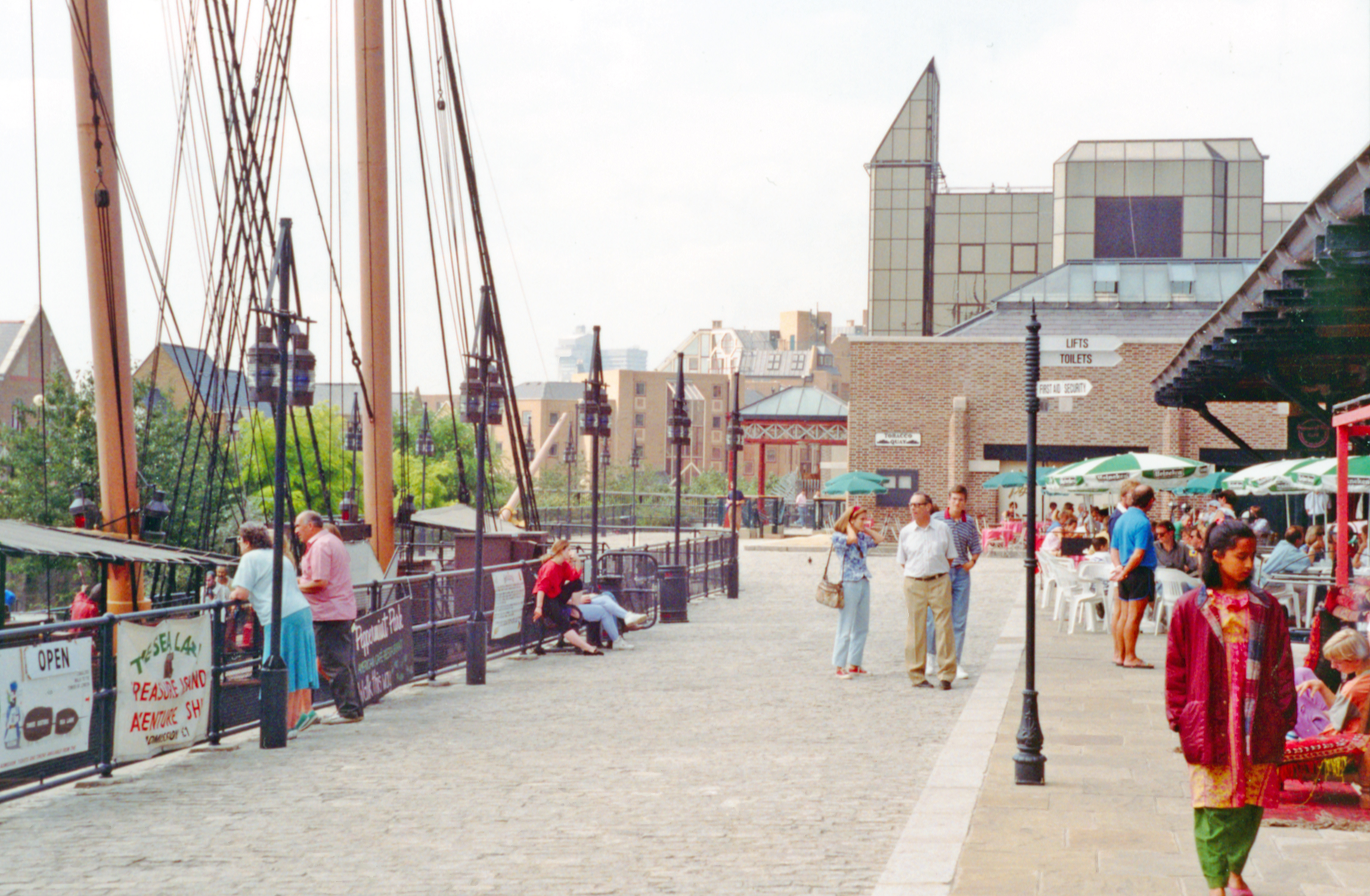
Tobacco Dock in 1991

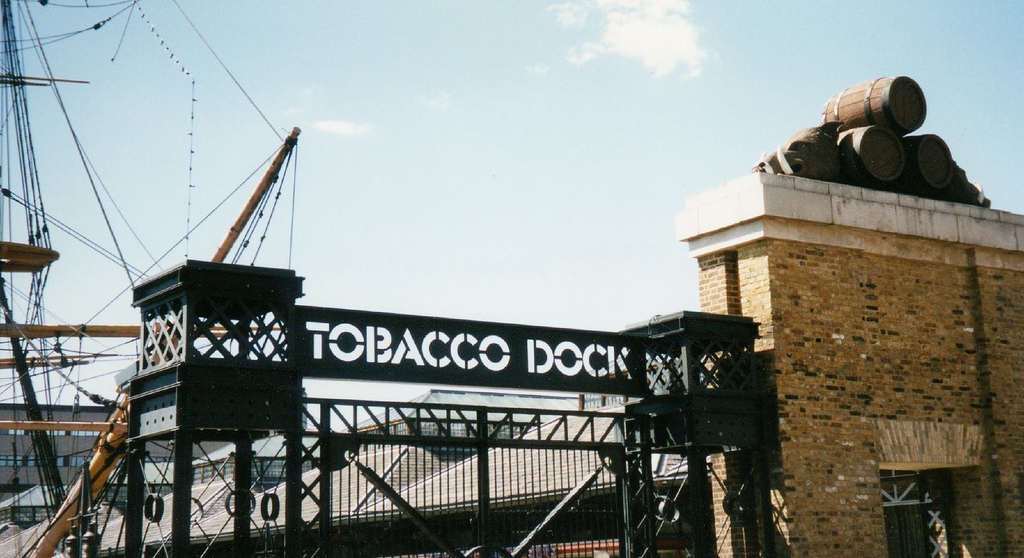
Entrance to Tobacco Dock

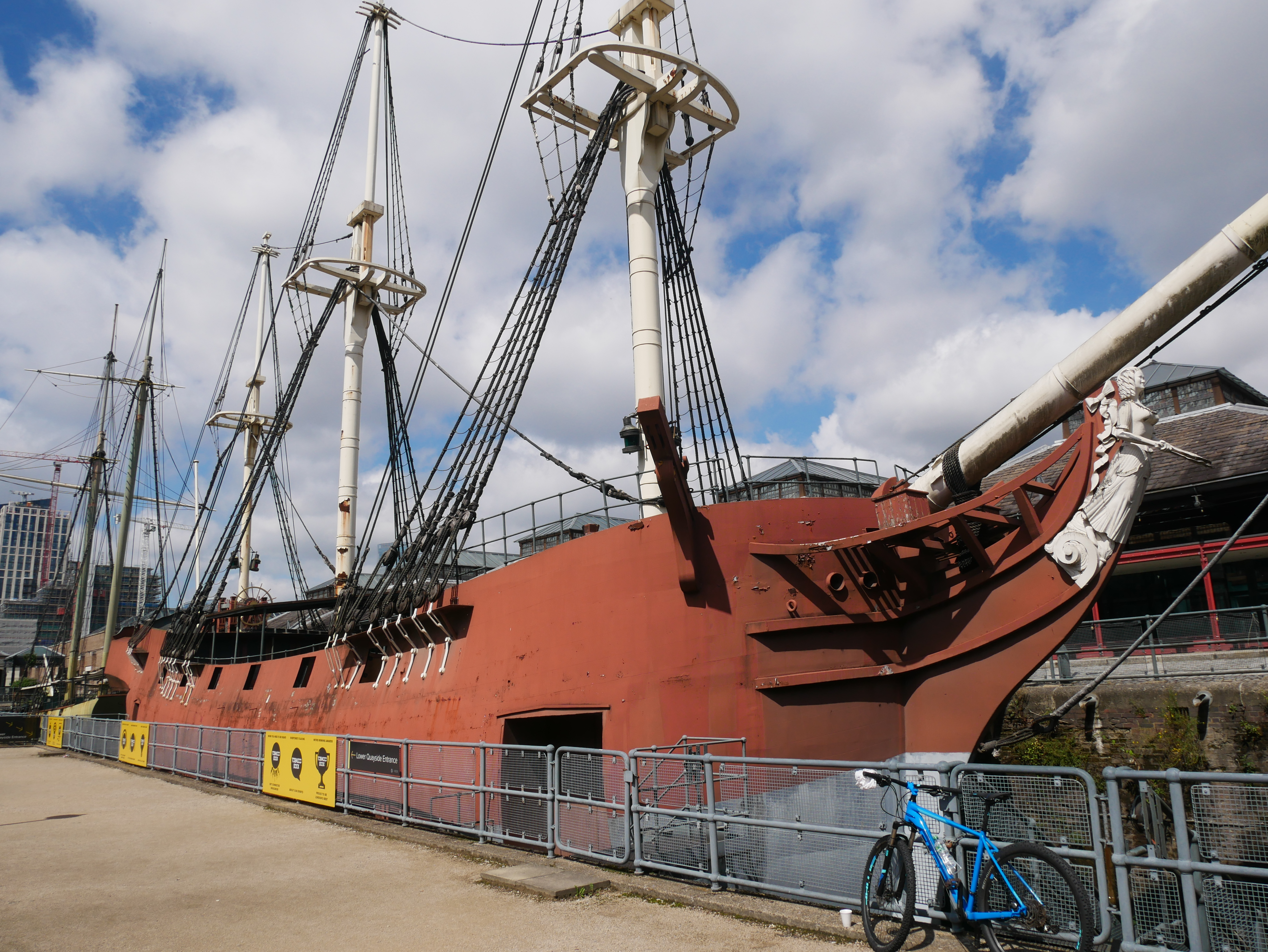
The Three Sisters, located on the south of Tobacco Dock

In 1990 the structure was converted into a shopping centre at a cost of £47 million; it was the intention of the developers to create the "Covent Garden of the East End", however the scheme was unsuccessful and it went into administration. This is likely due, in part, to the fact that Tobacco Dock is not in a major retail area and has only moderately good public transport access. The designer was Arup and the contractor was Harry Neal Ltd. Two replica ships, the Sea Lark and the Three Sisters, were also built at the shopping centre for children to be entertained and educated about the history of piracy.

From the mid-1990s the building was almost entirely unoccupied, with the only tenant being a sandwich shop, and a plan to convert it into a factory outlet did not come to fruition. In 2003, English Heritage placed Tobacco Dock on the Buildings at Risk Register to prevent inappropriate development and decay due to neglect, although at this time it was already a listed building. A meeting was arranged in 2004 to discuss the building with its owners, the Kuwaiti investment company Messila House, to ensure the survival of the historic structure. An English Heritage spokesman commented: "we see Tobacco Dock as a future priority because it is too large and important a site to be left standing empty. It is one of the most important buildings in London and if brought back into use it would reinvigorate the whole area".

In 2005 the owners announced that they were working on a mixed-use scheme for Tobacco Dock which could incorporate a four-star hotel, shops, and luxury apartments. As of July 2012, the upper areas of the complex were still accessible to the general public whilst the majority of the lower areas were cordoned off.

=== Event and film location ===
In 1980 the upper floor of Tobacco Dock was used as the filming location for the music video "Messages" by the band Orchestral Manoeuvres in the Dark. In 1992, various parts of the building were used to film the exercise video Body Blitz starring Tessa Sanderson and Derrick Evans. In early 2004, part of the building was used as the studios of the Channel 4 reality television show Shattered. Several film première after-parties have also been held there. Tobacco Dock was used for scenes in the sixth episode of the 2008 BBC drama Ashes to Ashes, set in 1981 despite the centre only being developed for its failed use as a shopping centre in 1990. In February 2011 the complex was used to hold a Secret Cinema event for The Red Shoes.

In the summer of 2012 the Ministry of Defence used Tobacco Dock as temporary accommodation for 2,500 soldiers deployed to guard the Olympic Games in London.

== Current use ==
Tobacco Dock is regularly used for large corporate and commercial events and is a smoke free venue, including its attached car park.

- In November 2013 and 2014 it was used to host RuneFest 3 and 4 respectively, an event celebrating RuneScape, an online role-playing video game.
- From 2013 it was the venue of the annual live-fire food event Meatopia where chefs from around the world cook for over 10,000 people over a weekend.
- Since 2014, the British Academy Games Awards were held every spring as part of EGX Rezzed.

== See also ==
- Stanley Dock Tobacco Warehouse, in Liverpool; the world's largest brick warehouse
- Stepney Historical Trust
