= Dan Jones (human rights education activist) =

British artist and human rights activist

The Honourable Dan Jones MBE
- Education: Leighton Park School
- Occupations: Painter, Illustrator
- Spouse: Denise Jones
- Parents: Elwyn Jones (father); Pearl Binder (mother)

Daniel Elwyn Jones MBE is a British artist, collector of children's playground songs and human rights campaigner. He is an education advisor for the human rights organisation Amnesty International.

== Amnesty International ==
Jones is one of Amnesty International's longest-term supporters, having assisted Peter Benenson and his father, Elwyn Jones, to help launch Amnesty in 1961 which at the time they believed to be an ambitious one-year campaign.

He was awarded an MBE in 2001 for services to international human rights, and was nominated as a local hero and reached the finals of the 14th Pride of Britain Awards. He continues to work for Amnesty. In his current role as an education advisor he visits schools and speaks to students to help educate in the fundamentals of human rights.

== Art ==
Jones has produced paintings, murals, political posters and banners for trade unions and local causes, as well as illustrating two books of nursery rhymes, Inky, Pinky, Ponky and Mother Goose comes to Cable Street.

Many of his paintings and murals depict East End life and capture much of the social and political history of the area over the last 50 years. Jones's subjects include political demonstrations from East End history up to the present, from the Poplar Rates Rebellion of 1921, the Blair Peach funeral march in 1979, to the anniversary of the Battle of Cable Street in 1996.

Jones instigated the creation of the Cable Street Mural, whilst Secretary of the Tower Hamlets Trades Council.

He is featured in East End Vernacular, Artists Who Painted London's East End Streets in the 20th Century.

== Playground songs ==
Jones has been an avid collector of children's playground songs, over many decades. In 2018 he lodged his collection at the British Library Sound Archive. His collection was a long-term exhibit at the V&A Museum of Childhood and he has given a number of talks and interviews on the subject, including a contribution to the BBC Radio 4 programme A Sailor Went to Sea Sea Sea.

== Family life ==
Jones is the son of the artist Pearl "Polly" Binder and the barrister and Labour politician, Elwyn Jones. He was educated at Leighton Park School. He has two sisters, Josephine and Lou.
