= Cable Street Mural =

Mural by Dave Binnington in London, England

- Cable Street Mural on the side of St George's Town Hall
- Artist: Dave Binnington, Paul Butler, Ray Walker, Desmond Rochfort
- Completion date: 1983
- Medium: Paint on brick
- Movement: Social realism
- Subject: Battle of Cable Street
- Dimensions: 15 m × 20 m (50 ft × 65 ft)
- Location: London; 51.511013°N 0.058644°W

The Cable Street Mural is a large mural painting in the London Borough of Tower Hamlets in East London. It was painted on the side of St George's Town Hall, the former administrative centre of the St George in the East area of Wapping. It was painted by Dave Binnington, Paul Butler, Ray Walker and Desmond Rochfort between 1979 and 1983 to commemorate the Battle of Cable Street in 1936. The original design was by Dave Binnington.

== Background ==
The Battle of Cable Street took place on Sunday 4 October 1936 against the backdrop of the Spanish Civil War, and at a moment when fascist powers were rising across Europe.

Approximately 250,000 East Londoners of all backgrounds took to the streets to block a provocative march, through an area with many Jewish residents, by the antisemitic British Union of Fascists, which was led by Oswald Mosley. Most of the violence occurred between Metropolitan Police and those attempting to block the Fascist route. The Police failed to clear a route through either Aldgate or Cable Street, and told the BUF they would instead have to march to the West End.

== Creation ==
Planning for the mural began in 1976, when Dan Jones, Secretary of the Tower Hamlets Trades Council, saw the Royal Oaks Mural under the Westway in west London, and asked the artist, Dave Binnington, to paint a mural in Cable Street.

A grant from the Arts Council allowed Binnington to undertake research before a public meeting in October 1978 to unveil his design. The local population were generally supportive, although a letter to a local paper described the proposed mural as "political graffiti". Binnington also recruited Paul Butler to design the lower section. Many of the faces in the mural were inspired by newspaper pictures of people who took part in the battle.

Funding from Greater London Arts Association, the E. Vincent Harris Fund for Mural Decoration, the Gulbenkian Foundation, the Leonard Cohen Trust, Greater London Council and the Royal Academy allowed work to start.

Binnington began painting in late 1979 with a targeted completion date of October 1980. He found it more complicated and time-consuming than expected, and work continued through 1980 and 1981. The uncompleted mural was vandalised on 23 May 1982, when right-wing slogans were painted on lower parts of the wall. Binnington abandoned the project in disgust. He later became a furniture designer, and adopted his wife's surname to become David Savage.

Work resumed in July 1982 with Paul Butler helped by Ray Walker and Desmond Rochfort (who had worked with Binnington before on the Royal Oaks Mural). The top was completed to Binnington's design, and the vandalised lower portions were sand-blasted and repainted to a modified design. The mural was completed in March 1983 and officially unveiled on 7 May 1983 by Paul Beasley, Leader of Tower Hamlets Council, with Jack Jones (former General Secretary of the Transport and General Workers Union), Tony Banks (Chair of the Greater London Council Arts Committee) and Dan Jones.

The mural has been vandalised and restored several times, and was restored again by Butler for the 75th anniversary of the Battle of Cable Street in October 2011.

== Mural ==
The mural is painted on approximately 3,500 square feet (330 m^{2}) of rendered wall outside 236 Cable Street, E1 0BL, next to Library Place, about 150 yards (140 m) west of Shadwell railway station. It covers about 65 × 50 feet (20 × 15 m) of one side of St George's Town Hall. The artists used 150 imperial gallons (680 L; 180 US gal) of paint, at a cost of £18,000.

The work is inspired by the social realism of Diego Rivera, and the likely was influenced by the Depression-era murals of Philip Guston. Using a fisheye perspective, it shows the violent confrontation between police and protesters, with protest banners, punches being thrown, a barricade of furniture and overturned vehicle, police horse, Hitler (who was not actually present) being pantsed, and a police autogyro overhead. It uses the same artistic devices as Goya's The Third of May 1808 to evince sympathy for the protesters, showing them full face but a back view of the police.
