= Carol Birch =

English novelist, educator and critic (born 1951)

Carol Birch (born 1951) is an English novelist, lecturer and book critic. She also teaches creative writing.

== Life ==
Birch was born in Manchester, England. Her parents had met in a wartime armaments factory. Her father, a metallurgist, also played trombone in a Manchester jazz band known as The Saints. She took English and American Studies at Keele University. After a period in the Waterloo area of London (which would be the setting for her first novel), she moved to County Cork, Ireland, with her first husband, an artist, taking his name Birch and turning to writing, but she returned to London, where the marriage ended.

Birch and her second husband, Martin Butler, moved back to the North West in 1989. She currently lives with her family in Lancaster, where her husband teaches at Lancaster and Morecambe College.

== Awards ==
The author of twelve novels, Birch won the 1988 David Higham Award for the Best First Novel of the Year for Life in the Palace, and the Geoffrey Faber Memorial Prize with The Fog Line in 1991; Her novel Turn Again Home was on the long list for the 2003 Man Booker Prize. Her novel Jamrach's Menagerie was long-listed for the Orange Prize 2011, and shortlisted for the Man Booker Prize 2011, and an extract from it appeared in The New York Times.

In 2014, Birch was awarded an honorary degree of D.Litt. by Lancaster University.

== Influences ==
Among the working-class writers to whom Birch acknowledges a debt are the fellow Lancastrians Shelagh Delaney and Louis Golding, and the Welshman Howard Spring. Several of her novels have been translated into German, and Jamrach's Menagerie into Romanian. Birch also teaches creative writing and contributes reviews to a number of newspapers.

== Works ==
- Life in the Palace (1988)
- The Fog Line (1989)
- The Unmaking (1992)
- Songs of the West (1994)
- Little Sister (1998)
- Come Back, Paddy Riley (1999)
- Turn Again Home (2003)
- In a Certain Light (2004)
- The Naming of Eliza Quinn (2005)
- Scapegallows (2007): A novel based on the life of Margaret Catchpole
- Jamrach's Menagerie (2011)
- Orphans of the Carnival (2016)
- Cold boy's wood (London, 2021) ISBN 9781838939410
- Shadow girls (London, 2022) ISBN 9781838939458
