= Elizabeth Stirling =

English organist and composer

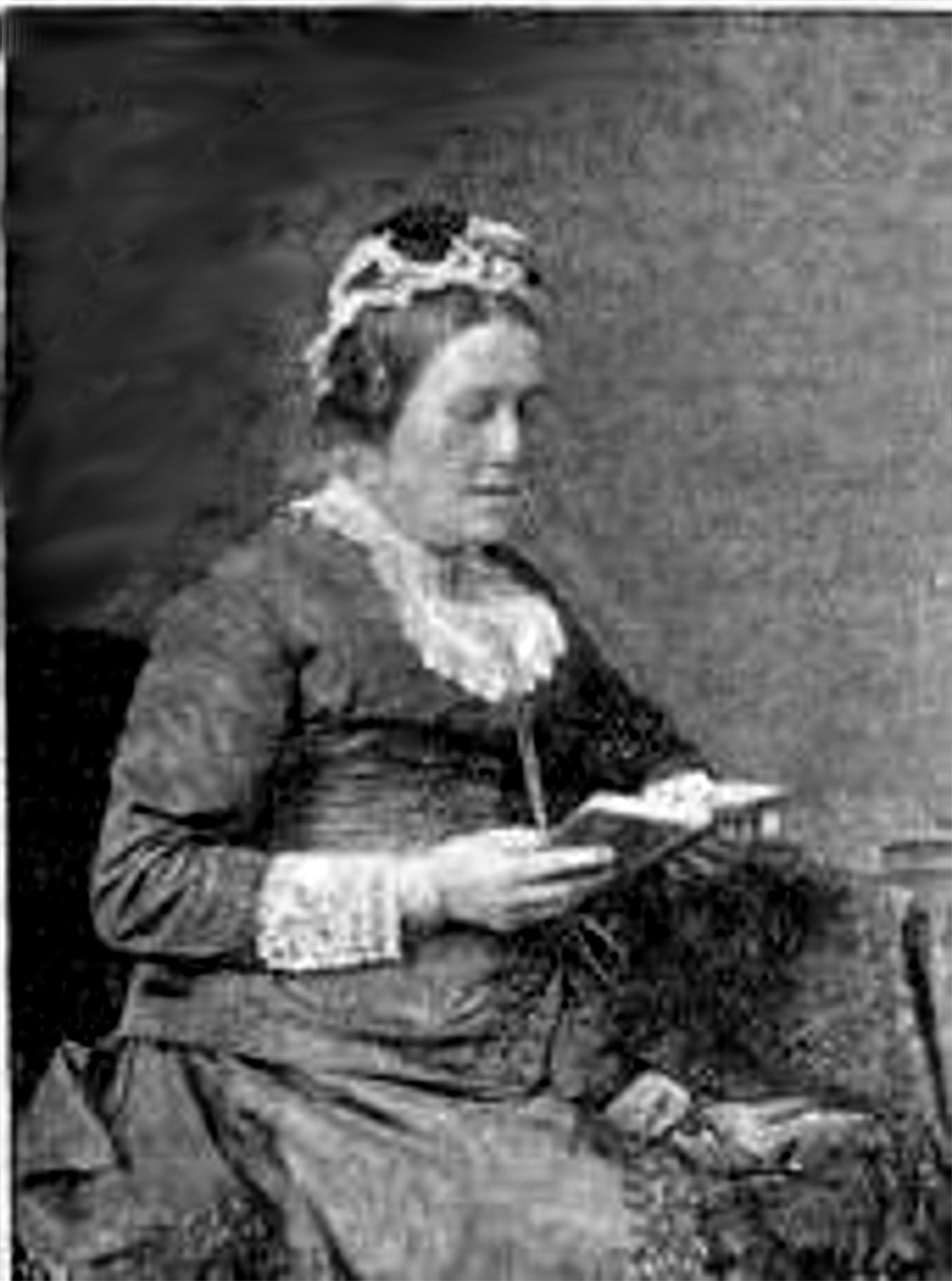
Elizabeth Stirling

Elizabeth Stirling - spousal name Elizabeth Bridge - (26 February 1819 – 25 March 1895) was an English organist and composer.

== Biography ==
Elizabeth Stirling was born in Greenwich, London, into an affluent family. She attended the Royal Academy of Music as a private student (women could not enroll.) There she studied piano and organ at with Edward Holmes and W. B. Wilson, and harmony with James Alexander Hamilton and Sir George Macfarren. In 1837 she performed a recital at St. Katherine's Church, Regent's Park, which was reviewed by The Musical World.

At the start of the century, young women were encouraged to play the piano as a social grace. By 1820, with London's rapid growth, most churches had organs, but skilled pianists were needed. The church became a place where women could earn a small income and still be respected working outside the home. Of the hundreds of female organists in England, Elizabeth Stirling’s name appeared frequently, but her activities were not unique. Ann Mounsey Bartholomew, Elizabeth Mounsey, Oliveria Prescott, Kate Loder, Kate Westrop, Elizabeth Chamberlayne, Eliza Wesley, Ann Stainer and many others were mentioned by name. They wrote organ voluntaries, interludes, choral anthems, and occasionally large works such as cantatas.

“England’s nineteenth-century female organists endeavored to do God’s business in a conservative patriarchal institution that sought to exclude them from prominent musical roles for reasons having less to do with religion than with social impropriety and a desire to keep women out of what was considered man’s professional sphere.”

When Elizabeth was 16 years old her father’s business failed, and she was suddenly forced to earn a living. She did so with her musical skills and became a respected recitalist, church organist, accompanist for a large community chorus, and successful composer of both organ and choral music. In 1839 Stirling took a position as organist at All Saints Church, Poplar, where she remained until 1858. In that year, she successfully competed for the post of organist at St Andrew Undershaft, a position she filled until 1880.

As an organist, Elizabeth Stirling was noted for her exceptional pedal playing. She published two grand voluntaries, six pedal fugues, eight slow movements and other organ-pieces, over fifty songs and duets, and arrangements of the works of Bach, Mozart and Handel. Her most popular song was "All Among the Barley".

In 1863, she married Frederick Albert Bridge ('F.A. Bridge'), photographer, choirmaster of St Martin-in-the-Fields and organist and choirmaster of St Martin, Ludgate. She died in 1895 at the age of 76. She is buried in the Ladywell Cemetery in south-east London.

=== Discrimination ===
In 1856 Stirling applied for a degree from Oxford University and submitted the required choral composition, only identified by her initials. Her Psalm 130, for five voices and orchestra, was approved, but when the examiners found out she was a woman, they refused the degree on account of her sex.

As England’s population grew, thousands of new churches were built. What ought to have been an expansion of employment was instead beset with discrimination. Some jobs were qualified with the phrase “ladies not eligible.” The organ loft was still considered a man’s domain, and churches found ways to discourage the incursion of women. In 1857, a clergyman asked, “why should a really competent female be set aside for the sake of a less competent male, simply because she is female?” In 1858, the Lady Organists’ Association was formed to bring ‘more prominently before the public the position and claims of ladies qualified for situations as parochial organists, who are too much in the habit of having their applications disregarded, and their qualifications deprecated, when applying for public appointments of this kind.’ One journalist from Punch suggested St. Cecilia herself could not get hired and should spare herself the anxiety and trouble of applying, even the previous organist was a woman. The spread the Oxford Movement caused the number of women organists to actually decline.

== Works ==
All Among the Barley

Selected works include:

=== Choral ===
- The Dream, SSTB, piano
- All Among The Barley, SATB
- The Forester, SATB, piano
- Back From the Brink, SATB, piano
- Sleeping, Why Now Sleeping, TTBB, piano

=== Organ ===
- Moderato and Maestoso
- Romantic Pieces for Organ
- Six Pedal Fugues for Organ On English Psalm Tunes
- Two Grand Voluntaries (Novello)
- Soft Voluntary
