= Shadwell station =

Shadwell station could refer to:

- Shadwell railway station, a station on the London Overground (formerly Shadwell tube station on the East London Line)
- Shadwell DLR station, a station on the Docklands Light Railway
- Shadwell and St George's East railway station, a closed station on the former London & Blackwall Railway
