= Shadwell DLR station =

Docklands Light Railway station

Shadwell
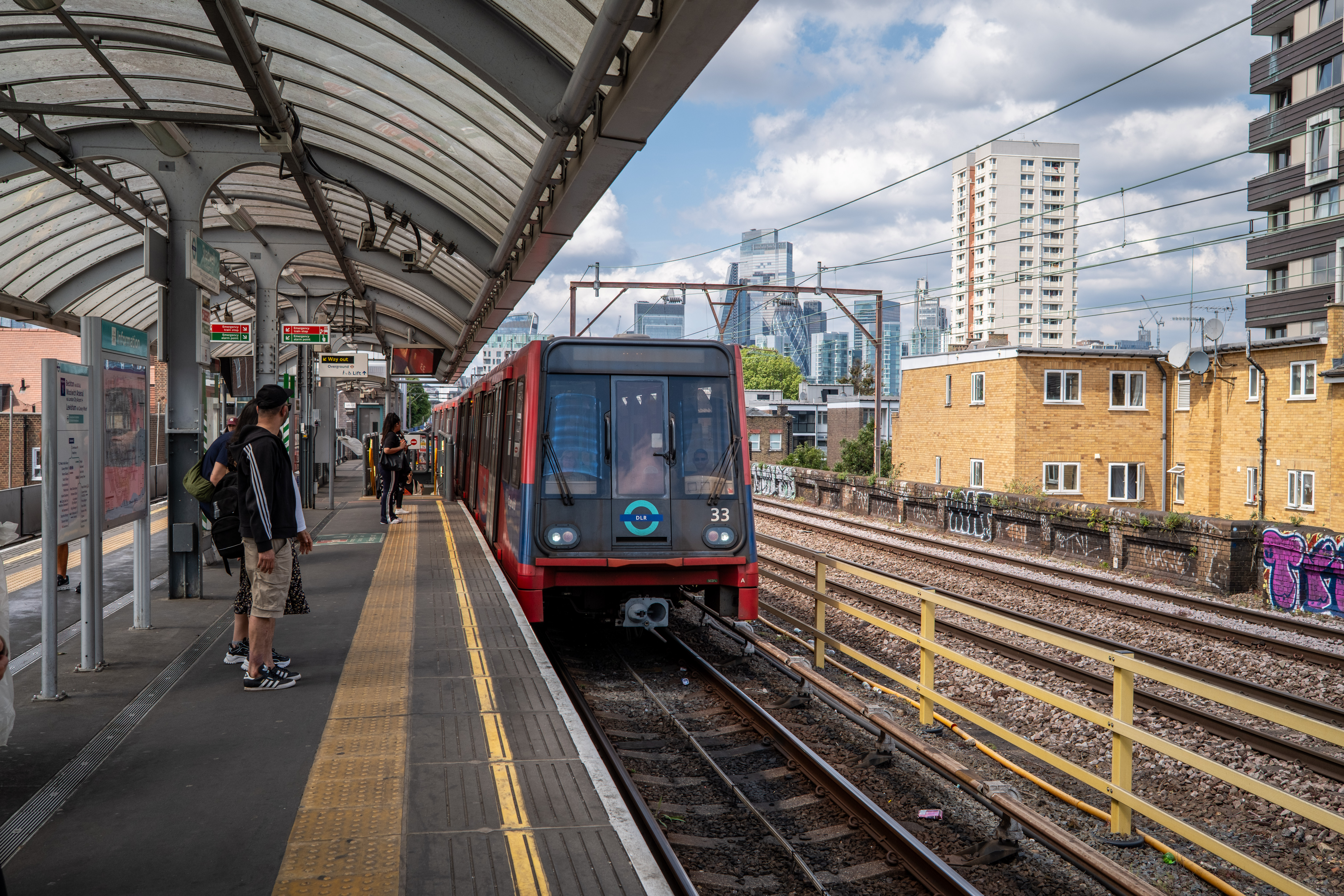
- Eastbound platform in 2025

General information
- Location: Shadwell, Tower Hamlets
- Coordinates: 51.511711°N 0.056214°W
- Owner: Transport for London
- Manager: Docklands Light Railway
- Platforms: 2
- Connections: Out-of-station interchanges: Shadwell

Construction
- Structure type: Elevated
- Accessible: Yes

Other information
- Status: Unstaffed
- Fare zone: 2
- Website: Official website

History
- Opened: 31 August 1987

Passengers

DLR annual entry and exit
- 2021: ▲4.668 million
- 2022: ▲5.050 million
- 2023: ▲6.360 million
- 2024: ▼5.77 million
- 2025: ▼5.39 million
Location
- Location in Tower Hamlets

Shadwell is a Docklands Light Railway (DLR) station in Shadwell in east London, England and is between the terminals of Bank and Tower Gateway to the west and Limehouse to the east. The 1991 Bank extension joins the main DLR line just to the west of Shadwell. It is located near Shadwell railway station for London Overground services, in London fare zone 2.

== History ==
This station opened on 31 August 1987 as part of the first tranche of DLR stations. It is located 50 yards to the west of an earlier station that was first called Shadwell and then renamed Shadwell & St. George's East, serving the slow lines of the London, Tilbury & Southend Railway that this section of the DLR replaced.

Initially designed for one-car DLR trains, Shadwell's platform was extended for two-car operation in 1991. The station was refurbished in 2009: the platforms were extended to accommodate three-car trains, the station entrance at ground level was altered, and an emergency exit was added at the east end of the platforms.

== Location ==
The station stands on a viaduct and consists of a single island platform serving trains in both directions. The ticket machines and entrance are at ground level to the west of the island platforms, facing onto Watney Street. The station is usually unstaffed, like most stations on the DLR. There is a crossover west of the station which allows trains from Westferry, Bank or Tower Gateway to reverse here.

Out-of-station interchanges with Shadwell railway station on the London Overground are permitted as part of a single journey.

London Buses routes 100, 339 and D3 serve the station.

== Services ==
The typical off-peak service in trains per hour from Shadwell is:

- 6 tph to Tower Gateway
- 18 tph to Bank
- 6 tph to Beckton
- 6 tph to Woolwich Arsenal
- 12 tph to Lewisham via Canary Wharf

Additional services call at the station during the peak hours, increasing the total service to up to 30 tph in each direction.

Preceding station	DLR	Following station
Tower Gateway Terminus	Docklands Light Railway	Limehouse towards Lewisham, Beckton or Woolwich Arsenal
Bank Terminus	Docklands Light Railway	Limehouse towards Lewisham, Beckton or Woolwich Arsenal
