= Ted Juniper =

English footballer

Personal information
- Full name: Edward Juniper
- Date of birth: 3 December 1901
- Place of birth: Shadwell, England
- Position: Forward

Senior career*
Years	Team	Apps	(Gls)
1920	Clapton Orient	9	(1)
- * Club domestic league appearances and goals

Edward Juniper (born 3 December 1901, date of death unknown) was a footballer who played in The Football League for Clapton Orient. He was born in Shadwell, England.
