= Rotherhithe railway station =

London Overground station

Rotherhithe
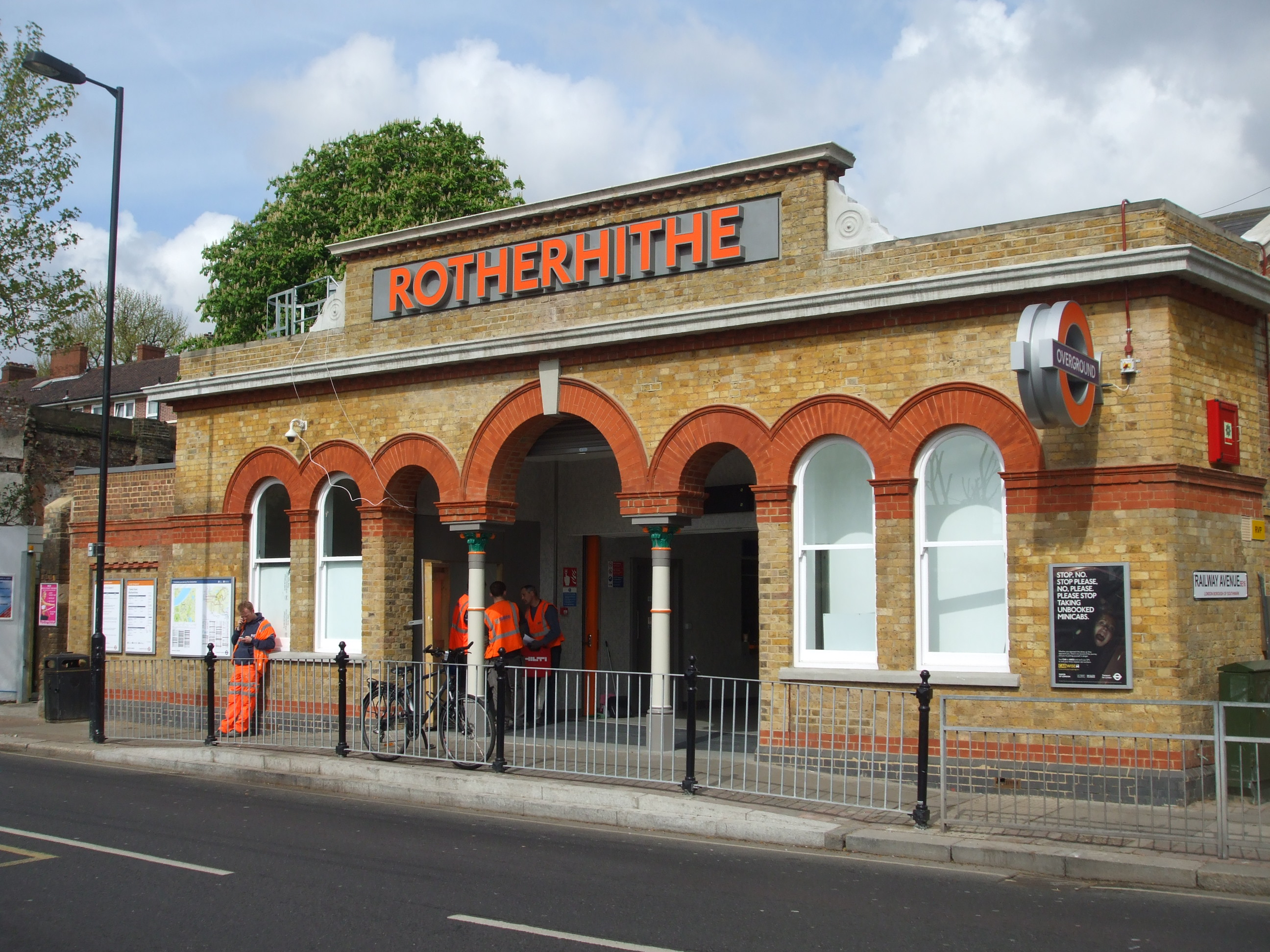
- The station building as an Overground railway station, April 2010
- Interactive map of Rotherhithe

General information
- Location: Rotherhithe
- Local authority: London Borough of Southwark
- Managed by: London Overground
- Owner: Transport for London
- Station code: ROE
- Number of platforms: 2
- Fare zone: 2

National Rail annual entry and exit
- 2020–21: ▼0.453 million
- 2021–22: ▲1.032 million
- 2022–23: ▲1.465 million
- 2023–24: ▲1.716 million
- 2024–25: ▲1.739 million

Key dates
- 7 December 1869: Opened
- 22 December 2007: Closed
- 27 April 2010: Reopened

Other information
- External links: Departures; Facilities
- Coordinates: 51.5008°N 0.0522°W

Rotherhithe is a railway station on the Windrush line of the London Overground network; it is located on the southern bank of the River Thames at Rotherhithe, within the London Borough of Southwark, England. It lies between Wapping and Canada Water stations, and is in London fare zone 2. Closed in late 2007 as a London Underground station on the East London line, it reopened on the London Overground for a preview service on 27 April 2010 to New Cross and New Cross Gate, and 23 May for the full service to West Croydon and Crystal Palace. On 9 December 2012, the line was extended to serve Clapham Junction via Peckham Rye.

== History ==
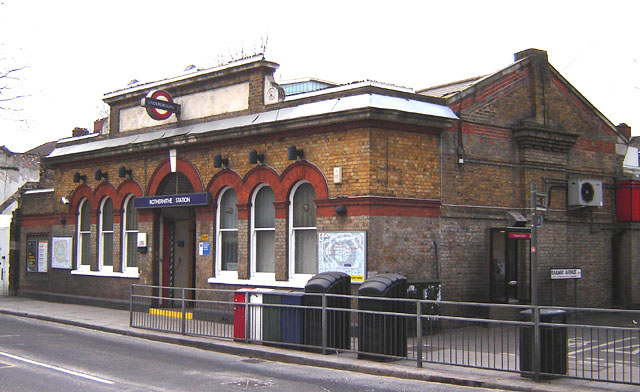
Rotherhithe station building, in Underground branding, February 2006

The station was originally opened on 7 December 1869, when the first section of the East London Railway was opened. On 1 October 1884, the Metropolitan and District Railways began running services along the East London Railway, which called at Rotherhithe. It was served by electric passenger trains from 31 March 1913, when the line was electrified. Goods trains from Liverpool Street station continued to pass through until April 1966.

The original station entrance was located in Albion Street, which meant that access to platforms was at the opposite end of the platforms from the present access.

Decorative vitreous enamel panels were added to the platforms. The station was then closed between 1995 and 1998 due to repair work on the Thames Tunnel and from 22 December 2007 to 27 April 2010 for the extension of the East London line (ELL).

The present surface building is located a short distance to the south of the original entrance shaft to the Thames Tunnel. It was extensively remodelled between March 1995 and March 1998, in conjunction with the renovation of the ELL. The building was heavily refurbished for the reopening of the ELL, with the entrance being enlarged by replacing two of the windows with arches.

=== London Overground ===
The station's future was in doubt for a while after the announcement of the East London line extension, as Rotherhithe's platforms can only take four-car trains and cannot be lengthened. Thus it was initially thought that Rotherhithe station might have to close when the line was extended; however, on 16 August 2004, the Mayor of London, Ken Livingstone, announced that the station would remain open.

== Layout ==
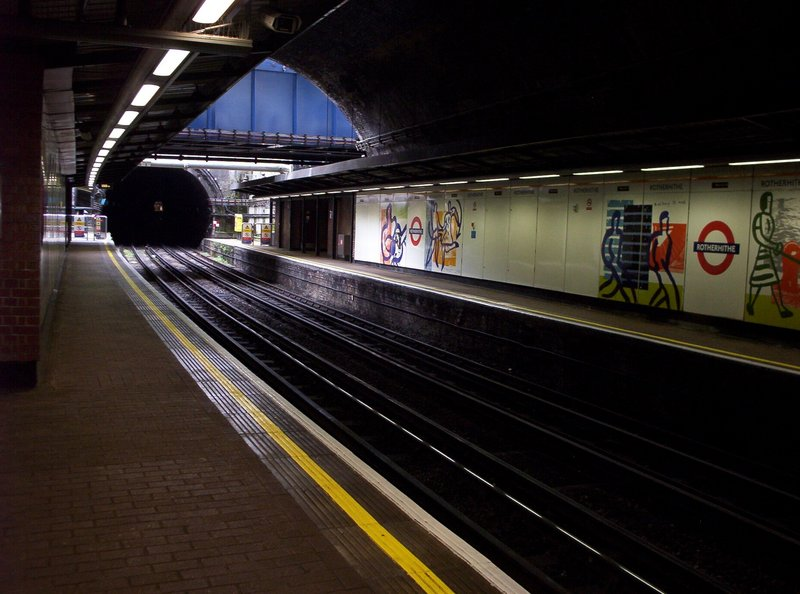
Platform view looking south, showing the low-angled Rotherhithe Tunnel approach ramp (painted blue) crossing over lines

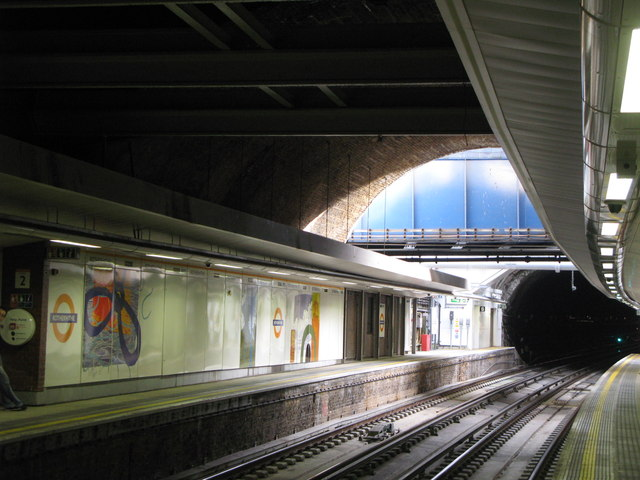
The same view a year after the line reopened as part of the London Overground

Rotherhithe station has two platforms (northbound and southbound) and is accessed by two escalators (one up, one down) and a flight of stairs to a landing, then stairs only to platform level.

There are ticket barriers in the ticket office controlling access to the platforms.

The station platforms are situated close to the southern end of the 1843 Thames Tunnel built by the Brunels, and some of the tunnel's original brickwork can be seen from the north end of the platforms. A better view of the Thames Tunnel portals can be seen from the platforms at Wapping on the opposite side of the river.

At the southern end of the station platforms, the approach ramp for the 1908 Rotherhithe Tunnel passes above the railway on a low and angled road bridge, which is highly unusual for being located below water level; the bridge structure is easily visible. The Rotherhithe Tunnel portal is also visible when looking up from the southern end of the northbound platform.

== Services ==
London Overground operates the following typical off-peak service in trains per hour (tph):

- 16 tph to Dalston Junction; of which:
  - 8 tph continue to Highbury & Islington
- 4 tph to West Croydon
- 4 tph to Crystal Palace
- 4 tph to New Cross
- 4 tph to Clapham Junction, via Peckham Rye (very limited weekdays-only service to/from Battersea Park).

| Preceding station | London Overground | Following station |
|---|---|---|
| Wapping towards Dalston Junction or Highbury & Islington | Windrush line East London line and South London line | Canada Water towards Clapham Junction, Crystal Palace, New Cross or West Croydon |
Former services
| Preceding station | London Underground | Following station |
| Wapping towards Hammersmith | Metropolitan line (1884–1906) | Deptford Road towards New Cross or New Cross Gate |
| Wapping towards Hammersmith | Metropolitan line (1913–1939) | Surrey Docks towards New Cross or New Cross Gate |
| Wapping towards Wimbledon, Richmond, Ealing Broadway or South Harrow | District line (1884–1905) | Deptford Road towards New Cross Gate |
| Wapping towards Whitechapel or Shoreditch | East London line (1913–1999) | Surrey Quays towards New Cross or New Cross Gate |
| Wapping towards Whitechapel or Shoreditch | East London line (1999–2006) | Canada Water towards New Cross or New Cross Gate |

== Onward connections ==
London Buses routes 381, C10 and night route N381 serve the station.
