= Bishop Challoner Catholic School =

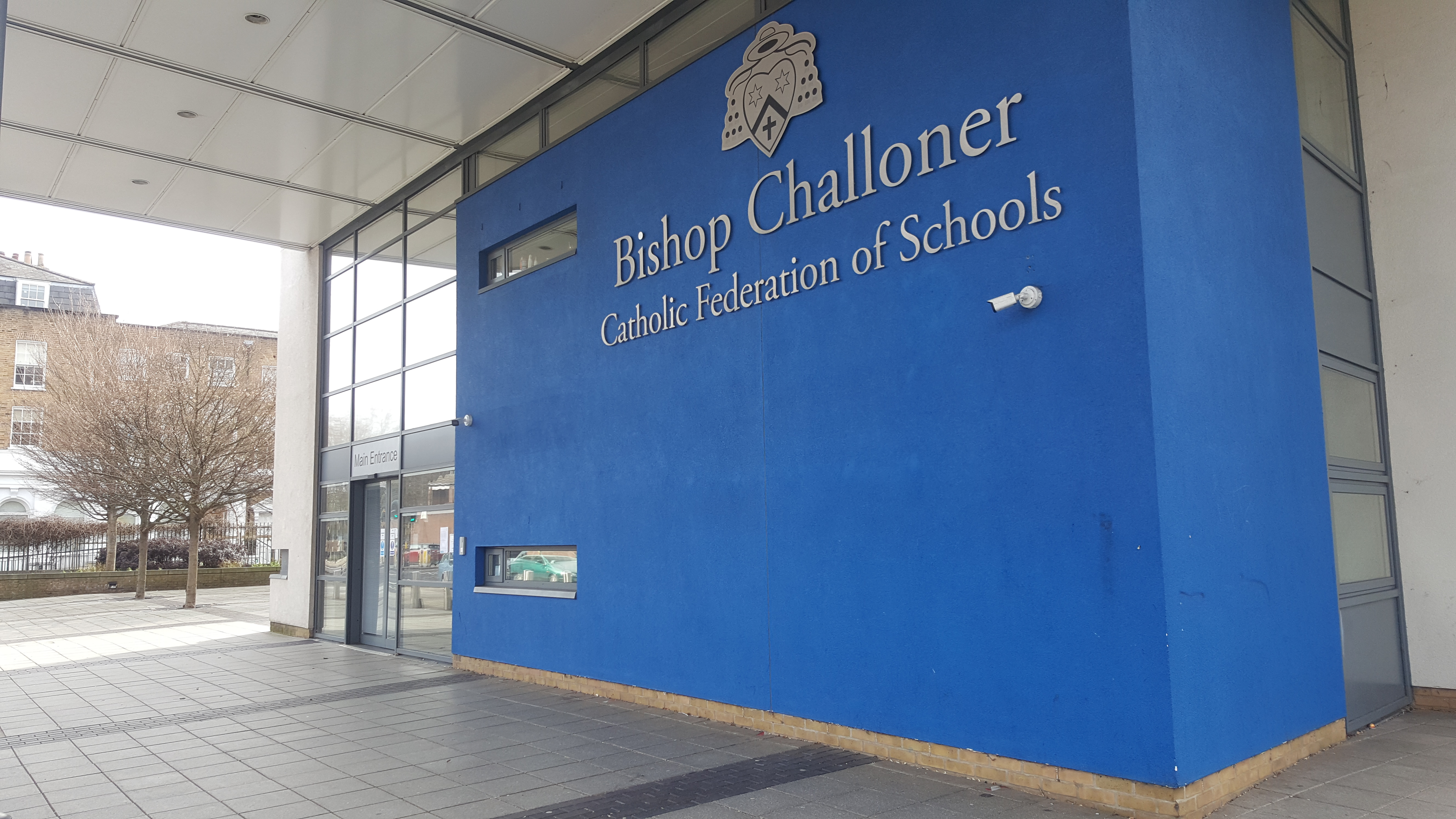
- Main entrance to school

Location
- 352 Commercial Road; Shadwell, London, E1 0LB; England; 51.51312°N 0.051465°W

Information
- Type: Voluntary aided school
- Religious affiliation: Roman Catholic
- Established: 1930
- Local authority: Tower Hamlets
- Department for Education URN: 100978 Tables
- Ofsted: Reports
- Executive Headteacher: JP Morrison
- Gender: Coeducational
- Age: 11 to 18
- Website: www.bishopchallonerfederation.towerhamlets.sch.uk

Bishop Challoner Catholic School is a Roman Catholic comprehensive secondary school and sixth form, located in the Shadwell area of the London Borough of Tower Hamlets, England.

The school is a voluntary aided co-educational school and sixth form. The school is administered by Tower Hamlets London Borough Council and the Roman Catholic Archdiocese of Westminster. Tower Hamlets Borough’s high levels of child poverty are evident in the high proportion of children entitled to free school meals which in 2011 stood at 57%.

== Admissions ==
In 2016, around 50% of the intake was Roman Catholic. Whilst the pupil profile at Bishop Challoner is diverse, Bangladeshi children are very significantly under-represented in comparison to Tower Hamlets as a whole; in 2008, 13% of new entrants were Asian, compared to the local authority profile of 62%. The school receives few applications from Bangladeshi parents. Nevertheless, in 1992, parents legally challenged the admission policy of the school; this was not successful.

== Architecture ==
The Learning Village project was a collaboration between the Department of Education, the Diocese of Westminster and Tower Hamlets Council. Building work began on the Learning Village in 2006.

The architects were Perkins Ogden. Sapa Building Systems wrote that, "The design brief for a building can be complex and influenced by many issues. Bishop Challoner Catholic Collegiate School presented us with the unique challenge of preserving the view of an historic church from the perspective of a modern school building... Bringing defining modern architecture to the London Borough of Tower Hamlets. Bishop Challenor School features an elevated section to meet this requirement and includes Dualframe 55 casement windows, Elegance 52 ST curtain walling and 202 entrance doors." Perkins Ogden wrote that "The inner city site is extremely constrained. The new building responds to this by bridging a public highway to access further available land. This zinc-clad elevated block forms an ‘inhabited bridge’ containing general teaching accommodation. Shared specialist facilities are arranged at the street level frontage, reinstating the historic urban grain using a traditional London Stock brick."

This project comprises new and upgraded accommodation for the newly-created federated school for 1,700 students, on the inner-city campus of an existing girls’ school. It includes boys' and girls' secondary schools, a sixth form centre for 16-18 aged students, and a community centre.

== History ==
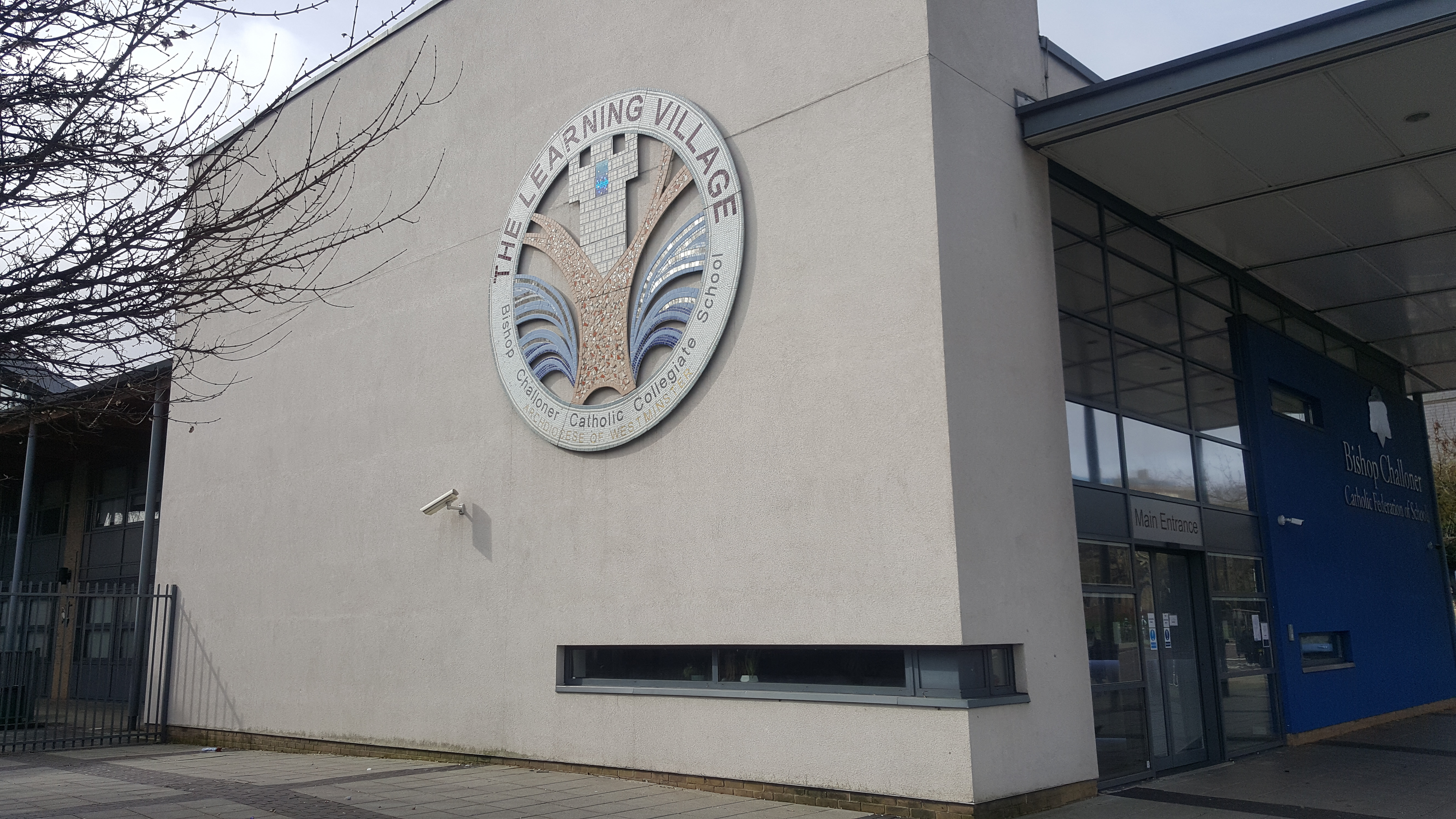
Wall plaque referencing 'The Learning Village'

The school was established in 1930 by the Roman Catholic Diocese of Westminster and the Sisters of Mercy.

The federation was established in September 2001, as a result of the decision to close the nearby Blessed John Roche Boys’ School and open a new boys’ school under the governance, leadership and management of the Bishop Challoner Girls' School. The concept was that of a joint or federated school with boys and girls taught in separate buildings from 11 to 16 years, but sharing some specialist facilities and most teaching staff. The Collegiate School also included a mixed 6th form and would eventually have an overall complement of 1,700 pupils. The Collegiate and Learning Village names remained in use until May 2014 and the schools were known as Bishop Challoner Catholic Collegiate School. In May 2015, the name formally changed to Bishop Challoner Catholic Federation of Schools.

A project allocation of £30.1m was approved by the DfES for an extended campus based on the concept of a "learning village", to be developed on a phased basis whilst maintaining existing facilities in use.The learning village was planned to provide a combined campus for the education of boys and girls from ages 3 to 18 by integrating the establishments already on the site:

- The Catholic Primary School, the Boys’ and Girls’ Schools, the current joint Sixth Form
- The local parish church
- The Learning Village

The "learning village" was to be a partnership between the Collegiate School, the Church and the local community to provide educational, cultural and recreational resources for the local community.

In September 2023 the schools formally merged to become co-educational. The school name was then changed to Bishop Challoner Catholic School.

== The patron of the school ==
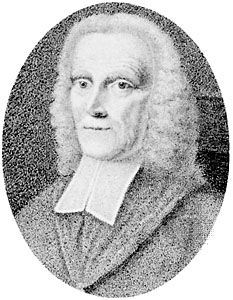
Richard Challoner, engraving, British Museum

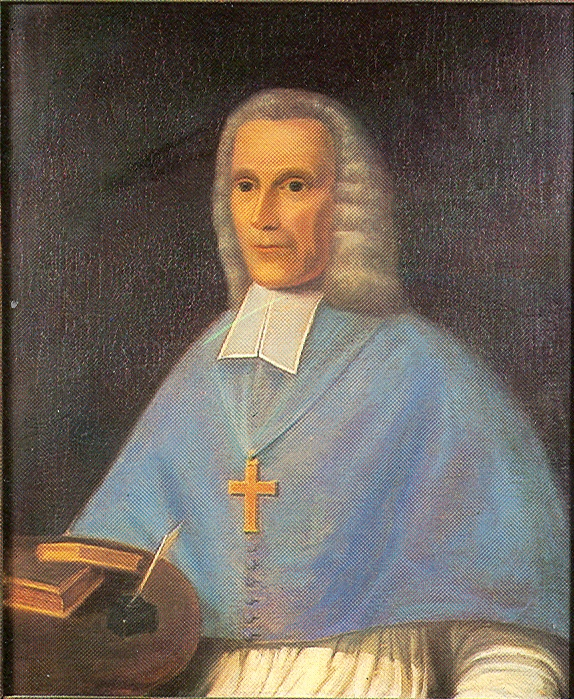
Richard Challoner, engraving

The school is named after Bishop Richard Challoner (born 29 September 1691, Lewes, Sussex, - died 12 January 1781, London), a leading figure of English Catholicism during the greater part of the 18th century.

On 22 January 2010, at the official opening of the Federation, Bishop Stack, Chairman of the Diocese of Westminster’s Education Commission spoke "these profound words to those gathered on the site of steel, zinc and walls of glass":

"In 1946 the remains of Bishop Richard Challoner were transferred from their burial place in Milton, Berkshire, to a new tomb in Westminster Cathedral. It was fitting that his body should be brought back to Central London where he had been a bishop for 40 years…"

== Curriculum ==
Bishop Challoner Catholic Collegiate School offers GCSEs and BTECs as programmes of study for pupils, while students in the sixth form have the option to study a range of A Levels and further BTECs.

== Headteachers and executive principals ==
The Collegiate "Learning Village" project was the idea of Catherine Myers, the headteacher of Bishop Challoner from 1992 to 2010 when she retired. Born in Glasgow in 1945, Mrs Myers "transformed [the school] beyond all recognition... as its first lay head after an era of nuns". Myers made many changes to the systems and leadership, but "besides these structural revolutions, however, her greatest challenge [was] to oversee a complete reversal in the school's culture." By 2001, "the nearby Catholic boys' school Blessed John Roach had failed its Ofsted inspection and was closed down and Mrs Myers pushed through the idea with the Diocese to transform Bishop Challoner into the country's first federated school - a girls' school, a boys' school and a sixth-form college, all run separately, but under the control of one executive head."

The Catholic publication The Tablet wrote in 2010, "You could call Catherine Myers a mutation in evolutionary terms. When in 2001 Bishop Challoner Catholic Collegiate School in east London was appointed the country’s first federated school, she became the first of a new species of executive head teacher." In 2009, she was shortlisted for the 2009 Secondary School Head of the Year at the UK Teaching Awards.

In early February 2010, Myers was appointed to the Papal Order of St Gregory the Great, becoming a Dame of St Gregory (DSG). In 2008, she was awarded a national honour (Order of Merits to Lithuania: ‘UZ Nuopelnus Lietuvai’) by the Lithuanian Government for her "services to education for the Lithuanian community."

Period	Name
1957 - 1995	Sister Mary Berchman
1992 - 2010	Catherine Mayers, OBE
2010 - 2015	Jackie Johnson
2015 – 2016	Nick Soar (interim)
2016 – 2017	Niamh Arnull
2017 – 2021	Richard Fitzgerald
2021 – 2024	Mr JP Morrison
2024-	Adam Hall
