= Frederick Albert Bridge =

English photographer, organist, singer and choirmaster (1841–1917)

Frederick Albert Bridge or F. A. Bridge (18 December 1841 – 29 December 1917) was an English photographer, organist, singer and choirmaster.

== Biography ==
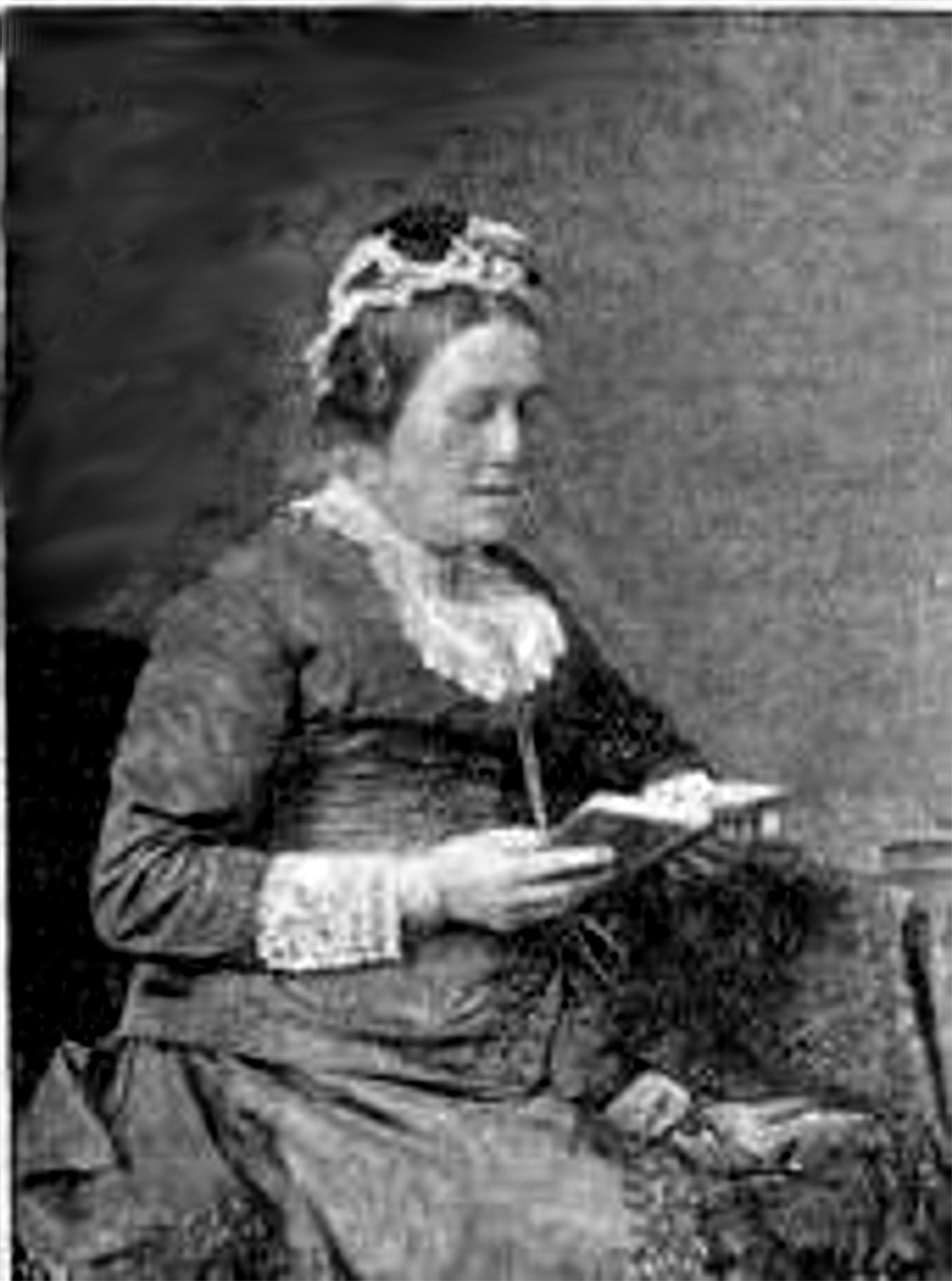
Photograph of Elizabeth Stirling by her husband F.A. Bridge

Bridge was born in Shadwell. He maintained a professional photographer's studio at Dalston Lane, Hackney, and was a member of the Photographic Club. He served as treasurer of the South London Photographic Society in 1877 and as secretary of the London & Provincial Photographic Association in 1888. He completed a series of photographs of tunneling on the Central London Railway in 1897. In 1874 he gave a series of lectures entitled "Gems of English Scenery and Song", accompanied by magic lantern slides. He also wrote articles on photography which were published in professional journals.

Besides his photography career, Bridge was successful as a conductor and singer. He worked for many years as choirmaster of St Martin-in-the-Fields. He also served as organist and choirmaster of St Martin, Ludgate, and conducted the St. John's Choral Society. From 1872, Bridge worked in London theater, performing principal roles in operettas by Offenbach and Gilbert and Sullivan.

Bridge married organist and composer Elizabeth Stirling (1818–1895) on 16 May 1863 in Stepney. After she died, he married Eliza Mary Perfect Harding (1845–1910) on 2 April 1896, who served as his photographic assistant. Bridge died in Bognor after a fall while on holiday and was buried in Abney Park Cemetery.
