= Shadwell =

District of East London, England

Coordinates: 51.509444°N 0.0525°W

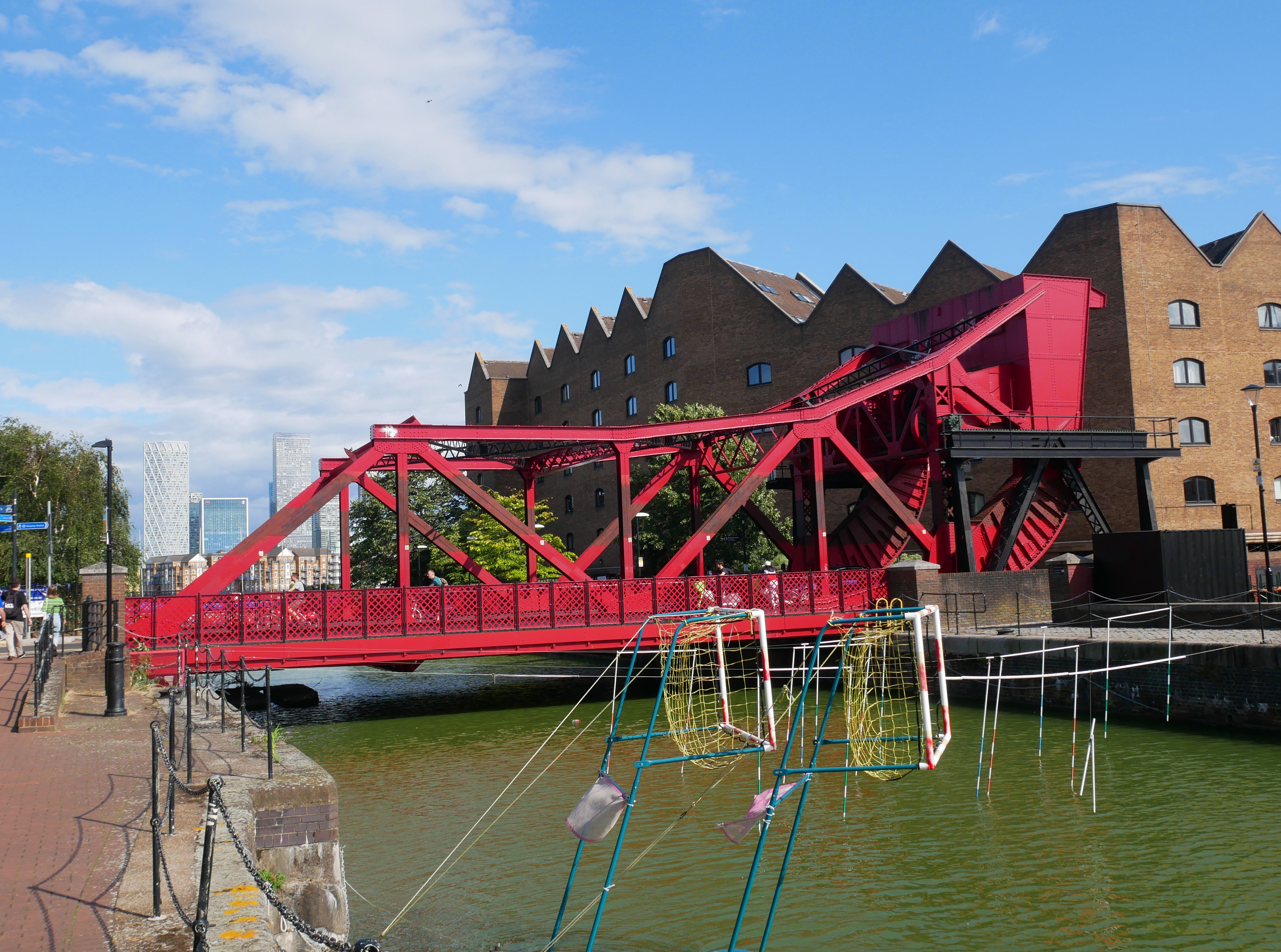
- Shadwell Basin Bridge

- Location within Greater London
- Population: 15,110 (2011 Census. Ward)
- OS grid reference: TQ351807
- London borough: Tower Hamlets
- Ceremonial county: Greater London
- Region: London
- Country: England
- Sovereign state: United Kingdom
- Post town: LONDON
- Postcode district: E1, E1W
- Dialling code: 020
- Police: Metropolitan
- Fire: London
- Ambulance: London
- UK Parliament: Poplar and Limehouse
- London Assembly: City and East

Shadwell is an area in the London Borough of Tower Hamlets in East London, England. It also forms part of the city's East End. Shadwell is on the north bank of the River Thames between Wapping (to the west) and Ratcliff and Limehouse (to the east) and is 3 miles (4.8 km) east of Charing Cross. This riverside location has meant the area's history and character have been shaped by the maritime trades.

Historically a hamlet of the Manor and Ancient Parish of Stepney, it became a parish in its own right in 1670. the area of the Hamlet and Parish included areas south of Cable Street including Shadwell Basin and the King Edward Memorial Park.

== History ==
=== Etymology ===
In the 13th century, the area was a low lying marsh known as Scadflet, from the Anglo-Saxon fleot, meaning a shallow creek or bay. Because a spring by a church dedicated to St Chad filled a nearby well, a false etymology changed the name into Chadwelle. This changed further into Shadwell.

=== Roman period ===
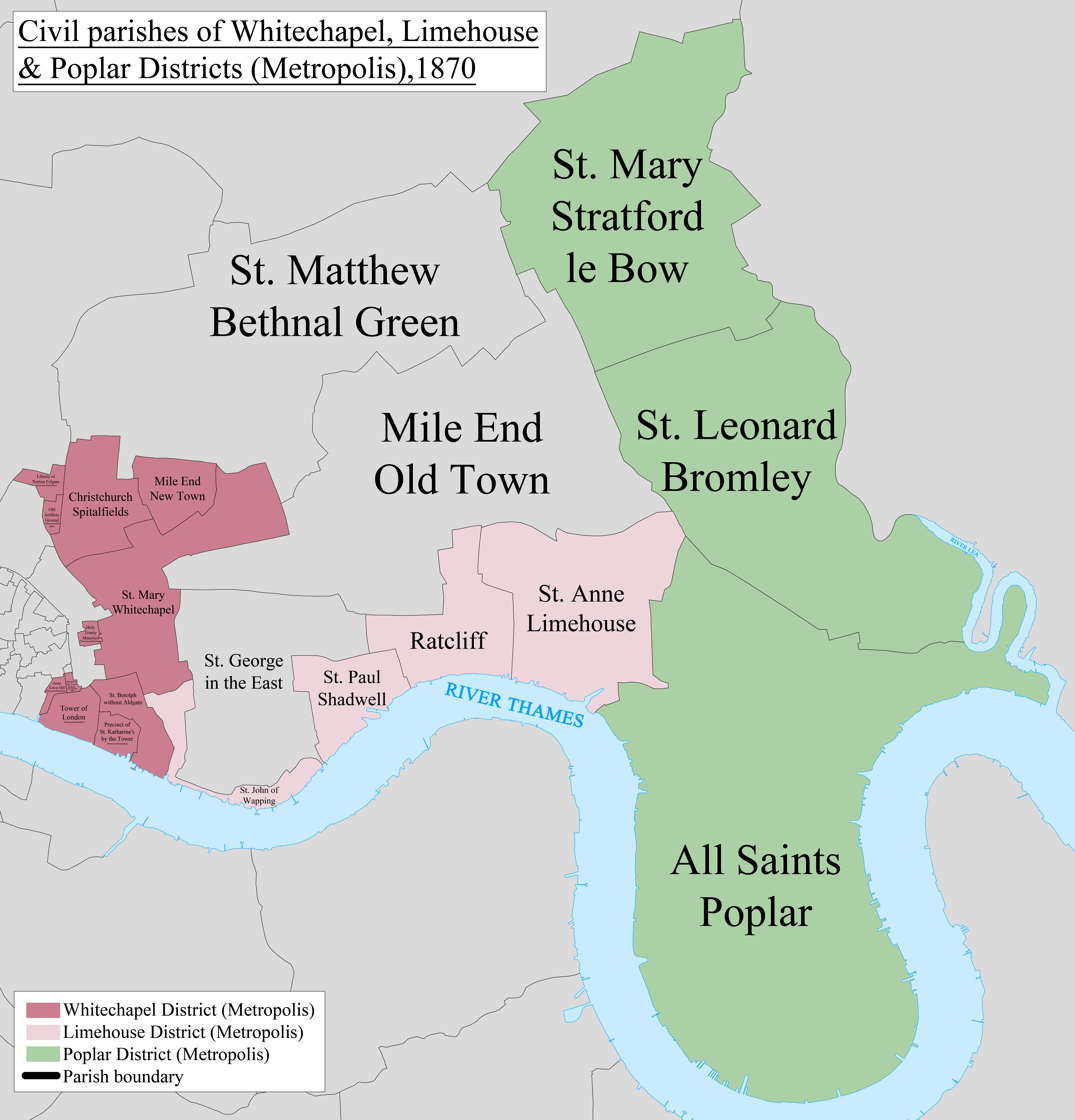
The daughter-parishes of Stepney that would evolve into the modern London Borough of Tower Hamlets

The Shadwell ward of the Metropolitan Borough of Stepney, 1916. The ward occupied the same area as the former Hamlet and Parish of Shadwell.

In 1975, archaeologists discovered evidence of a port complex between Ratcliff and Shadwell, that was used throughout Roman occupation of Britain, and being most active in the 3rd century AD. The port seems to have initially been used for seagoing ships into the City of London, which is believed to have stopped between 250 and 270AD. A water level drop meant that the port was used primarily for the public bath house near St George in the East, which existed from the first to fourth centuries.

In 2019, remains of a Roman Bath House was located in Wapping Lane, on the northeast corner of Sovereign Close. Archaeologists have also found evidence of a late third-century signal tower in Shadwell. A Roman cemetery containing two coffins was also discovered in Shadwell in around 1615.

=== Administrative history ===
The area was part of the historic (or ancient) county of Middlesex, but military and most (or all) civil county functions were managed more locally, by the Tower Division (also known as the Tower Hamlets).

The role of the Tower Division ended when Shadwell became part of the new County of London in 1889. On 1 April 1921 the civil parish was abolished and merged with Limehouse. At the 1911 census (one of the last before the abolition of the parish), Shadwell had a population of 7838. The County of London was replaced by Greater London in 1965.

=== 16th and 17th centuries ===
Shadwell's eastern waterfront had been drained in the Middle Ages whilst the western waterfront had been drained during the reign of King Henry VIII, by Cornelius Vanderdelf after an act of Parliament. This had been caused by an increase in London's maritime activities in the 16th century.

The riverside areas of East London experienced rapid, low quality development, that reached Shadwell in the late 16th century. Writing in 1598, John Stow describes the poverty of the riverside development that took place then, with its:

continual street or filthy strait passage with alleys of small tenements or cottages built…almost to Ratcliffe

— John Stow, Survey of London, 1598,

John Stow also recalls elm trees being felled in order to make way for tenements. Away from the river the area remained largely undeveloped. In 1650, Shadwell had 703 buildings. Of the houses, 195 were single-storey houses, 473 were two-storey houses, and 33 were three-storey houses, although many were subdivided. The population of Shadwell in 1650 was around 3,500. In the 1660s, a hearth tax was introduced, although around 50% of residents in Shadwell were deemed too poor to pay the tax.

In 1669, Thomas Neale became a local landowner, buying some land reclaimed from the river, and gained Shadwell parish status. In addition, Neale built 289 homes, a mill, and a market, and also established a waterworks on large ponds left by the draining of the marsh. The area had been largely undeveloped and he developed the waterfront, with houses behind as a speculation, and in doing so provided fresh water for Shadwell and Wapping. Shadwell's maritime industries were further developed with roperies, tanneries, breweries, wharves, smiths, and numerous taverns, as well as the chapel of St Paul's. Seventy-five sea captains are buried in its churchyard; Captain James Cook had his son baptised there. Shadwell's new houses were built in an orderly fashion, so that the streets ran between Ratcliff Highway and Wapping Wall. In 1674, Shadwell had a population of around 8,000. The prosperity in this period has been linked to the road connections into London, which were maintained by wealthy taxpayers from Middlesex, Essex, Kent and Surrey.

=== 18th and 19th centuries ===
A database of UK newspaper adverts, seeking the capture and return of enslaved runaways, known today as Freedom Seekers has identified sisters living and working in Shadwell in the mid-1700s.

Jane Gray and her younger sister, Maria, were born in Antigua in 1739 and 1742. They were the enslaved domestic servants of Captain James Barrett and his family. In 1758, when they were 19 and 16 years old, parish records confirm that the Barrett family lived in Musick House Court, just opposite St Paul's Church, Shadwell.

It is not clear how they entered Captain Barrett's service but the surname, Gray, suggests a connection with the Gray family and their plantations in Antigua. John Gray Senior, owned Turnbulls and Gray's Belfast amongst other property on the island, and he may have named the sisters after two of his daughters, who were also called Jane and Maria.

The sisters arranged their own baptisms, on different days, in July 1758. Not at St Pauls, in the parish they lived, but at St Margaret's, Westminster. It is possible that they intended to establish themselves in a different parish, and did not want the Barretts to know. Four months later, the sisters ran away.

By the mid-eighteenth century, Shadwell Spa was established, producing sulphurous waters, in Sun Tavern fields. As well as being used for medicinal purposes, salts were extracted from the waters and used by local calicoprinters to fix their dyes. By the mid-eighteenth century, many houses in Shadwell had been rebuilt. "Seamen, watermen and lightermen, coalheavers and shopkeepers, and ropemakers, coopers, carpenters and smiths, lived in small lathe and plaster or weatherboard houses, two storeys and a garret high, with one room on each floor"; the average rent was £2/7/0. In 1768, London coal workers who were protesting for higher wages began shooting at the landlord of the Roundabout Tavern in Shadwell; as a result, seven of them were hanged in the Sun Tavern fields. Their execution was witnessed by around 50,000 spectators, the largest crowd at a hanging since the hanging of Laurence Shirley, 4th Earl Ferrers in 1760. in 1794, many houses on the Ratcliffe Highway were destroyed by a fire which "consumed more houses than any one conflagration has done since the Great Fire of London", and also destroyed many boats, and around £40,000 of sugar.

Shadwell Waterworks was sold in 1801 to the London Dock Company; the waterworks were the first ones in London to use a Watt steam engine in 1788. The waterworks were later sold to the East London Waterwork Company for £300,000 in 1808, after an Act of Parliament allowed the company to obtain a compulsory purchase order. The modern area is dominated by the enclosed former dock, Shadwell Basin, whose construction destroyed much of the earlier settlement – by this time degenerated into slums. The basin once formed the eastern entrance to the then London Docks, with a channel leading west to St Katharine Docks. It is actually two dock basins – the south basin was constructed in 1828–32 and the north basin in 1854–8. A new entrance to Shadwell dock was opened in 1832, giving Shadwell access to the River Thames. Between 1854 and 1858, a 45 feet wide new entrance to the docks was constructed to allow larger ships into the dock. Shadwell Basin was one of three locked basins connecting the docks to the River Thames, and is the only one of the three still in existence today. In 1865, HMS Amazon docked at Shadwell Basin in order to pick up around 800 Mormons who were emigrating to America, and in 1869, the Blue Jacket clipper, then the fastest clipper in the world, began her journey to Canterbury, New Zealand in Shadwell Basin. In 1865 during excavation for the creations of some docks at Shadwell, four nearby houses were flooded. In 1844, Shadwell was recorded as having had a population of 10,060, and having ten almshouses built using money from James Cook. Watney Market developed into a busy shopping area around this time.

In the 19th century, Shadwell was home to a large community of foreign South Asian lascar seamen, working on the sea-lanes to British India. There were also Anglo-Indians, from intermarriage and cohabitation between lascar seamen and local girls. There were also smaller communities of Chinese and Greek seamen, who also intermarried and cohabited with locals. In 1805, lascars caused disturbances in the streets of Shadwell which ended with 15 people being hospitalised, and 19 people being arrested.

During Victorian times, Shadwell and the East End were not seen as pleasant places. The growth of Shadwell's port led to an increase in the number of prostitutes in the area, and the area was known as the centre of the capital's opium smoking, and in 1861, Shadwell paid a poor rate of 3 s. 9d. An 1889 book The Bitter Cry of Outcast London described Ratcliffe, Shadwell and Bermondsey as a "revolting spectacle", a "dark vision", and a "ghastly reality", whilst Charles Dickens' unfinished novel The Mystery of Edwin Drood involves a journey to an opium den in Shadwell, which includes the line "Eastward and still eastward through the stale streets he takes his way, until he reaches his destination: a miserable court, specially miserable amongst many such."

In 1885, Shadwell Fish Market was opened as an alternative to Billingsgate Fish Market. Although Shadwell had the advantage of three times the river frontage of Billingsgate and access via train, (Note: Shadwell & St. George's East railway station had opened in 1840, and Shadwell railway station in 1876.) the fish market was ultimately unsuccessful. In 1901, it was sold to the City of London Corporation, and was eventually closed in 1914. The site later became King Edward Memorial Park in 1922, when it was opened by King George V, and was Shadwell's first park. From 1868 to 1932, Shadwell was home to the East London Hospital for Children (later the Queen Elizabeth Hospital for Children), before it moved to Wapping, and was later closed down in 1963.

=== 20th century ===
In 1906, the Corporation of London agreed to contribute £500 to the widening of Shadwell High Street to 40 feet (12 m). In 1916, seven women were killed in a sack factory fire; around 50 women were in the building at the time, and the rest escaped. The five-storey warehouse was almost completely destroyed. In 1934, a 10 lb (4.5 kg) bomb was found four feet below the surface of Shadwell High Street; the bomb was believed to be from the German World War I air raids on the area.

In 1936 residents of Shadwell were heavily involved in the Battle of Cable Street which took place nearby, when Oswald Mosley's fascists attempted to march through the East End, in order to intimidate the area's large Jewish population. The police ordered Mosley to abandon his march when 250,000 or more protestors blocked his way, and police attempts to clear a way for him were unsuccessful. Workers in Shadwell continued to oppose the British Union of Fascists, and in 1937, Shadwell dockers threatened an unofficial strike after local casual dock labourer Cecil Anthony Hiron was nominated as a BUF candidate in the Stepney Council elections in November; Hiron later withdrew his nomination.

In 1969, the Shadwell Docks, along with the other London docks, closed and were purchased by Tower Hamlets Council. During the 1970s, the docks became derelict, before being bought by the London Docklands Development Corporation, who built 169 houses and flats by the basin in 1987.

The Watney Market area was demolished and rebuilt during the 1970s and 1980s.

In 1987, Shadwell DLR station was opened, which connected Shadwell to Tower Gateway near Fenchurch Street, and later also Bank station from 1991.

== Parish church ==
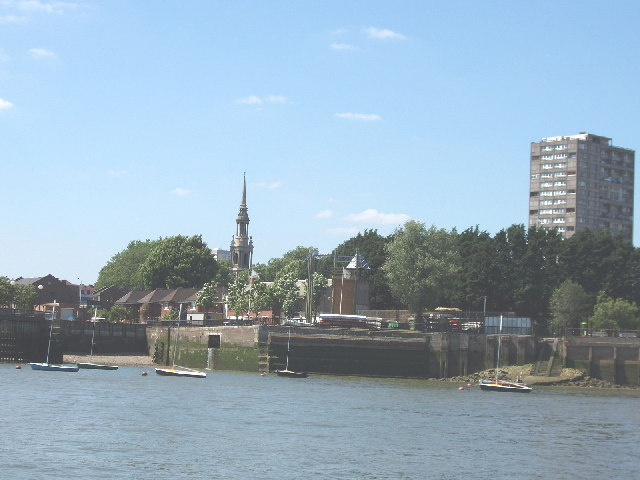
St Paul's Church can be clearly seen from the Thames.

St. Paul's Shadwell with St. James Ratcliffe, is traditionally known as the Church of Sea Captains. In 1656 the church was established as a Chapel of Ease, from St Dunstan's, at Stepney. In 1669, it was rebuilt as the Parish Church of Shadwell, and it was the last of five parish churches rebuilt after the Restoration. In 1820, it was again rebuilt as a 'Waterloo church'. Captain James Cook was an active parishioner and John Wesley preached in the church from time to time. Isham Randolph of Dungeness, one of Thomas Jefferson's grandfathers and son of William Randolph, was married in St. Paul's church.

== Electoral wards ==
The northern part of Shadwell, along with large parts of neighbouring areas, is included in the Shadwell electoral ward. Since boundary changes in 2018, the ward no longer includes any of riverside Shadwell.

Southern Shadwell is included in the St Katharine's and Wapping electoral ward.

== Demographics ==
According to the 2011 census, 15,110 people lived in Shadwell.

Residents of Bangladeshi origin accounted for 52% of Shadwell's population in the 2011 census, with White British people comprising 20% of the ward. The next largest ethnic group was Other White at 9%. 52.9% of people were born in the United Kingdom, with the next highest being 20.8% of people being born in Bangladesh.

The most common religion in Shadwell is Islam, with 54.8% of people identifying as Muslim, the next highest being 20.6% who identified as Christian.

== Notable current and former residents ==
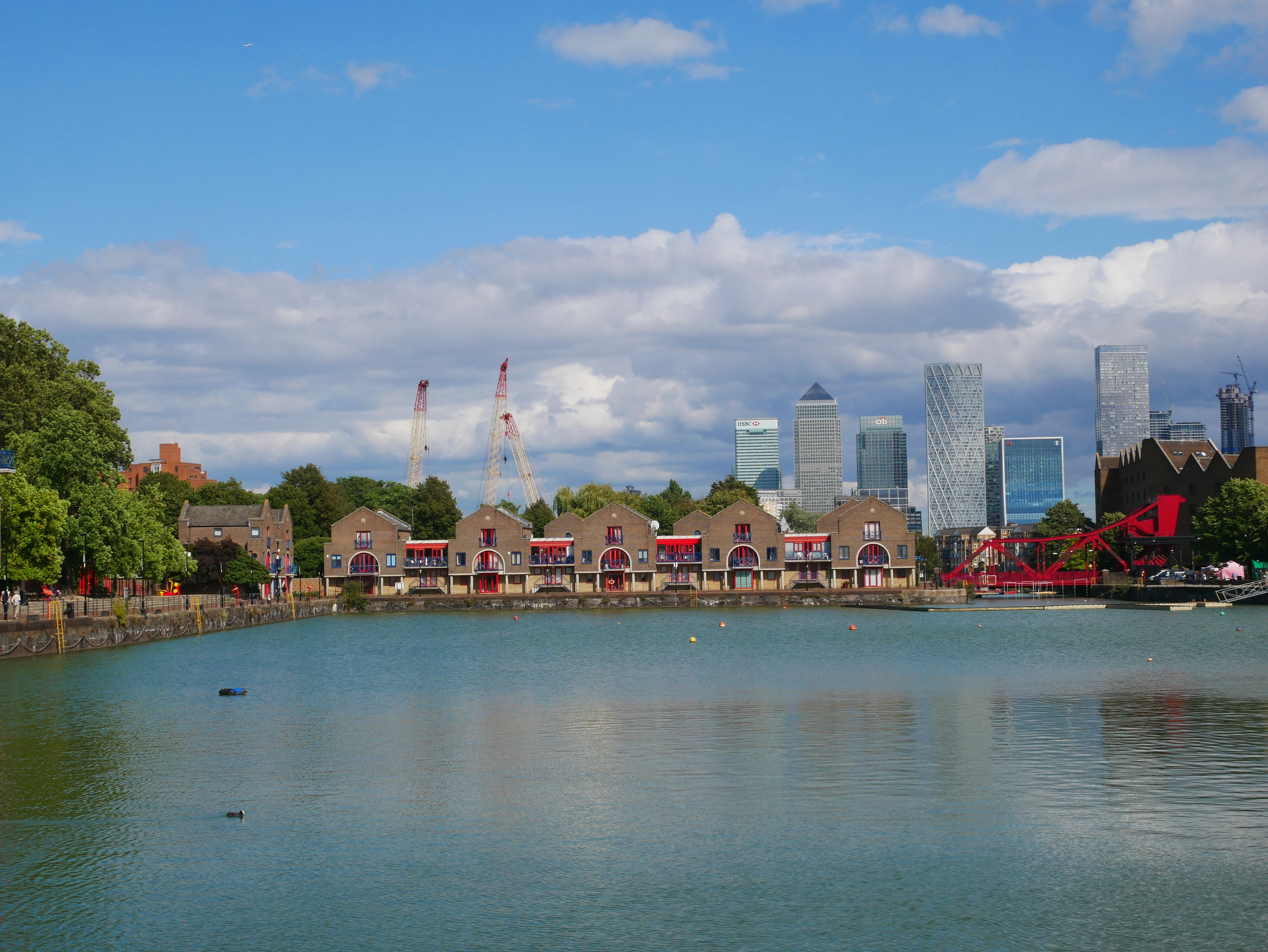
East-facing view across the Shadwell Basin (2023)

- Jane Randolph Jefferson (born 9 February 1720) – Mother of Thomas Jefferson
- Eliza Roberts (1802–1878), Head Nurse under Florence Nightingale during the Crimean War, born in Shadwell
- Sir William Henry Perkin (12 March 1838 – 14 July 1907) – born in Shadwell and at the age of 18 discovered the first aniline dye while doing experiments at his home in Cable Street.
- Walter Pater (4 August 1839 – 30 July 1894) – essayist and critic
- Frederick Albert Bridge (18 December 1841 – 29 December 1917) – photographer, singer, conductor and choirmaster
- Ted Juniper (born 3 December 1901, date of death unknown) – footballer
- Mildred Gordon (24 August 1923 – 8 April 2016) – Member of Parliament for Bow & Poplar (1987–1997) and teacher at Shadwell's Nicholas Gibson School, born and lived there until 1962
- Norman Giller (18 April 1940 -) – sports historian and prolific author, born and lived there until 1960
- Bob Crow (13 June 1961 – 11 March 2014) – trade union leader
- Jah Wobble, lived there from the early 1980s to mid-1990s – musician and writer

== Education ==
Specifically local schools include Blue Gate Fields and Bigland Green Primary school; and Bishop Challoner Catholic School. Also, Mulberry School For Girls

== Transport ==
=== Railway ===
Shadwell railway station is located just north of Cable Street, the area's historic northern boundary with the St. George in the East area of Wapping. It is situated on the London Overground's Windrush line and is in London fare zone 2. There are regular direct services to Dalston Junction, Highbury & Islington, West Croydon, Crystal Palace, New Cross and Clapham Junction.

Shadwell DLR station lies 50 metres to the north of the railway station and re-uses the former Shadwell & St. George's East railway station; this took its name from its location on the boundary of the two areas and closed in 1941. Services operate regularly between Bank and Lewisham.

=== Buses ===
London bus services in the area are operated primarily by Blue Triangle, London Central and Stagecoach London. Routes include the 15, 100, 108, 115, 135, D3 and night bus N15; these connect Shadwell with East and Central London.

== THCH Hop Festival ==
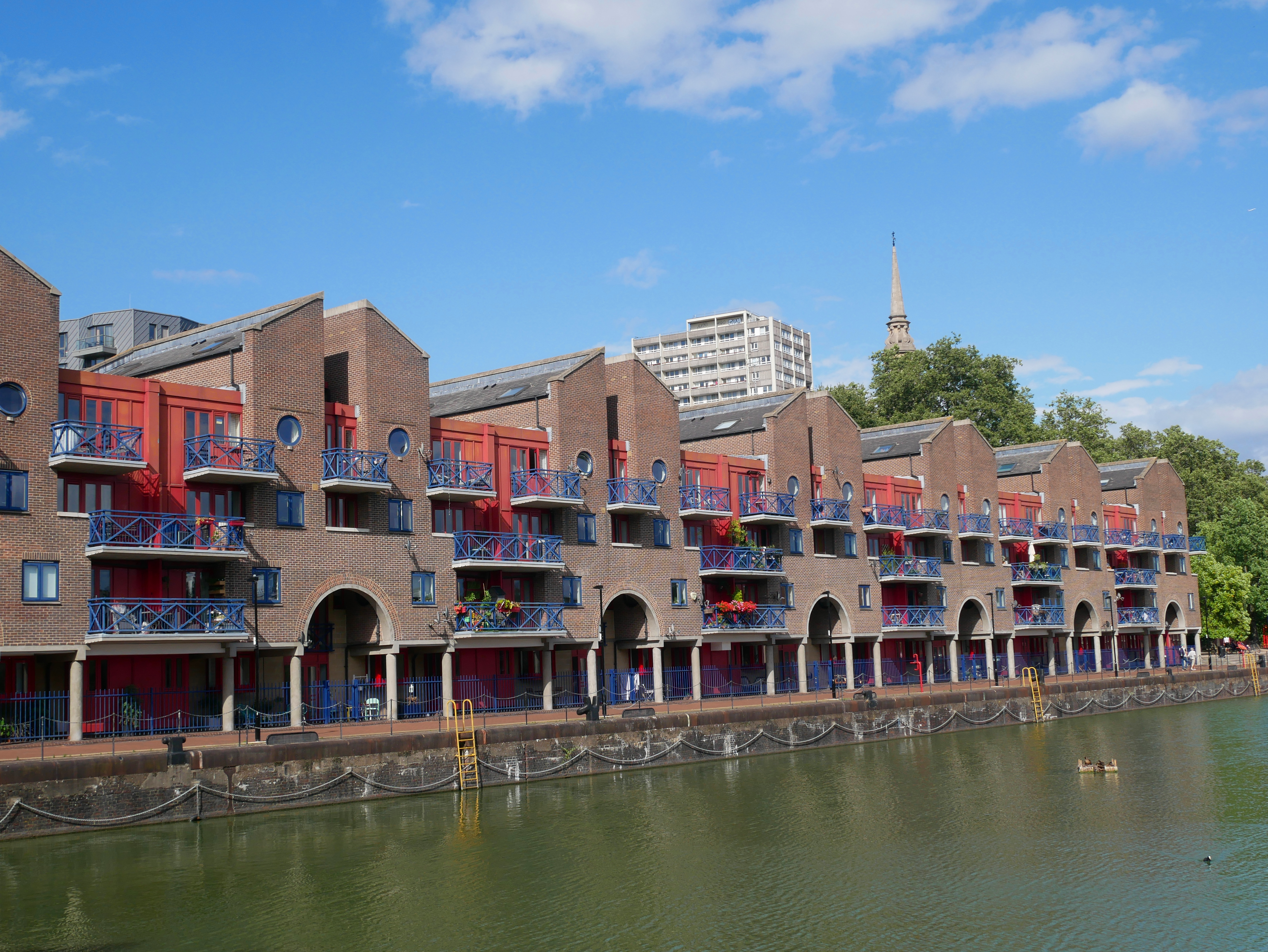
Part of the Shadwell Basin housing built in the 1980s; an example of postmodern architecture, it is now Grade II listed

In 2006 local Housing Association, Tower Hamlets Community Housing (THCH) built a new block of flats in Shadwell, adjacent to the existing flats at the corner of Cable Street and Devonport Street, called Thirza House. It was opened by Mildred Gordon, a former Shadwell resident and MP for the area from 1987 to 1997. As part of the new development THCH built a hop garden.

Since 2007, THCH have held a Hop Festival every September in the hop garden to commemorate the tradition of generations of East Enders temporarily migrating to Kent's hop gardens to harvest the hops. THCH have produced souvenir booklets containing historical photos of East Enders harvesting hops which are available from Tower Hamlets Community Housing. In 2009 the Shadwell hops were harvested by the local residents and Brodies Brewery in Leyton used them to create a new beer called "Old Hopper's Brew". The beer sold out within a month.

== In popular culture ==
Wilfred Owen's poem "Shadwell Stair", previously alleged to be mysterious, was a straightforward elegy to homosexual soliciting in an area of the London docks once renowned for it, according to Jonathan Cutbill.

The 1967 film To Sir, with Love was shot in Shadwell.

The music video of the 1984 song "Smalltown Boy" by Bronski Beat was filmed at St George's Leisure Centre, a municipal swimming baths in Shadwell.

Shadwell, and in particular the fictional English Football League club Shadwell Town FC, are the setting for the 1995 BBC films football hooligan film I.D. and its 2016 sequel ID2: Shadwell Army.

== See also ==
- Stepney Historical Trust
- Wilton's Music Hall
