= Wapping railway station =

London Overground station

Wapping
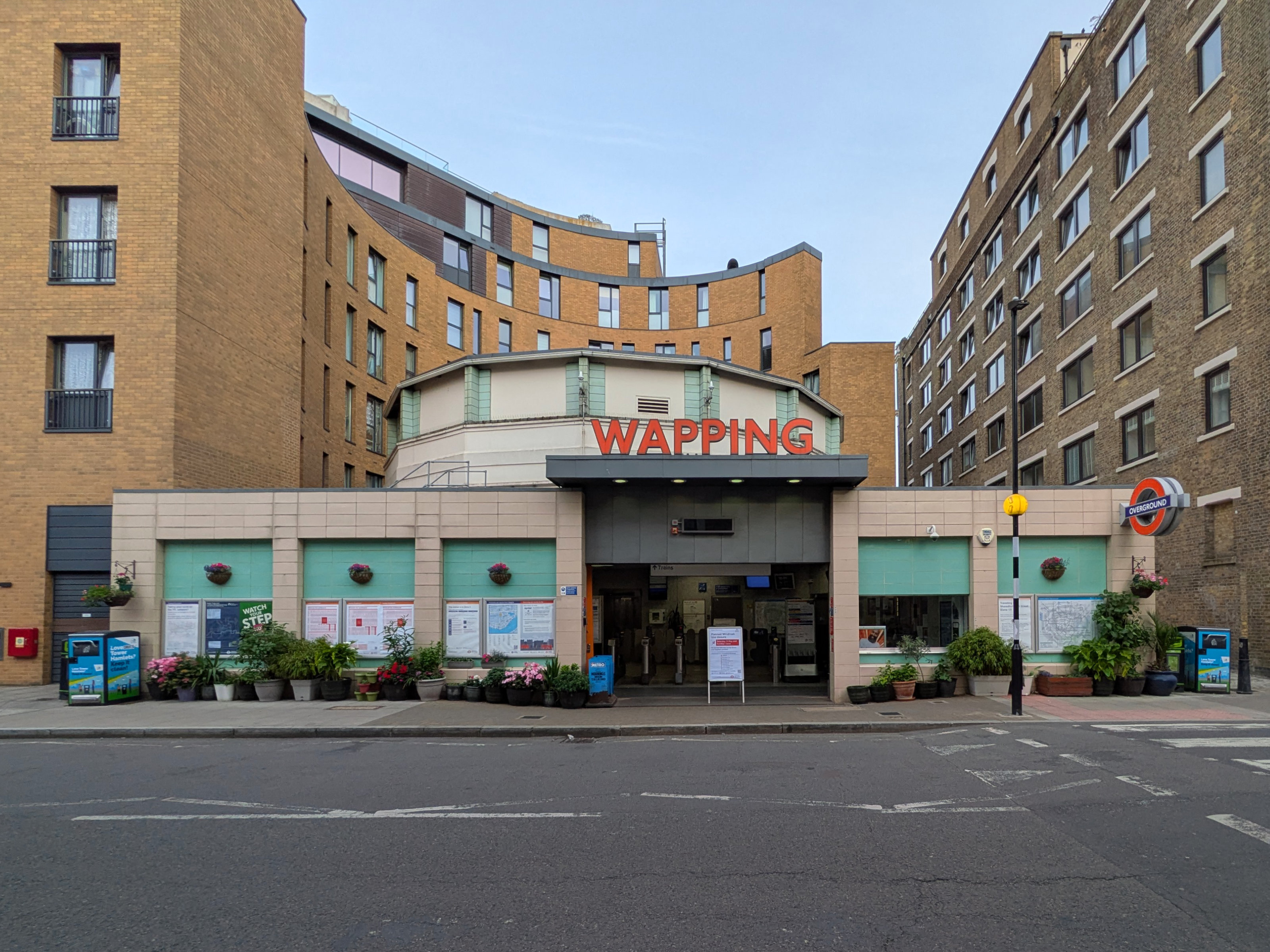
- Interactive map of Wapping

General information
- Location: Wapping
- Local authority: London Borough of Tower Hamlets
- Managed by: London Overground
- Owner: Transport for London
- Station code: WPE
- Number of platforms: 2
- Fare zone: 2

National Rail annual entry and exit
- 2020–21: ▼0.583 million
- 2021–22: ▲1.644 million
- 2022–23: ▲2.259 million
- 2023–24: ▲2.556 million
- 2024–25: ▼2.471 million

Key dates
- 7 December 1869: Opened as Wapping and Shadwell
- 10 April 1876: Renamed Wapping
- 1 October 1884: First Underground service
- 27 April 2010: Reopened

Other information
- External links: Departures; Facilities
- Coordinates: 51.5044°N 0.0558°W

Wapping is a station on the Windrush line of the London Overground, located on the northern bank of the River Thames in Wapping within the London Borough of Tower Hamlets. The station is between Shadwell and Rotherhithe stations, and is in London fare zone 2.

After temporary closures for remodelling, the station reopened for preview services on 27 April 2010 for services to New Cross and New Cross Gate, and from 23 May 2010 trains to and from New Cross Gate were extended to West Croydon and Crystal Palace.

== History ==
=== Construction ===
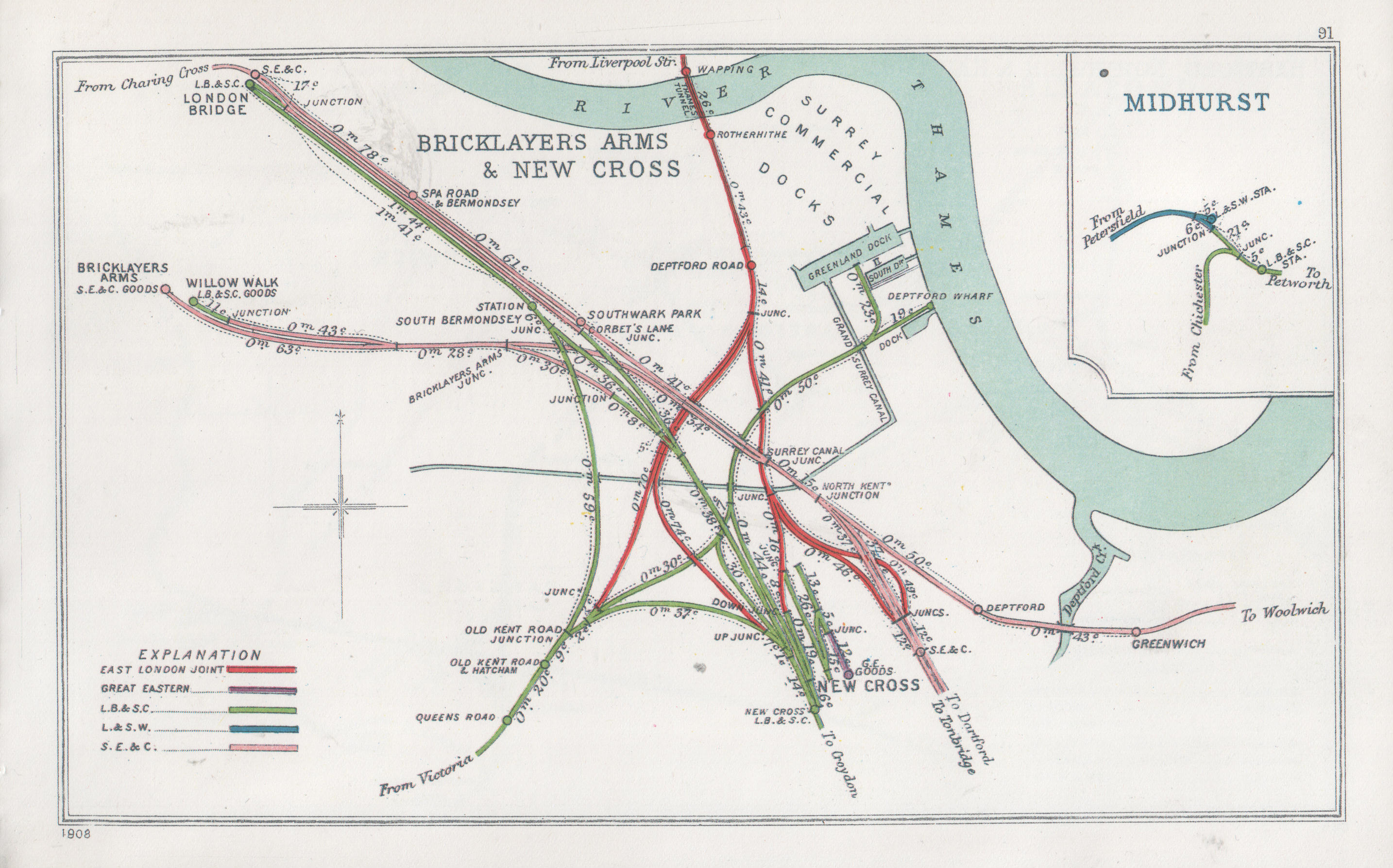
A 1908 Railway Clearing House map of lines in South East London, including the southern portion of the East London Line

The station occupies the north end of the former Thames foot tunnel built by Marc Isambard Brunel between 1825 and 1843, and subsequently adapted for railway traffic. Access to the station is by lift or a flight of stairs built into one of the original access shafts of the Thames Tunnel.

=== London, Brighton and South Coast Railway ===
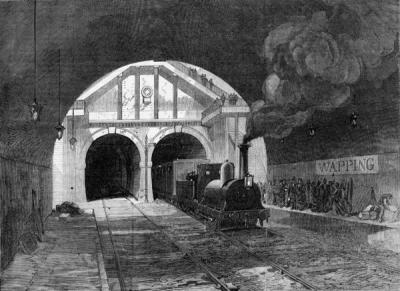
Locomotive exiting the Thames Tunnel and arriving at what is now Wapping station, 1870

The station was originally opened as the northern terminus of the East London Railway on 7 December 1869 as Wapping and Shadwell, and the station was renamed Wapping on 10 April 1876, when the line was extended northwards to Liverpool Street, via a new station at Shadwell. The earliest trains were provided by the London, Brighton and South Coast Railway, whose system connected with the line at New Cross Gate.

=== London Underground ===
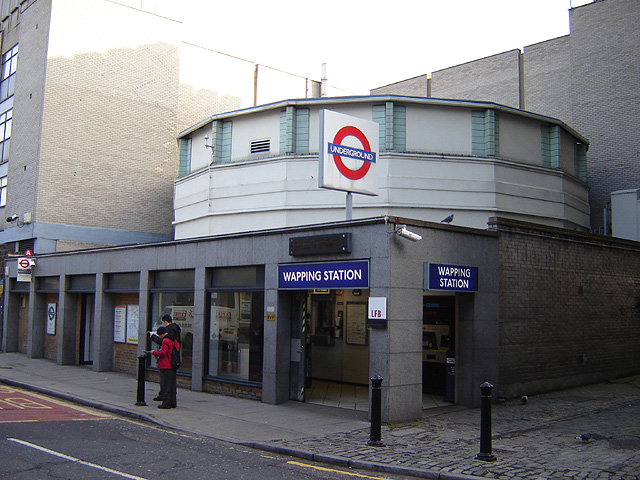
Wapping station as it appeared in 2006 with London Underground branding. The entrance has since been moved from the corner to the front.

Underground trains of the Metropolitan and the District Railways first served the station on 1 October 1884, but the station was last served by District trains on 31 July 1905.

In 1980, a London Underground plan to extend the Jubilee line to Woolwich Arsenal and Beckton was approved by Parliament. This included a station at Wapping between new stations at St Katharine Docks and Surrey Docks North, but was never built. The extension constructed in the 1990s followed a different route to the south of the River Thames.

The station was extensively remodelled between 1995 and 1998, when the entire East London line — including Wapping station — was closed due to repair work on the tunnels under the Thames. Vitreous enamel panels by Nick Hardcastle, showing the station and the area in former and modern times, were installed on the platforms.

=== London Overground ===
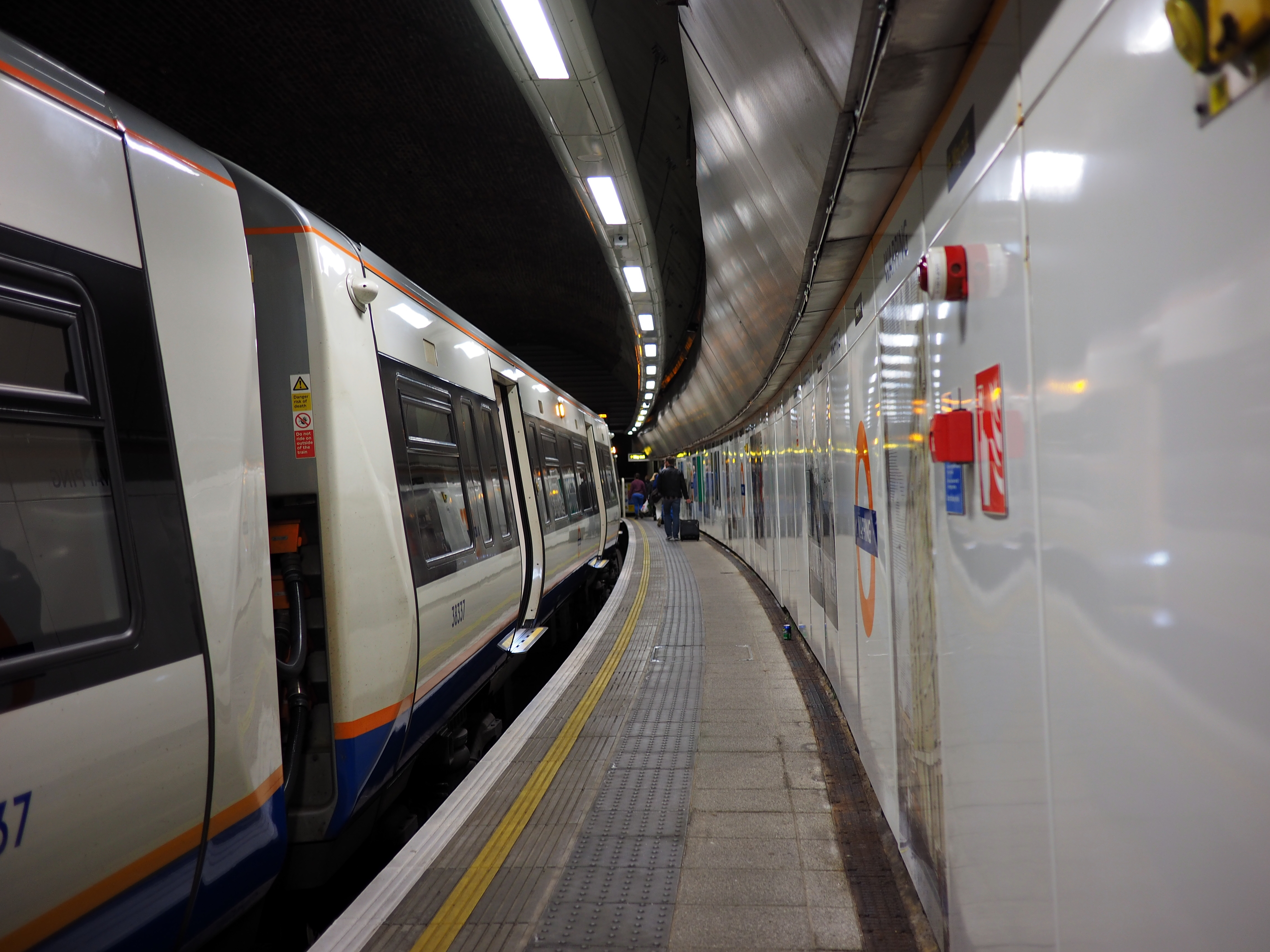
London Overground train at the northbound platform of Wapping station in 2015. The station's narrow and curved platforms have been identified as a safety hazard.

The East London line of the Underground closed on 22 December 2007, and reopened on 27 April 2010 when it became part of the new London Overground system. During this time the station was heavily refurbished.

The proposed extension of the East London line raised concerns that the station would have to be closed due to its platforms being too short (only four cars long) to accommodate the new rolling stock planned for the extended line (which could be six or eight cars long). The narrowness of the platforms was also a concern. The station does not fully meet the safety standards for an underground station but is permitted to operate under a derogation from His Majesty's Railway Inspectorate. Despite this, on 16 August 2004 then-Mayor of London Ken Livingstone announced that the station would remain open.

The station is served by National Rail London Overground services under the control of the London Rail division of Transport for London. There is however no standard red National Rail "double arrow" logo signage located at the station, instead only the Overground roundel.

== Services ==
All times below are correct as of the December 2010 timetables.

=== London Overground ===
==== Windrush line ====
Wapping is served by the Windrush line of the London Overground. On Mondays to Saturdays there is a service every 5–10 minutes throughout the day, while on Sundays before 13:00 there is a service every 5–9 minutes, changing to every 7–8 minutes until the end of service after that. Current off peak frequency is:

- 8 northbound to Highbury & Islington
- 8 northbound to Dalston Junction
- 4 southbound to Clapham Junction via Peckham Rye
- 4 southbound to Crystal Palace via New Cross Gate
- 4 southbound to New Cross
- 4 southbound to West Croydon via Norwood Junction

== Connections ==
London Buses routes 100 and D3 serve the station.

== In popular culture ==
The Wapping railway station features in the 1967 film To Sir, with Love.

Preceding station	London Overground	Following station
Shadwell towards Dalston Junction or Highbury & Islington	Windrush line East London line and South London line	Rotherhithe towards Clapham Junction, Battersea Park, Crystal Palace, New Cross or West Croydon
Former services
Preceding station	London Underground	Following station
Shadwell towards Wimbledon, Richmond, Ealing Broadway or South Harrow	District line (1884–1905)	Rotherhithe towards New Cross Gate
Shadwell towards Shoreditch	East London line (1913–2006)	Rotherhithe towards New Cross or New Cross Gate
Shadwell towards Hammersmith	Metropolitan line (1884–1906, 1913–1939)	Rotherhithe towards New Cross or New Cross Gate
Abandoned Plans
Preceding station	London Underground	Following station
St Katharine Docks towards Stanmore	Jubilee line Phase 3 (1980) (never constructed)	Surrey Docks North towards Woolwich Arsenal or Beckton
