= Eliza Wesley =

English organist

- Born: 1819
- Died: 1895 (aged 75–76)
- Resting place: Highgate Cemetery
- Known for: Organist
- Father: Samuel Wesley (composer, born 1766)

Eliza Wesley (1819-1895), born to Samuel Wesley and Sarah Suter was an organist and music editor. Her mother was Samuel Wesley's second wife. Eliza is the granddaughter to Charles Wesley, grandniece of John Wesley, and sister to Samuel Sebastian Wesley (1810-1876). She lived to the age of 76.

Eliza Wesley worked as the organist at St Katherine Coleman's, Fenchurch Street and St Margaret Pattens Rd Lane.

Throughout her life, Eliza Wesley advocated for her father's musical legacy to receive public recognition.

The publication of Letters of Samuel Wesley to Mr. Jacobs, Organist of Surrey Chapel, Relating to the Introduction into This Country of the Works of John Sebastian Bach Edited by His Daughter Eliza Wesley (London: William Reeves) in 1875 was seen as a crucial influence in making Bach's music more widely known at the time.

Eliza Wesley indexed her father's musical repertoire for Sir George Grove's "Dictionary of Music".

Eliza Welsey's autograph album of notable persons of her time, such as Dickens, Macready, Garibaldi and Mendelssohn, is now available at the British Museum .

Her obituaries emphasize her strong role in publishing through regular contributions to musical periodicals and her connection with other organists and musicians of her time.

She is laid to rest at Highgate Cemetery.

== Works edited by Eliza Wesley ==
- Wesley, Samuel. Letters of Samuel Wesley to Mr. Jacobs ... Relating to the Introduction into This Country of the Works of John Sebastian Bach. Edited by ... Eliza Wesley. London ; Hinrichsen Edition, 1958. Print.
- Wesley, Samuel, and Eliza Wesley. “A Selection of Pianoforte Works, edited ... by ... E. Wesley.” 1890: n. pag. Print.
- Wesley, Samuel, and Eliza Wesley. “Pianoforte Works by S. Wesley. Edited and fingered by his daughter, Eliza Wesley. 1. March in B flat ... 2. The Christmas Carol, varied as a Rondo. 3. A Sonata ... 4. Polacca in G. ... 5. Sonata in C (posthumous). no. 3.” 1880: n. pag. Print.

== Sources ==
- "Comments on Events". Musical news. Vol. 2, no. 55. 18 March 1892. pp. 265–267. ProQuest 7430807.
- "Advertisement". Musical news. Vol. 8, no. 221. 25 May 1895. p. 477. ProQuest 7252022.
- Miss Eliza Welsey. (1895, June 1). The Musical Herald, 181. Edwards, F. G. (ed.).
- Sladen, S. (Rev), “Eliza Wesley.” Notes and queries 4.104 (1911): 508 (23 December). DOI https://doi.org/10.1093/nq/s11-IV.104.508f
- Grove, George (1928). Grove's Dictionary of Music and Musicians. Third Edition. Ed. by H. C. Colles, London: Macmillan.
- Adams, Thomas (1836-1850). Letter to Eliza Wesley. The National Archives. (Link to Record)
