= St Martin, Ludgate =

Coordinates: 51°30′50.55″N 0°6′6.99″W

St. Martin, Ludgate
- Guild and Ward Church of Saint Martin within Ludgate
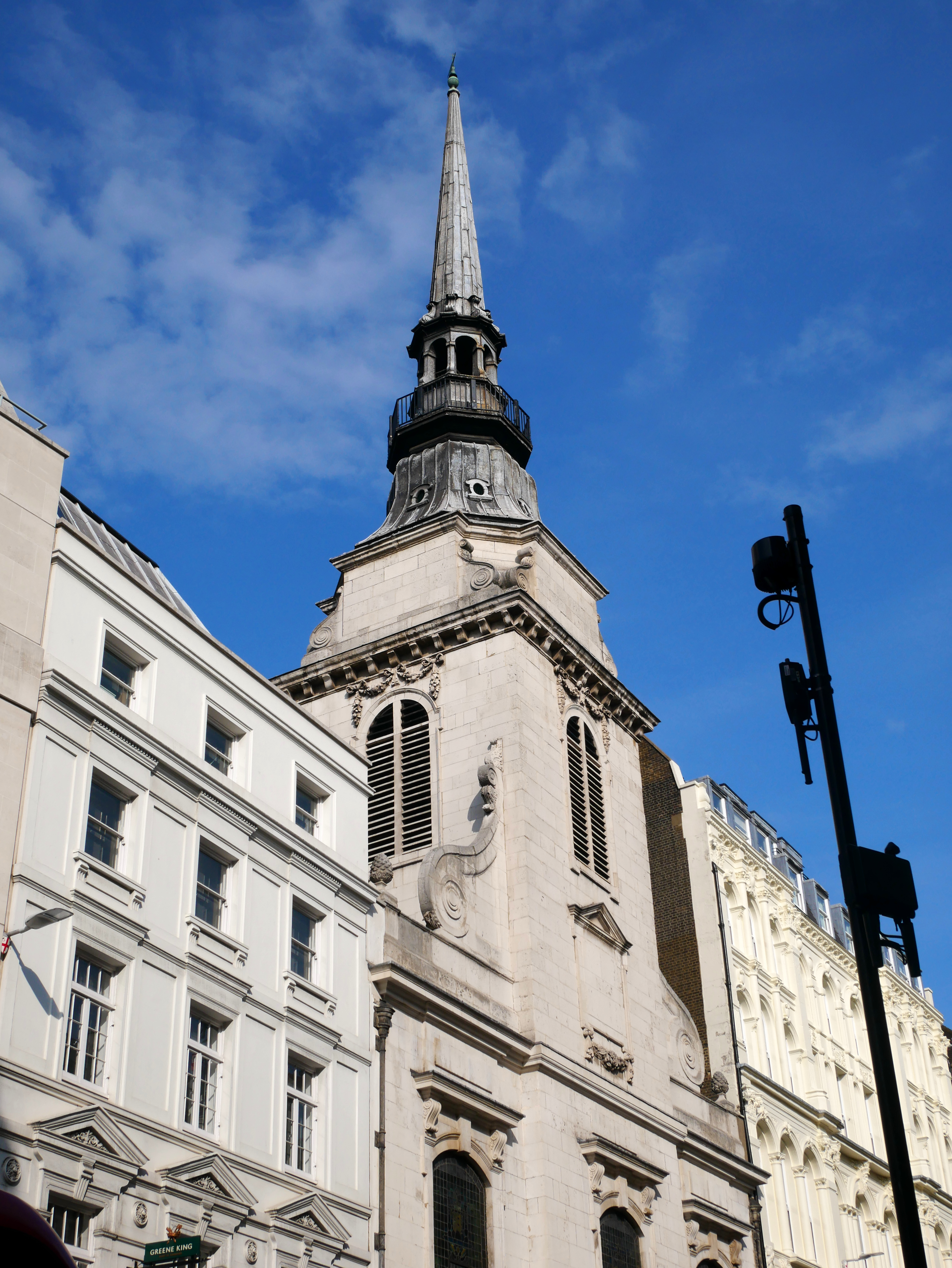
- The spire of the church

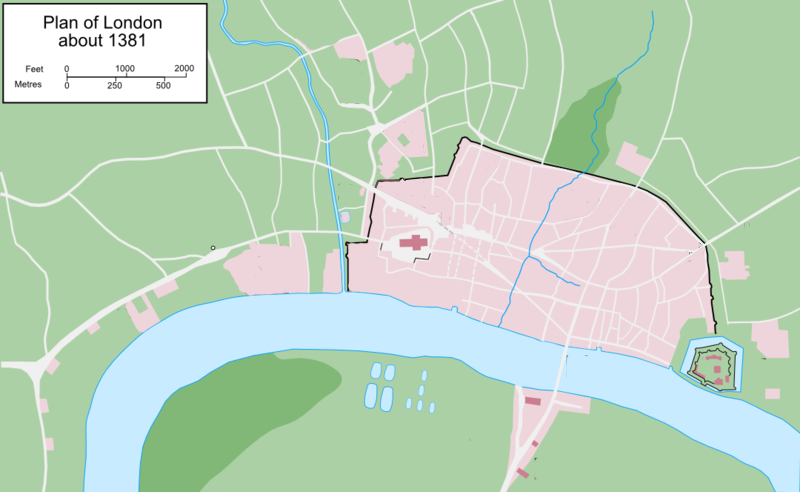
- Location within City of London Location within City of London in 1300
- Location: 40 Ludgate Hill, City of London, EC3
- Country: England
- Language(s): English and Mandarin
- Denomination: Church of England
- Previous denomination: Roman Catholic (to 1538)
- Website: standrewbythewardrobe.org/ludgate/

History
- Founded: Before 1174
- Dedication: Martin of Tours

Architecture
- Heritage designation: Grade I listed building
- Architect: Christopher Wren
- Style: English Baroque

Administration
- Diocese: London
- Parish: St Andrew by the Wardrobe

St Martin, Ludgate, also known as St Martin within Ludgate, is an Anglican church on Ludgate Hill in the ward of Farringdon, in the City of London. The church is of medieval origin, but the present building dates from 1677 to 1684 and was designed by Sir Christopher Wren.

== History ==
Some legends connect the church with legendary King Cadwallo (now usually referred to as Cadwallon ap Cadfan, father of Cadwaladr). A sign on the front of the church reads "Cadwallo King of the Britons is said to have been buried here in 677". Modern historians would place his death about 682. Cadwallo's image was allegedly placed on Ludgate, to frighten away the Saxons. However, Middlesex and the London area were controlled by the Anglo-Saxon polities at that time and there is no evidence of British or any other occupation of the intramural area of the abandoned 'Londinium' since the late fourth century. Previously the sign stated that it was the West Saxon king Caedwalla but this was contradicted by Bede's writings that he was buried in Rome. However the earliest written reference is from 1174. It was dedicated to Martin of Tours; as patron saint of travellers his churches were often placed near city gates. A Blackfriars monastery was built nearby in 1278. The church was rebuilt in 1437 and the tower was struck by lightning in 1561. The parish books start from 1410. Before the Reformation, the church was under the control of Westminster Abbey, and afterwards under St. Paul's Cathedral.

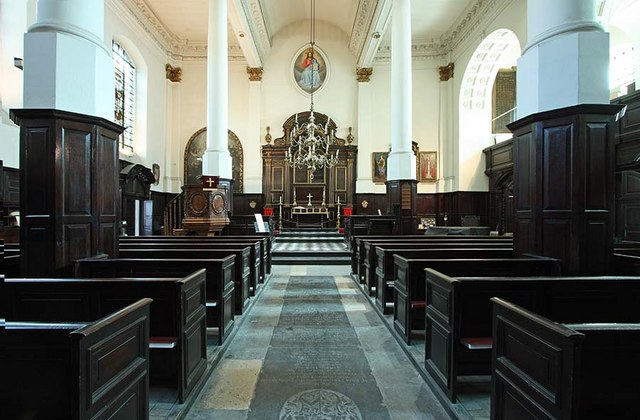
Interior of St Martin Ludgate

A blue plaque next to church records the earlier presence of Ludgate, demolished 1760. The church consists of a lead-clad dome, topped by a lantern and on top of that a sharp obelisk steeple. From the lower part of Fleet Street the steeple stands between the viewer and the dome of St Paul's Cathedral. Wren probably planned to make a contrast between the spiky steeple of St Martin's and the circular dome of St Paul's.

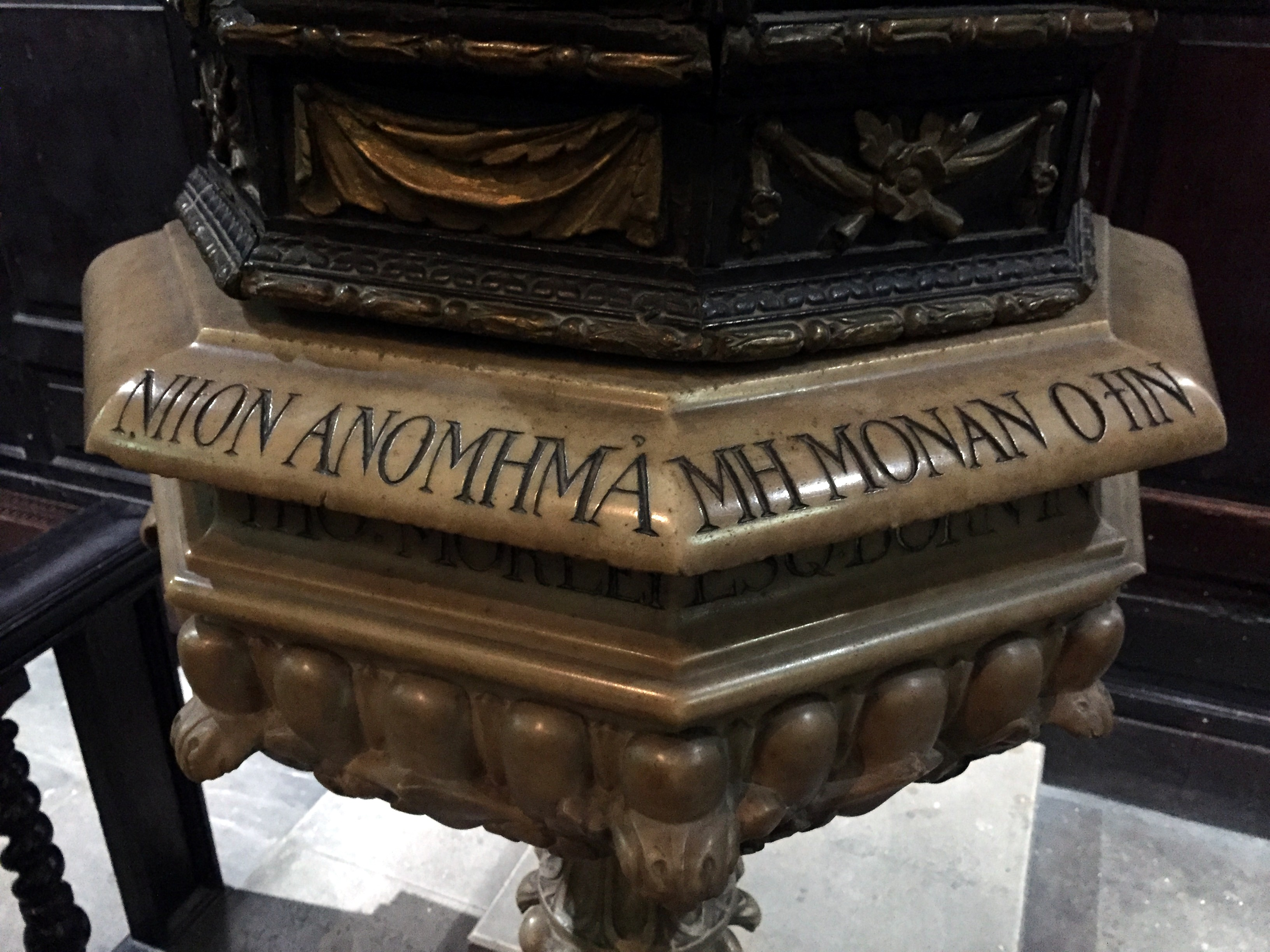
Palindrome on the font

In "The Roaring Girl, or Moll Cutpurse" by Dekker and Middleton, Sebastian says "The clock at Ludgate, sir, it ne'er goes true". This might refer to St Martin's church. "I owe you three farthings, say the bells of St Martin", might refer to this church, but is more likely to refer to St Martin Orgar in Cannon Street (previously Eastcheap). In 1614 Samuel Purchas, a travel writer, became the rector. On the 17th century font there is a Greek palindrome – ΝΙΨΟΝ ΑΝΟΜΗΜΑΤΑ ΜΗ ΜΟΝΑΝ ΟΨΙΝ Nipson anomemata me monan opsin (Wash the sins, not only the face). There is a 17th-century carved oak double churchwarden's chair – the only one of its kind known to exist. The north windows are by Powell of Whitefriars, representing the Abbot and Chapter of Westminster, the Bishop of London, and the Dean of St Pauls. Those high up on the south are also by Powell.

The medieval church was repaired in 1623, only to be destroyed in the Great Fire of London in 1666. Rebuilding was not immediate, but was largely completed by 1680, finished in 1703. In 1669 a Roman tombstone, now in the Ashmolean Museum, was found. The current design is topped by a lead-covered octagonal cupola supporting a balcony and tapered spire rising to a height of 158 ft (48 m). The centre of the church is in the form of a Greek cross, with four large columns. The chandelier dates from about 1777 and comes from St Vincent's Cathedral in the West Indies. As a curiosity, this is from the burial register: "“1615, February 28, St. Martin’s, Ludgate, was buried an anatomy from the College of Physicians.” (It was first noticed by Andrew Lang, in an article in "Books and Bookmen"). The Royal College of Physicians were based in Amen Corner, a few yards away from 1614 to 1666. In 1678 Robert Hooke designed a new hall in Warwick Lane, also nearby.

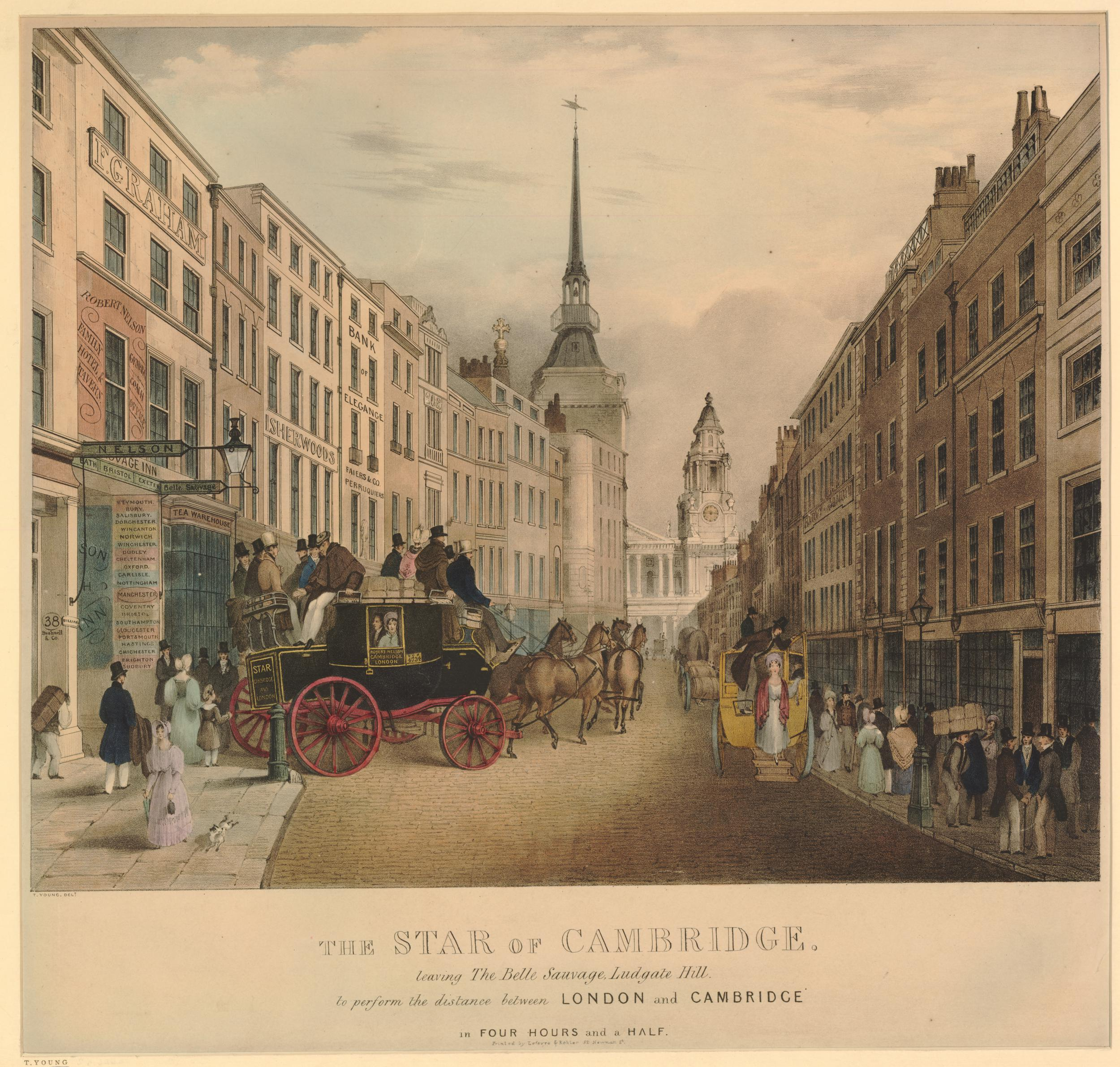
St Martin's depicted in a lithograph, c. 1820s

The view from the steeple towards the river is spectacular. It was painted by T.M. Baynes.

In 1893 to 1894, the church underwent a major rebuilding and alteration, with the floor level raised, and many bodies disinterred from the churchyard and reburied at Brookwood Cemetery.

In 1941, during the London Blitz, a German incendiary bomb damaged the roof, but St Martin's received relatively little damage during the Second World War. In 1954 St Martin's became a Guild Church and was designated a Grade I listed building on 4 January 1950.

== Organ ==
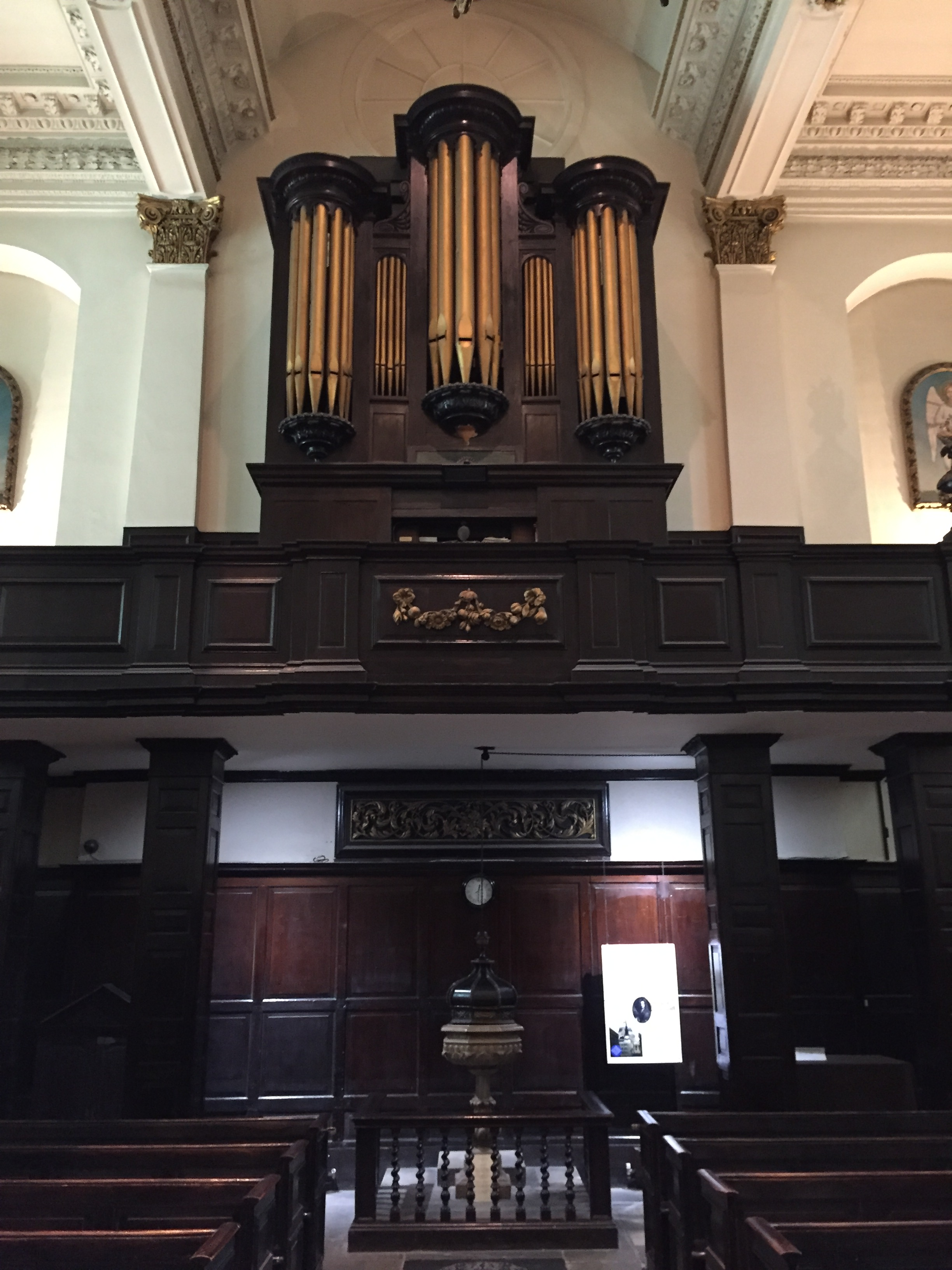
The organ of St Martin, Ludgate

The organ is a Bernard Schmidt design dating from 1684. There are carvings by Grinling Gibbons inside. The contemporary carvings in the church are also attributed to three joiners, Athew, Draper and Poulden, and to the carvers Cooper and William Newman. There are organ recitals every other Monday; chamber music every Wednesday and Friday.

A specification of the organ can be found on the National Pipe Organ Register.

Past organists at St Martin include:

- Frederick Albert Bridge (b. 1841 – d. 1917)

== See also ==
- List of churches and cathedrals of London
- List of Christopher Wren churches in London
