= London Buses route 100 =

London bus route

100
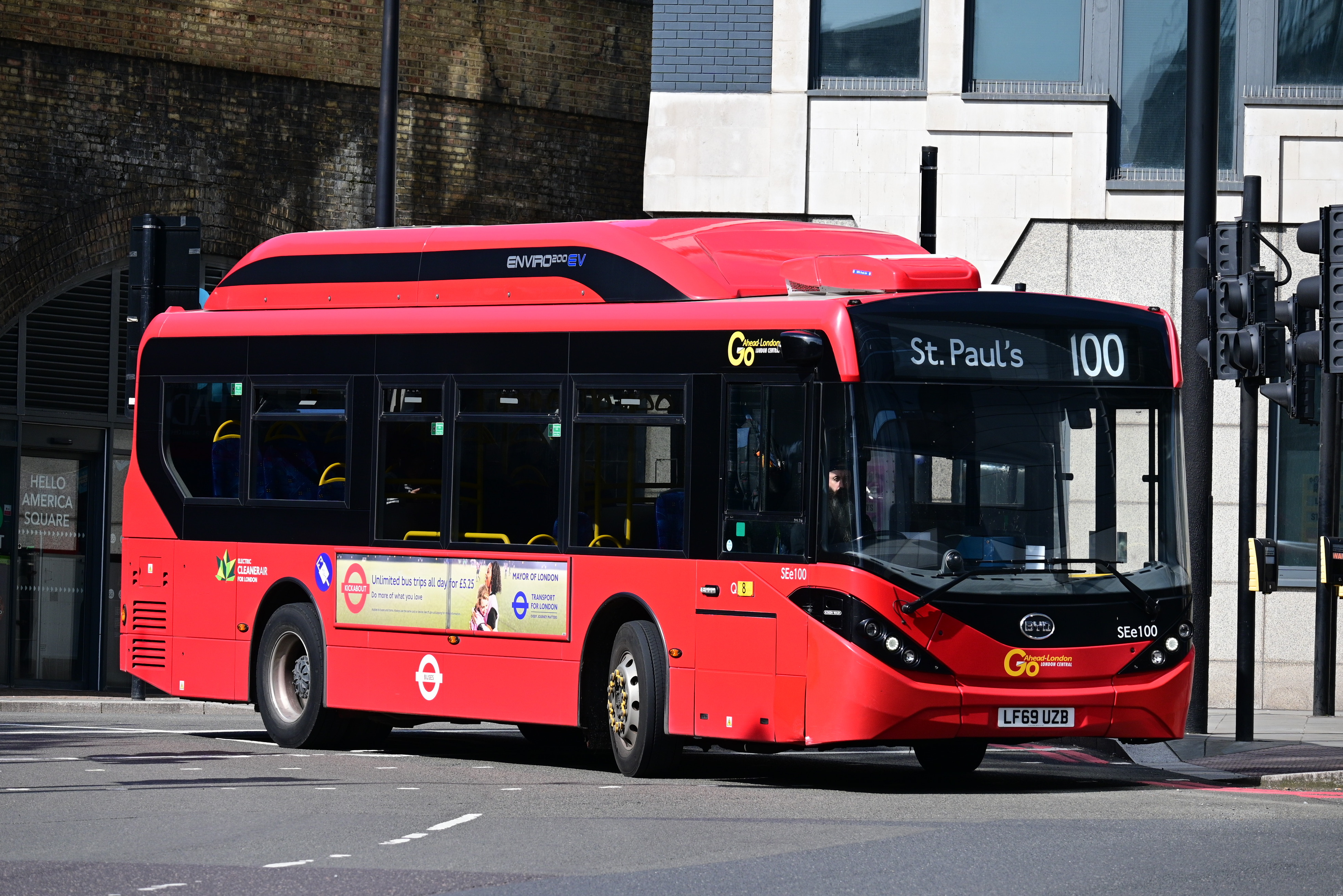
- London Central BYD Alexander Dennis Enviro200EV near Tower Hill station in April 2023

Overview
- Operator: London Central (Go-Ahead London)
- Garage: Camberwell
- Vehicle: BYD Alexander Dennis Enviro200EV
- Peak vehicle requirement: 9

Route
- Start: St Bartholomew's Hospital
- Via: St Paul's; London Wall; Moorgate; Aldgate; Wapping
- End: Shadwell station

London Buses route 100 is a Transport for London contracted bus route in London, England. Running between St Bartholomew's Hospital and Shadwell station, it is operated by Go-Ahead London subsidiary London Central.

== History ==
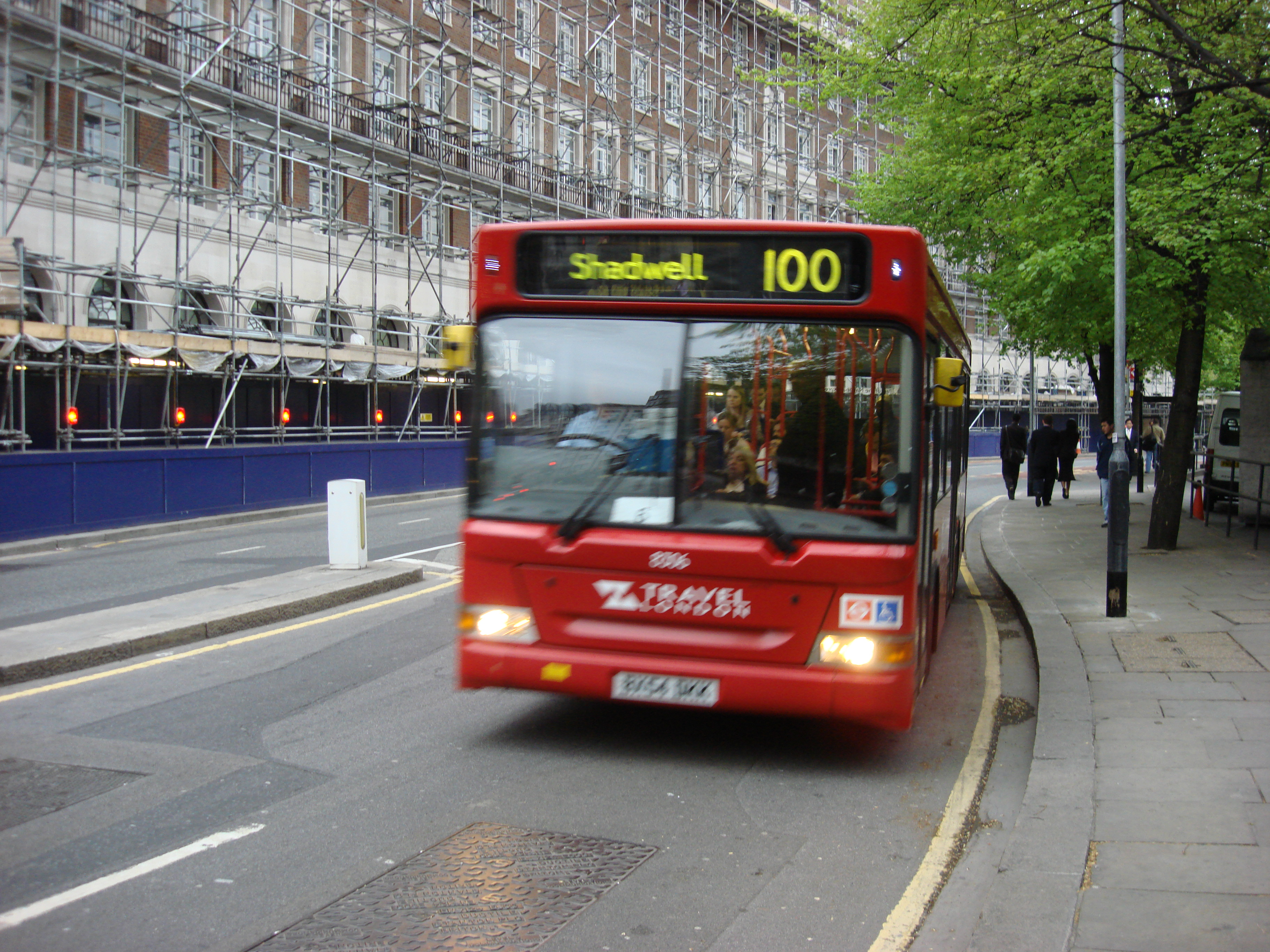
A Dart SLF single-deck bus operated by Travel London on route 100, April 2007

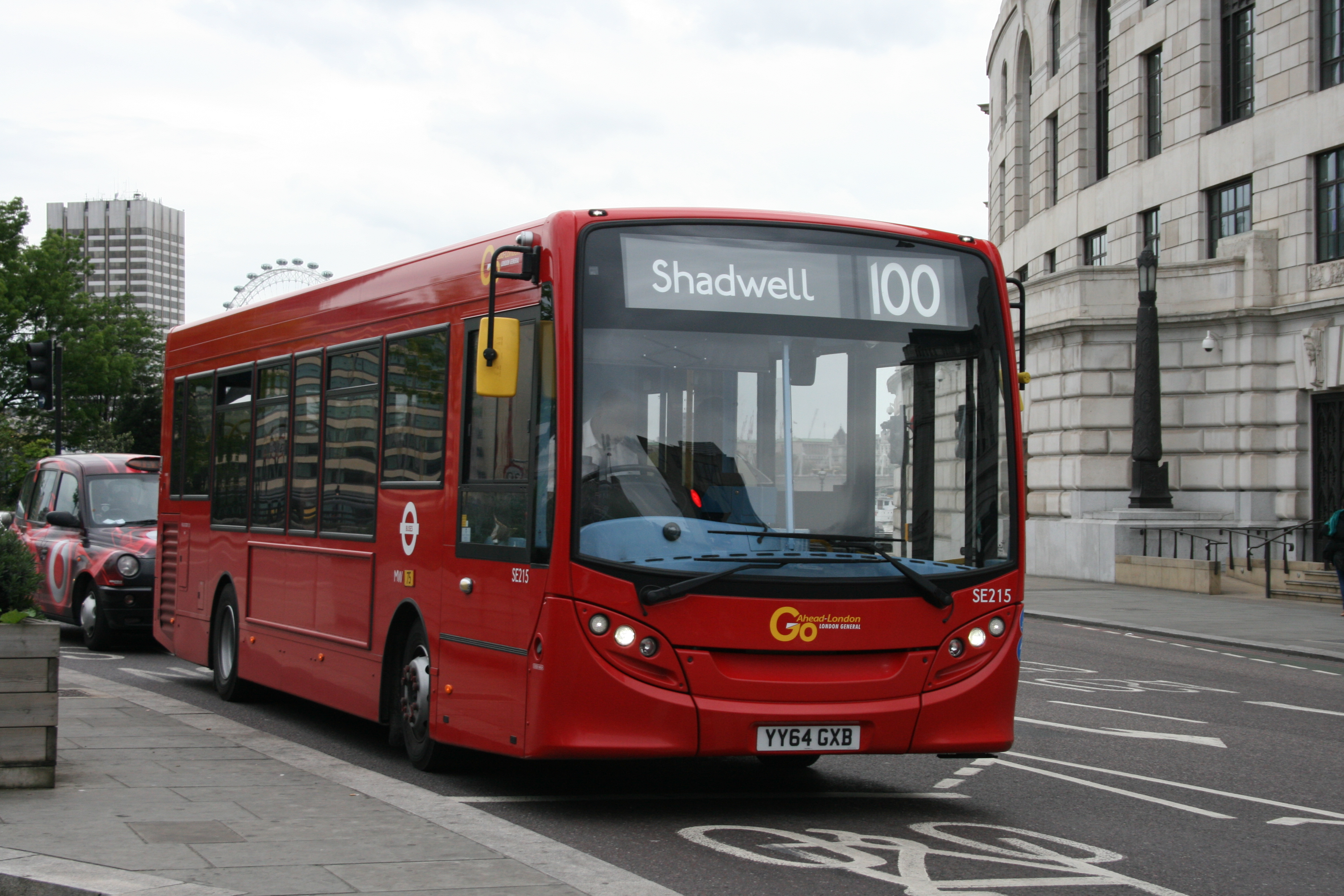
A Enviro200 single-deck bus operated by London General on route 100 in Blackfriars, April 2015

Between 1934 and October 1972 there was a route 100 operating between Barking and Beckton Gas Works.

The current route 100 commenced operating on 10 June 1989 from Liverpool Street station to Shadwell via Aldgate, Tower Hill and Wapping. It was operated by Leaside Buses' Clapton garage. On 24 February 1990, it was transferred to East London's Bow garage, and again on 26 September 1992 to Stratford.

Upon being re-tendered, it was retained by East London with a new contract commencing on 28 February 1998. Route 100 was extended from Liverpool Street to Elephant & Castle via London Wall and Blackfriars Bridge on 18 September 1999.

When next tendered, it passed to Travel London's Walworth garage on 18 September 2004.

Route 100 was included in the 21 May 2009 sale of Travel London to Abellio London. On 19 September 2009, Abellio London commenced a further contract to operate the route.

When next tendered, the contract to operate the route was awarded to London General with the handover occurring on 20 September 2014.

In September 2016, Transport for London opened a consultation on changing the route to only operate between Wapping and the Museum of London. The route was amended to operate between Shadwell and the London Wall on 8 April 2017 with route 388 replacing it to Elephant & Castle.

As part of TfL's Central London Buses Review, route 100 was extended from London Wall to St Paul's station.

In February 2020, a trial started to increase awareness of the electric buses introduced on the route by playing an artificial warning sound when the bus is at low speed, stationary or reversing.

As a result of road layout changes in the City of London, route 100 was extended from St Paul's station to St Bartholomew's Hospital from 29 August 2026.

== Current route ==
Route 100 operates via these primary locations:

- St Bartholomew's Hospital
- St Paul's station
- London Wall
- Moorgate station
- Wormwood Street
- Aldgate station
- Tower Gateway station
- St Katharine Docks
- Wapping station
- Tobacco Dock
- Shadwell station
