= Shadwell railway station =

London Overground station

Shadwell
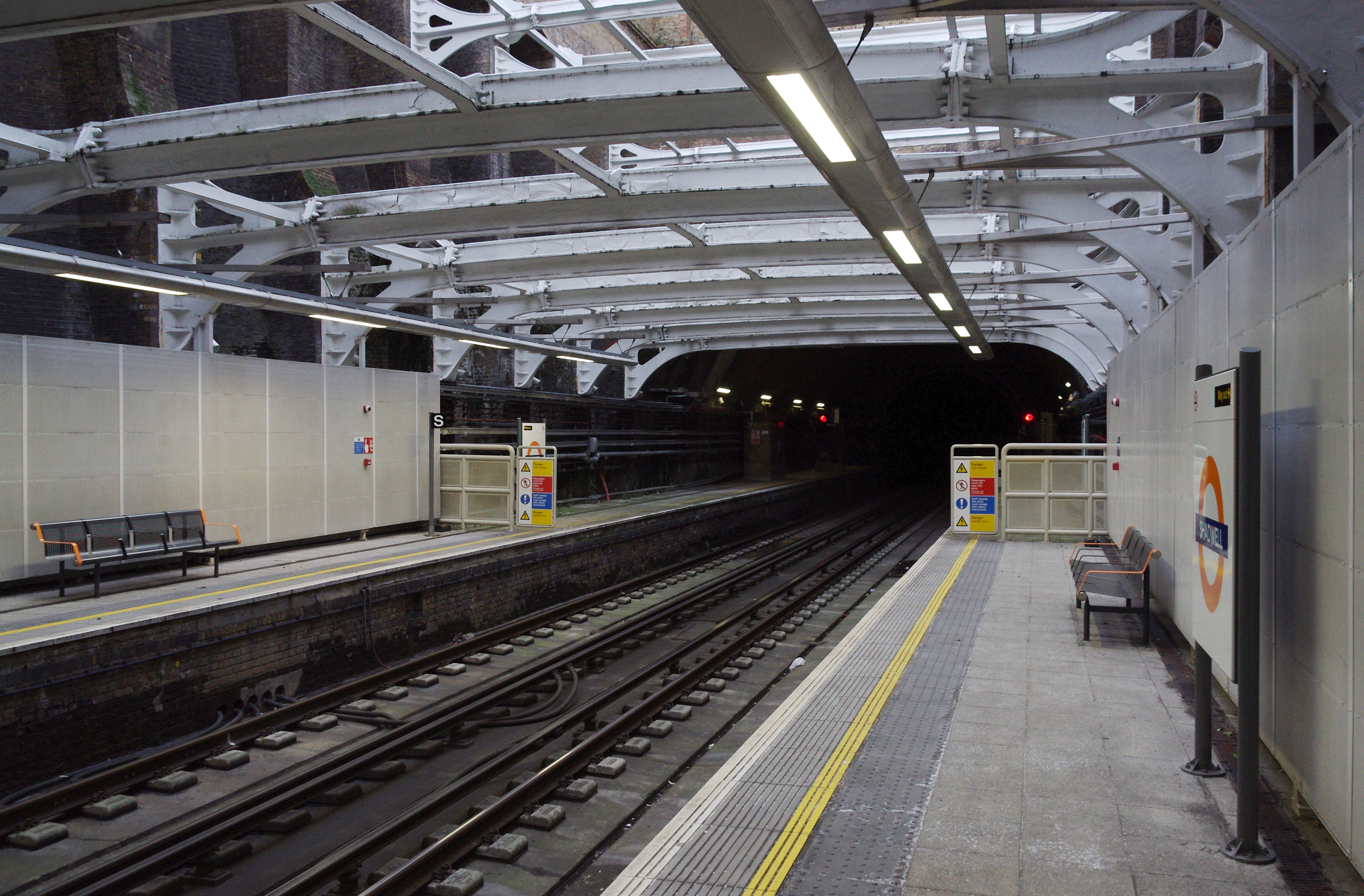
- Interactive map of Shadwell

General information
- Location: Shadwell
- Local authority: London Borough of Tower Hamlets
- Managed by: London Overground
- Owner: Transport for London
- Station code: SDE
- Number of platforms: 2
- Fare zone: 2
- OSI: Shadwell

National Rail annual entry and exit
- 2020–21: ▼1.245 million
- 2021–22: ▲3.095 million
- 2022–23: ▲3.706 million
- 2023–24: ▲3.934 million
- 2024–25: ▼3.917 million

Key dates
- 10 April 1876: Opened
- 22 December 2007: Closed
- 27 April 2010: Reopened

Other information
- External links: Departures; Facilities
- Coordinates: 51.5112°N 0.0569°W

Shadwell is a station on the Windrush line of the London Overground, located in Shadwell, East London. The station is between Whitechapel station to the north and Wapping to the south, in London fare zone 2. Both platforms, which are located underground, are decorated with enamel panels designed by Sarah McMenemy in 1995.

Shadwell was formerly a London Underground station on the East London line until 2007, when the East London line extension project converted the station to Overground operation. There is an official out-of-station interchange with Shadwell DLR station on the Docklands Light Railway, located 60 metres (200 ft) walk away.

== History ==
=== London Underground ===
The original station was opened in the parish of Stepney and was one of the oldest on the network, and was built over a spring. First opened by the East London Railway on 10 April 1876, it was first served by the District Railway and Metropolitan Railway on 1 October 1884. It was renamed Shadwell & St. George-in-the-East on 1 July 1900, but reverted to its original name in 1918. A new ticket hall was built on Cable Street in 1983, replacing the original building in Watney Street, which was demolished in May 2010. Access to the station platforms was through lifts or stairs. The station was closed between 1995 and 1998, owing to repair work on the East London line's Thames Tunnel. The typical off-peak East London line service from the station was:

- 9 tph to Whitechapel
- 5 tph to New Cross
- 4 tph to New Cross Gate

=== London Overground ===
The station closed on 22 December 2007; it reopened on 27 April 2010 for a preview service to New Cross and New Cross Gate, and from 23 May 2010, the latter service was extended to West Croydon / Crystal Palace, operated within the London Overground network. A new gated northern access fronting Cornwall Street has been added, easing interchange with Shadwell DLR station, while the rest of the station has been heavily refurbished.

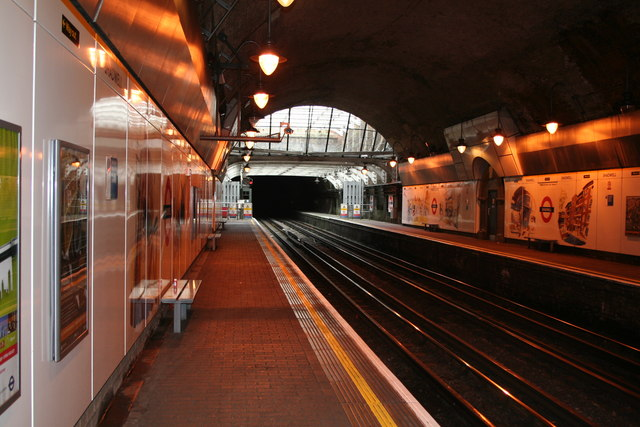
The station’s platforms while still in Underground service, pictured a few months prior to the line’s closure

== Services ==
All times below are correct as of the December 2012 timetables.

=== London Overground ===
==== Windrush line ====
There is a service every 3–5 minutes throughout the day on the Windrush line. Current hourly off-peak frequency is:

- 16 tph to Dalston Junction, of which 8 continue to Highbury & Islington
- 4 tph to West Croydon
- 4 tph to Crystal Palace
- 4 tph to New Cross
- 4 tph to Clapham Junction via Peckham Rye

== Connections ==
London Buses routes 100, 339 and D3 serve the station.

Preceding station	London Overground	Following station
Whitechapel towards Dalston Junction or Highbury & Islington	Windrush line East London line	Wapping towards Clapham Junction, Crystal Palace, New Cross or West Croydon
Out of system interchange
Preceding station	DLR	Following station
Tower Gateway Terminus	Docklands Light Railway transfer at Shadwell	Limehouse towards Lewisham, Stratford, Beckton or Woolwich Arsenal
Bank Terminus	Docklands Light Railway transfer at Shadwell	Limehouse towards Lewisham, Stratford, Beckton or Woolwich Arsenal
Former services
Preceding station	London Underground	Following station
St Mary's (Whitechapel Road) towards Wimbledon, Richmond, Ealing Broadway or South Harrow	District line (1884–1905)	Wapping towards New Cross Gate
Whitechapel towards Shoreditch	East London line (1913–2006)	Wapping towards New Cross or New Cross Gate
St Mary's (Whitechapel Road) towards Hammersmith	Metropolitan line (1884–1906, 1913–39)	Wapping towards New Cross or New Cross Gate
