= London Overground =

London suburban rail network

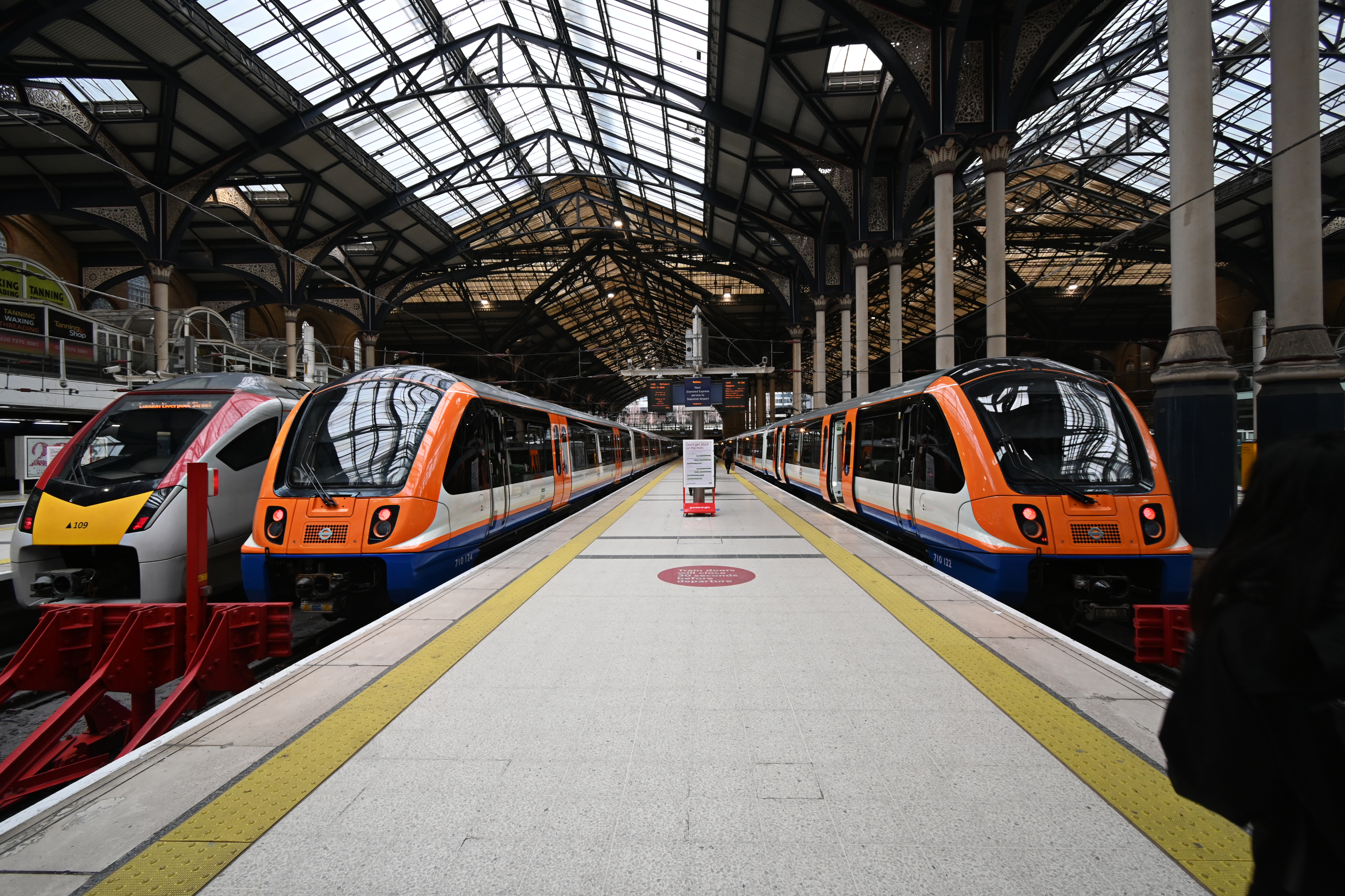
- A pair of London Overground Class 710s at London Liverpool Street next to a Greater Anglia Class 745

Overview
- Owner: Transport for London
- Locale: Greater London and Hertfordshire
- Transit type: Commuter rail
- Number of lines: 6
- Number of stations: 113 served (81 operated)
- Annual ridership: 189 million
- Website: tfl.gov.uk/modes/london-overground/

Operation
- Began operation: 11 November 2007; 19 years ago
- Operator: First Rail London (2026–2034)
- Reporting marks: LO (National Rail)

Technical
- System length: 167 km (103.8 mi)
- Track gauge: 1,435 mm (4 ft 8 1/2 in) standard gauge
- Electrification: Overhead line, 25 kV 50 Hz AC; Third rail, 750 V DC

The London Overground (also known simply as the Overground) is a suburban rail network serving London and some of its northern environs. Established in 2007 to take over Silverlink Metro routes, it now serves a large part of Greater London as well as Hertfordshire, with 113 stations on the six lines that make up the network.

The Overground forms part of the United Kingdom's National Rail network, but it is under the concession control and branding of Transport for London (TfL). Operation has been contracted to First Rail London since May 2026. TfL previously assigned orange as a mode-specific colour for the Overground in branding and publicity including the roundel, on the Tube map, trains and stations. In 2024, each of the six Overground lines was given a distinct colour and name.

== Background ==
London's inner rail network was developed in the 19th century. By 1914, much of the inner London passenger traffic had transferred to motor buses, electric trams and the London Underground. As outer suburban traffic grew in the interwar period, the inner and orbital rail services declined. By 1970, the remaining orbital services were the Broad Street to Richmond, Kentish Town to Barking, Stratford to North Woolwich, East London, South London and West London lines.

== History ==
=== Greater London Council and British Rail ===
In 1971, the Greater London Council (GLC), working with British Rail (BR), presented an orbital rail route proposal to the Greater London Development Plan inquiry. This proposed connecting existing lines and the construction of a tunnel under the River Thames to connect Poplar with Brockley. This route had also appeared in the 1943 County of London Plan as a freight line. Separately, the National Council on Inland Transport submitted to the inquiry a proposal for an 'Outer Circle' rail service. This proposed using the existing Thames Tunnel rather than constructing a new one. The inquiry report, published in December 1972, recommended further studies into orbital rail.

In November 1972, the RingRail report was introduced with a press release from Nigel Spearing MP. (Note: Professionally published copies of the report were launched at a press conference in February 1973.) Spearing proposed an orbital line, crossing the river by a new tunnel at Canning Town that would connect with the Angerstein Wharf branch line. RingRail was adopted as policy going into the April 1973 Greater London Council election by the winning Labour Party. The GLC did not have powers over BR within London, but could give grants to support services. However, BR policy favoured radial services and there was resistance to running an orbital railway. The London Rail Study ("Barran Report") of 1974 recommended improvements to existing non-radial services in North London. The full orbital RingRail route had been considered but was not included in the report recommendations.

The RingRail group submitted a report to the GLC transport committee in October 1975 with recommendations for improvements to existing services. In November 1975, BR told the GLC they would require subsidy to maintain the current service levels. In 1977, BR and the GLC agreed to prioritise a new Camden Road to North Woolwich service, reopening to passengers the line from Dalston to Stratford with new and refurbished stations. The diesel Crosstown Linkline service started operating in May 1979.

On 5 January 1981, the Kentish Town to Barking service was diverted to Gospel Oak at the western end. This improved opportunities for orbital journeys because of the interchange with the North London line. The service frequency was increased at off-peak times. In July 1982, the GLC approved funding to BR to electrify the line from Dalston to North Woolwich. From May 1985, the electric North London line service from Richmond was diverted away from Broad Street to North Woolwich and the Crosstown Linkline service was replaced.

The GLC lost its ability to provide new grants to BR from June 1984. Existing plans to fund improvements to the West London and South London lines could not be progressed with funding from the GLC. However, the GLC continued to influence public transport policy by funding and providing officer support to the London Centre for Transport Planning (LCTP). Through the LCTP, proposals were developed to improve services on the South London line. This included a new service from Clapham Junction to Woolwich Arsenal using existing infrastructure. The GLC commissioned a report by Steer Davies Gleave into the feasibility of running south London suburban trains onto the East London line. The GLC was abolished in 1986 and the development of rail policy by an elected Londonwide body ceased.

=== Interregnum ===
In 1987, Network SouthEast (NSE) introduced a new Victoria–Dartford service over part of the South London line. The Victoria–London Bridge service had been in decline over the previous decade and was reduced to run only at weekday peak hours. A local campaign was started in 1987 and the service was fully restored to all-day and all-week in stages between 1991 and 1996. NSE reintroduced passenger service to the whole of the West London line in 1994. (Note: The West London line was resignalled in order to provide access to the Eurostar depot at Old Oak Common and this enabled the reintroduction of passenger services.)

In July 1988, a preliminary report of the Nicholas Ridley commissioned East London Assessment Study was published, recommending a northern extension of the East London line to Dalston, over the now-disused Broad Street line. Within London Underground, proposals were developed for a Highbury/Dalston to Peckham service. (Note: The service was proposed to terminate at East Dulwich because of the difficultly of turning a train at Peckham Rye.) In September 1989, the London Underground board approved in principle extensions to Highbury/Finsbury Park and East Dulwich/Victoria. The December 1989 final report of the assesement study recommended three options for extending the East London line to the north. The first public consultation on the extension took place in 1990, with an expected completion date of 1994. However, Cecil Parkinson refused permission for it to proceed.

An East London Line Group (ELLG) was formed in 1992 to promote the extensions. Members included London borough councils and property developers. Michael Schabas produced a report that was published in February 1992. London Underground deprioritised a Peckham/East Dulwich extension because of unfavourable cost–benefit analysis. In publicity materials produced in 1993 and 1994, it was relegated to 'phase 2' and in the north, Dalston–Highbury was being promoted as 'phase 3'. An application was made for a Transport and Works Act order in 1993 for the Whitechapel–Dalston works, with an inquiry following in 1994. Government approval was given in 1997. In 1997, Lewisham Council published a report promoting a southern route to Croydon. (Note: The route had potential terminals at East Croydon, West Croydon and Crystal Palace.) In 1999, London Underground undertook a consultation with potential terminals at Highbury, West Croydon and Clapham Junction/Wimbledon.

In the run up to the 1997 United Kingdom general election, the orbital rail service proposal was revived by Transport 2000 and the Railway Development Society. An 'Outer Circle' network of interconnected services was proposed linking all the existing orbital services. The campaign was relaunched after the election with the addition of a route via Streatham Hill.

=== Greater London Authority ===
In July 2000, Londonwide elected government was restored, with the Mayor of London leading the Greater London Authority (GLA) and Transport for London (TfL). The 2001 Mayor's Transport Strategy committed to a full orbital railway called Orbirail, made up of several services at the core of a wider orbital network. Initially, the mayor had no rail powers to deliver these plans because of a protracted dispute with the UK government over the introduction of the London Underground public–private partnership.

The London Underground passed to mayoral control in July 2003 and London Rail was set up within TfL. Funding was authorised and responsibility for the East London line extensions passed from the Strategic Rail Authority to TfL in 2004. By 2005, it was still not clear who would be operating the extended East London line service. Running it as a passenger rail franchise was discounted as it would not allow enough control over operations. Continued operation by London Underground was considered. Instead, it was announced in April 2006 that it would be operated as a concession.

Ken Livingstone, then-mayor of London, wanted to take over all National Rail services wholly or substantially within the Greater London area. The relationship with UK government was initially poor and no progress was made until 2004. The Future of Rail white paper published in July 2004 suggested an increased role for the mayor in London rail services. The white paper was followed by the Railways Act 2005. This authorised the takeover of four services operated by Silverlink in north London. (Note: The services were the North London, West London, Gospel Oak–Barking and Watford DC lines. The Stratford–North Woolwich section of the North London line was earmarked for closure.) In March 2006, the London Assembly transport committee produced a report detailing the overcrowding problems on the North London line service. (Note: The London Assembly report was London's Forgotten Railway.)

In August 2006, a £223 million contract was signed with rolling stock manufacturer Bombardier for new trains. In September 2006, the 'London Overground' brand was announced for the former Silverlink services and the East London line, replacing the earlier Orbirail. In 2006, plans were announced for stations to be upgraded with ticket barriers and improved security. Oyster card would be fully accepted. In July 2007, the initial seven-year concession was awarded to London Overground Rail Operations (LOROL), a consortium of Laing Rail and MTR Corporation. (Note: The other bidders were Govia, National Express and Ned Rail.) Initially expected to take place in 2006, the takeover of services was delayed until November 2007 to give TfL time to prepare. The London Underground-operated East London line service was withdrawn in December 2007. (Note: Shoredich station closed earlier in June 2006 to enable works to start.)

=== Services begin and the completion of the orbital route ===
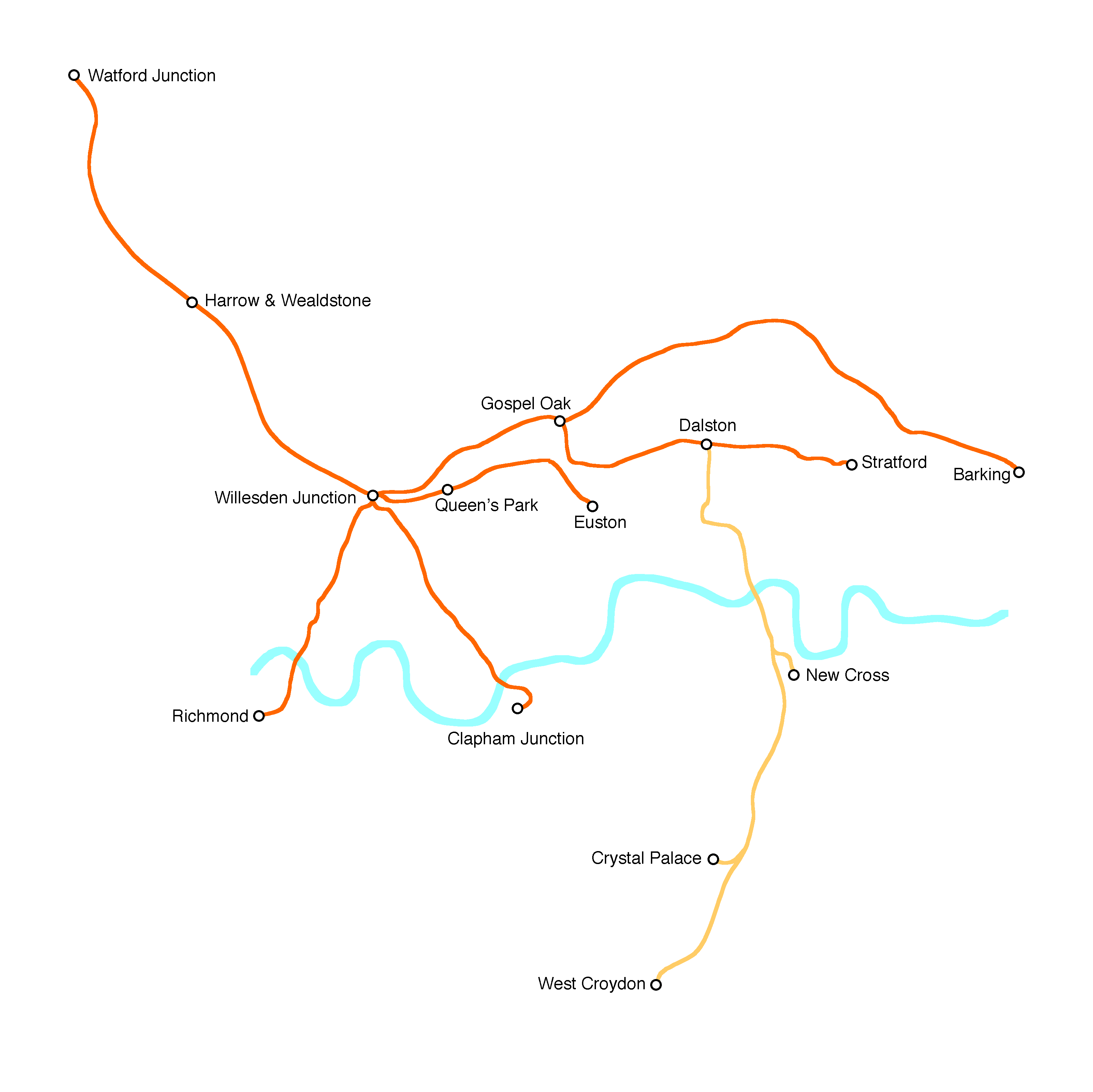
Initial London Overground network from November 2007 (orange) and the East London line in 2010 (light orange)

London Overground service commenced on 11 November 2007. As it was Remembrance Sunday, the official opening ceremony took place the next day at Hampstead Heath station. New high-level platforms opened for the North London line service at Stratford on 14 April 2009. (Note: The released low-level platforms were incorporated into the Docklands Light Railway extension to Stratford International.) Initially, the rolling stock inherited from Silverlink was used, with the first of the new Class 378 trains entering service on 29 July 2009.

Imperial Wharf was opened as a new station on the West London line on 28 September 2009. The North London line closed between Gospel Oak and Stratford from February to June 2010 for improvement works. This included the provision of an additional pair of tracks for freight use and to segregate the East London and North London lines between Highbury and Dalston. Platforms were lengthened and additional platforms constructed at Highbury and Canonbury. The works permitted an uplift in service frequency of up to eight trains an hour from Stratford.

Work on the northern part of the East London line extension commenced in June 2005. This included the restoration of the Kingsland Viaduct, new bridges, a short section of new viaduct and four new stations. Passenger service as part of the London Overground commenced on 27 April 2010. Initially running between Dalston Junction and New Cross/New Cross Gate, the service was extended to Crystal Palace/West Croydon on 23 May 2010 and to Highbury on 28 February 2011.

Clapham Junction was decided in 2002 as the final southern terminal of the East London line extension. However, it was not proceeded with at the same time as the other extensions. In July 2007, the ELLG started a campaign for the extension over the South London line. Funding of £75m was secured in February 2009. It did not include the proposed Surrey Canal Road station, although passive provision would be provided. The largest works were the reinstatement of the line between Surrey Quays and Queen's Road Peckham. Services between Surrey Quays and Clapham Junction commenced on 9 December 2012, finally completing the orbital route.

=== Further expansion ===
In February 2012, Boris Johnson, then-mayor of London published The Mayor's Rail Vision. This envisaged the eventual take over of all rail services within London. The Southeastern services in south London and Greater Anglia "West Anglia" services in northeast London were identified as the first candidates for transfer to the mayor. (Note: The West Anglia services were Liverpool Street/Stratford to Chingford, Enfield Town, Cheshunt and Hertford East. The Southeastern services were Charing Cross/Cannon Street/Victoria to Dartford, Orpington, Sevenoaks and Hayes.) In March 2012, the Department for Transport invited proposals for services to be run locally. In June 2012, the mayor formally asked to take over the Southeastern and West Anglia services. Both sets of services included sections outside Greater London in Hertfordshire and Kent, where there was hostility to the plans. In June 2013, the proposal to take over West Anglia services was accepted by the UK government, but the take over of Southeastern services was rejected. LOROL was selected to operate the services initially. On 31 May 2015, London Overground took over the West Anglia services from Liverpool Street to Enfield Town, Cheshunt and Chingford. (Note: Excluding services from Stratford and Hertford East along the West Anglia Main Line that had formed part of the proposal.) Services on the Romford–Upminster line were also taken over. (Note: Romford–Upminster services had not formed part of the proposal.) In January 2015, Andrew Adonis called for the mayor to take over all suburban rail in South London. (Note: This coincided with the publication of the Turning South London Orange report by the Centre for London.) In October 2015, the London Assembly transport committee published a report which recommended the creation of a "South London Metro". (Note: The London Assembly report was Devolving Rail Services to London: Towards a South London Metro.)

=== Gospel Oak to Barking line electrification and extension ===
It was announced in June 2013 that £115 million of funding for electrification was being made available as part of upgrades to rail infrastructure included in the government's 2013 spending round. At the same time Transport for London announced that they had obtained a £90 million commitment from the Chancellor of the Exchequer and the Secretary of State for Transport. In September 2015, Network Rail awarded the £56.9m contract to electrify the line to J. Murphy & Sons. Part closures (on weekends and from South Tottenham to Barking) were planned from June to late September 2016, followed by a full closure from October to February 2017, and further evening and weekend works until late June 2017, and finally around four months of further work to add the wires so that electric Class 710 trains can run from early 2018. The line was to be electrified using the NR Series 2 OLE range.

It was announced as part of the 2014 United Kingdom budget that the Gospel Oak to Barking line would be extended to Barking Riverside station. £263 million was to be spent to extend the line to the brownfield 10,800-home Barking Riverside housing development, which Barking and Dagenham Council did not believe to be viable without improved transport connections. The developers of the site, Barking Riverside Limited, would provide £172 million towards the project, with the remainder coming from Transport for London. Construction started in 2017 and was planned to be completed by 2021. London Overground services started running to Barking Riverside on 18 July 2022.

=== Night service ===
The Night Tube and London Overground Night Service

London Overground began running 24-hour trains on Friday and Saturday nights, similar to the Night Tube of London Underground, between Dalston Junction and New Cross Gate from 15 December 2017. In February 2018 the service was extended to Highbury & Islington, which interchanges with overnight services of the Victoria line.

== Network ==
The Overground lines appear on Tube maps issued by TfL, and a separate map of the system is available. The network interchanges with the Bakerloo, Central, Circle, District, Hammersmith & City, Jubilee, Metropolitan, Northern and Victoria tube lines, and also with the Docklands Light Railway, Elizabeth line and Tramlink networks.

London Overground network
Schematic map of the London Overground network

Geographic map of the London Overground network

=== Services ===
As of May 2025, the typical off-peak service pattern is:

Windrush line
Route	tph	Calling at
Dalston Junction to New Cross	4	Haggerston; Hoxton; Shoreditch High Street; Whitechapel; Shadwell; Wapping; Rotherhithe; Canada Water; Surrey Quays
Dalston Junction to Clapham Junction	4	Haggerston; Hoxton; Shoreditch High Street; Whitechapel; Shadwell; Wapping; Rotherhithe; Canada Water; Surrey Quays; Queens Road Peckham; Peckham Rye; Denmark Hill; Clapham High Street; Wandsworth Road
Highbury & Islington to Crystal Palace	4	Canonbury; Dalston Junction; Haggerston; Hoxton; Shoreditch High Street; Whitechapel; Shadwell; Wapping; Rotherhithe; Canada Water; Surrey Quays; New Cross Gate; Brockley; Honor Oak Park; Forest Hill; Sydenham
Highbury & Islington to West Croydon	4	Canonbury; Dalston Junction; Haggerston; Hoxton; Shoreditch High Street, Whitechapel; Shadwell; Wapping; Rotherhithe; Canada Water; Surrey Quays; New Cross Gate; Brockley; Honor Oak Park; Forest Hill; Sydenham; Penge West; Anerley; Norwood Junction
Mildmay line
Route	tph	Calling at
Richmond to Stratford	4	Kew Gardens; Gunnersbury, South Acton; Acton Central; Willesden Junction; Kensal Rise; Brondesbury Park; Brondesbury; West Hampstead; Finchley Road & Frognal; Hampstead Heath; Gospel Oak; Kentish Town West; Camden Road; Caledonian Road & Barnsbury; Highbury & Islington; Canonbury; Dalston Kingsland; Hackney Central; Homerton; Hackney Wick
Clapham Junction to Stratford	4	Imperial Wharf; West Brompton; Kensington (Olympia); Shepherd's Bush; Willesden Junction; Kensal Rise; Brondesbury Park; Brondesbury; West Hampstead; Finchley Road & Frognal; Hampstead Heath; Gospel Oak; Kentish Town West; Camden Road; Caledonian Road & Barnsbury; Highbury & Islington; Canonbury; Dalston Kingsland; Hackney Central; Homerton; Hackney Wick
Lioness line
Route	tph	Calling at
Watford Junction to London Euston	4	Watford High Street; Bushey; Carpenders Park; Hatch End; Headstone Lane; Harrow & Wealdstone; Kenton; South Kenton; North Wembley; Wembley Central; Stonebridge Park; Harlesden; Willesden Junction; Kensal Green; Queen's Park; Kilburn High Road; South Hampstead
Suffragette line
Route	tph	Calling at
Gospel Oak to Barking Riverside	4	Upper Holloway; Crouch Hill; Harringay Green Lanes; South Tottenham; Blackhorse Road; Walthamstow Queen's Road; Leyton Midland Road; Leytonstone High Road; Wanstead Park; Woodgrange Park; Barking
Weaver line
Route	tph	Calling at
London Liverpool Street to Enfield Town	2	Bethnal Green; Cambridge Heath; London Fields; Hackney Downs; Rectory Road; Stoke Newington; Stamford Hill; Seven Sisters; Bruce Grove; White Hart Lane; Silver Street; Edmonton Green; Bush Hill Park
London Liverpool Street to Cheshunt	2	Bethnal Green; Cambridge Heath; London Fields; Hackney Downs; Rectory Road; Stoke Newington; Stamford Hill; Seven Sisters; Bruce Grove; White Hart Lane; Silver Street; Edmonton Green; Southbury; Turkey Street; Theobalds Grove
London Liverpool Street to Chingford	4	Bethnal Green; Hackney Downs; Clapton; St James Street; Walthamstow Central; Wood Street; Highams Park
Liberty line
Route	tph	Calling at
Romford to Upminster	2	Emerson Park

Battersea Park railway station is served by an infrequent parliamentary train service from Dalston Junction, which terminates at Battersea Park instead of Clapham Junction. Since the reorganisation of services into the London Overground network, this has been the only service to use the link from platform 2 at Battersea Park to Wandsworth Road.

=== Depots ===
Windrush Line services are served by New Cross Gate Depot. Mildmay, Lioness, and Suffragette Line services are served by Willesden Traction Maintenance Depot. Weaver and Liberty Line are served by Ilford EMU Depot, Chingford Sidings and Gidea Park Sidings.

== Operations ==
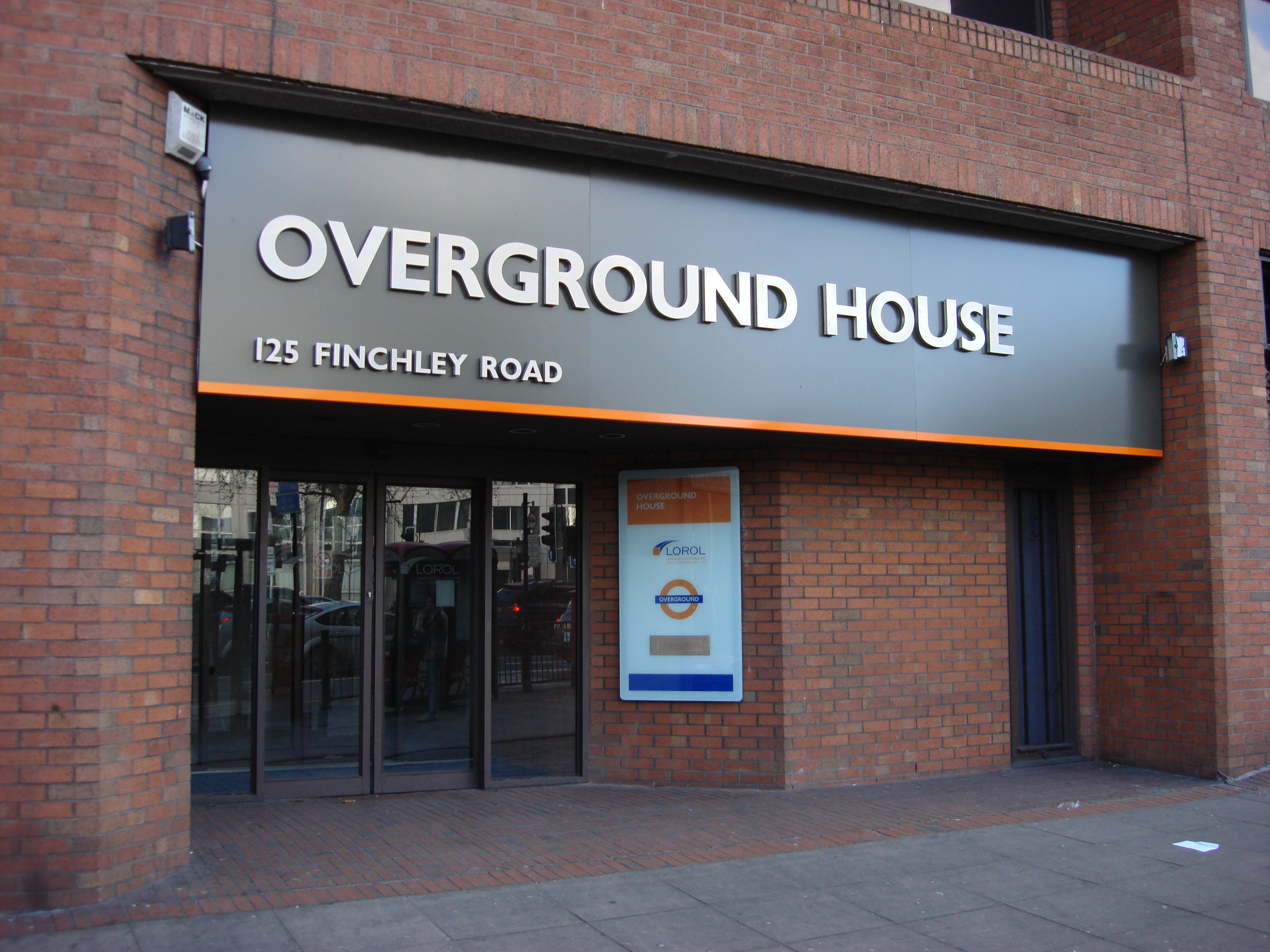
Overground House, the head office in Swiss Cottage

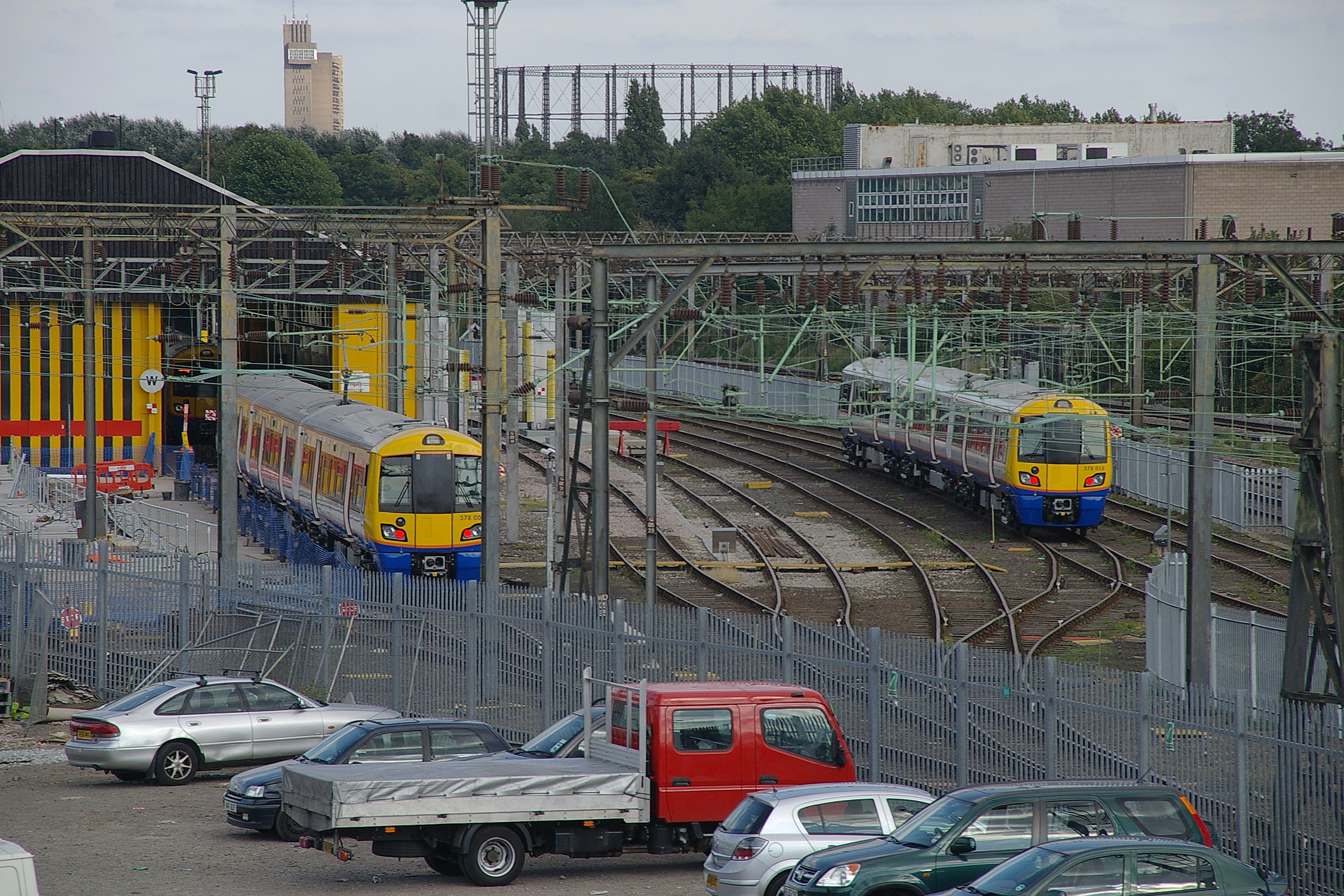
London Overground EMUs stabled at Willesden TMD

London Overground's head office and control centre are at Swiss Cottage. Rolling stock is maintained at Willesden Junction and New Cross Gate TMDs, the latter being newly built for the extended East London line. There are also sidings at Silwood Triangle (just north of New Cross depot), built in 2013–14. Satellite locations for stabling trains include Stratford, London Euston and sidings (mainly used by London Northwestern Railway), and c2c's East Ham Depot. Train crews are based at stations including Euston, Willesden Junction, Watford Junction, New Cross, Stratford and Gospel Oak. Up to the early 2010s, London Overground operated with a conductor or guard on its North London, West London and Gospel Oak services. With the other 60% of Overground services already operated by only a driver, it was decided in 2013 to convert these remaining two-person operated trains to driver only.

=== Operator ===
London Overground services are operated by First Rail London under an eight-year contract with TfL, which expires in 2034. Following a model similar to that used for the Docklands Light Railway, TfL invited tenders for operation of the services. Unlike other National Rail operators under the franchise control of the DfT, TfL sets fares, procures rolling stock and decides service levels. The operator takes only a small element of revenue risk, with TfL taking 90% and the operator 10%.

The first operator, London Overground Rail Operations, a 50:50 joint venture between Laing Rail and MTR Corporation, was chosen by TfL on 19 June 2007. Four bidders had been shortlisted to operate the concession – Govia, MTR/Laing Rail, National Express and NedRail. The contract was signed on 2 July 2007 for seven years with the option of a two-year extension. In preparation for the launch of the Overground, MTR Laing renamed itself London Overground Rail Operations. In February 2013, it was awarded a concession extension until 14 November 2016.

In July 2015, the shortlisted bidders for the next concession were Arriva UK Trains, ComfortDelGro, a Keolis/Go-Ahead joint venture and MTR Corporation. Arriva Rail London was awarded the contract, starting from 13 November 2016. In June 2023, Arriva were awarded a contract extension, pushing the expiry date to May 2026.

In November 2024, TfL invited expressions of interest in operating the next concession. In March 2025, four bidders were shortlisted. In December 2025, TfL awarded an eight-year contract to First Rail London, starting from 3 May 2026.

=== Ticketing ===
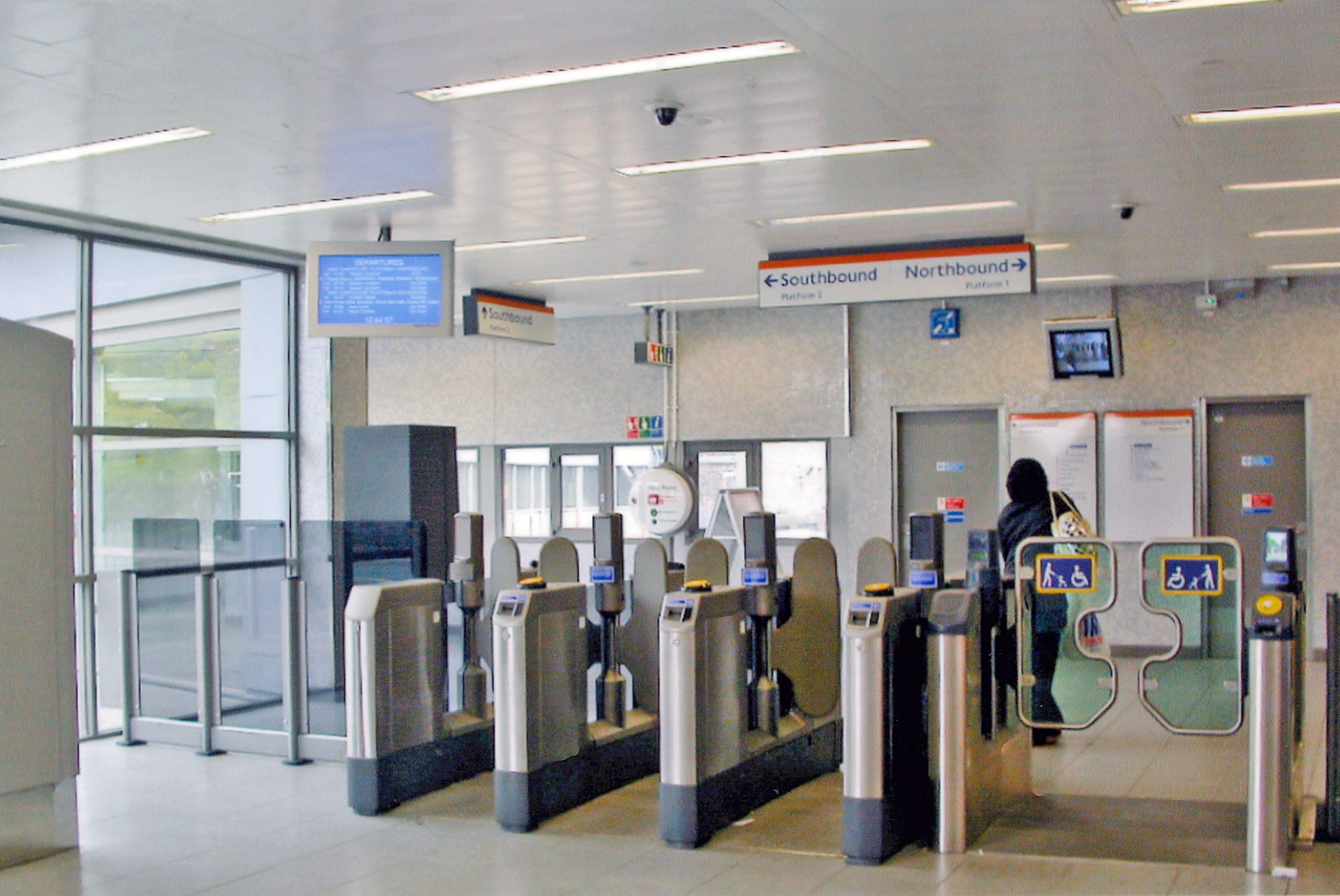
Electronic ticket barriers at Surrey Quays Station

Ticketing is a mix of paper, Oyster cards, electronic smart cards and contactless payment cards for "pay-as-you-go" travel. As with all National Rail and TfL services in London, passengers can use a Travelcard (daily, seven-day, monthly or annual); as on other National Rail services in London, paper single, return and cheap day return tickets priced under the zonal fare scheme are also available.

As part of an effort to improve safety and protect revenue, TfL has announced that it will introduce ticket barriers at a number of stations. The stations that did not have barriers when TfL took over have been fitted with standalone Oyster card readers similar to those at ungated Underground and DLR stations. The validators at Blackhorse Road which were needed to enter/exit the Oyster card system when changing to and from the Victoria line were replaced with route validators, coloured pink: these are used to show that a traveller using Oyster PAYG changed lines at that station, showing which of the possible routes was used. Typically, this avoids paying for zone 1 when the passenger did not travel into it.

Ticket stock is common National Rail stock, as Overground services remain part of the National Rail network, but sometimes with a large TfL roundel in the centre and the repeated legend "Rail Settlement Plan" or on newer versions "National Rail" on a light green background. This ticket stock, coded "TFL" on the reverse, was introduced in November 2007.

=== Ticket pricing ===
Oyster PAYG is charged on the same zone-based rules as for the Underground and the Docklands Light Railway. Stations outside Greater London (except Watford Junction) are included in the new London fare zones 7-9. On 2 January 2008 Acton Central was moved from zone 2 to 3, Hampstead Heath from 3 to 2 and Willesden Junction from 3 to both 2 and 3.

Paper tickets are charged on the same zone-based rules as for Underground and DLR paper tickets, which were expanded to take in the extra zones covered. Watford Junction has its own fare scale. Paper tickets are significantly more expensive than using Oyster PAYG.

=== Performance ===
Although a TfL service, the Overground is part of the National Rail network, unlike the Underground. The most recent figures released by Network Rail (NR), for period 7 (2013–2014), showed that it had achieved 96.6% of the Public Performance Measure (PPM) target for punctuality and reliability set by the ORR – down 0.9 percentage points on the period last year. The moving annual average (MAA) of the PPM for the 12 months to 12 October 2013 was 96.5%. TfL, in conjunction with the Massachusetts Institute of Technology, has investigated the use of data from the Oyster smartcard ticketing system to measure the performance of the Overground explicitly from the passenger perspective.

In the autumn 2011 National Passenger Survey, conducted by Passenger Focus, London Overground received an overall satisfaction rating of 92%, a 7% improvement on the previous survey. However, a survey in February 2014 by the consumer group Which? found that customer satisfaction of London Overground was at sixth place (out of 20 train operators) with a satisfaction percentage of 58%.

== Branding ==
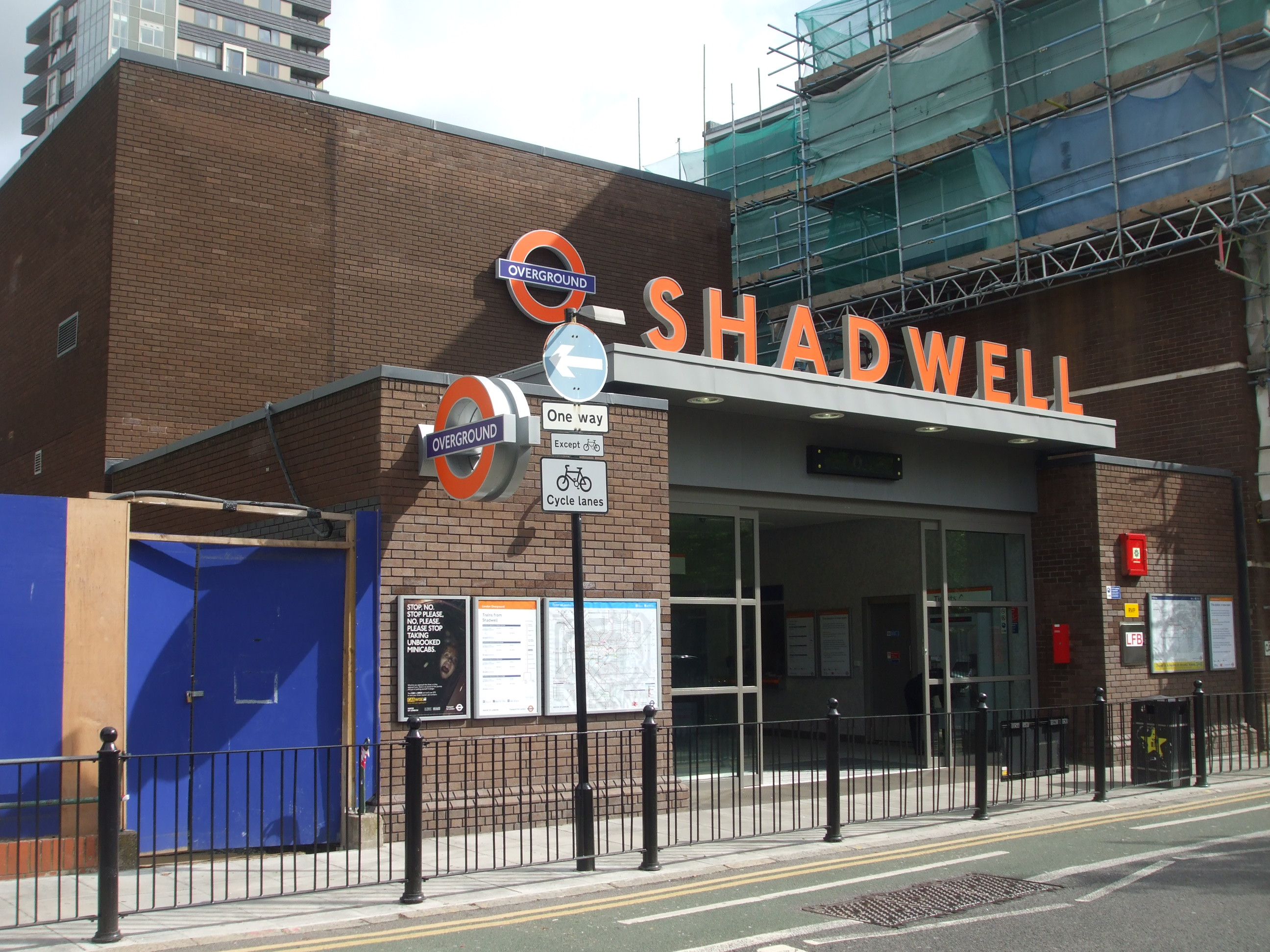
The London Overground roundel and 3D lettering at Shadwell station

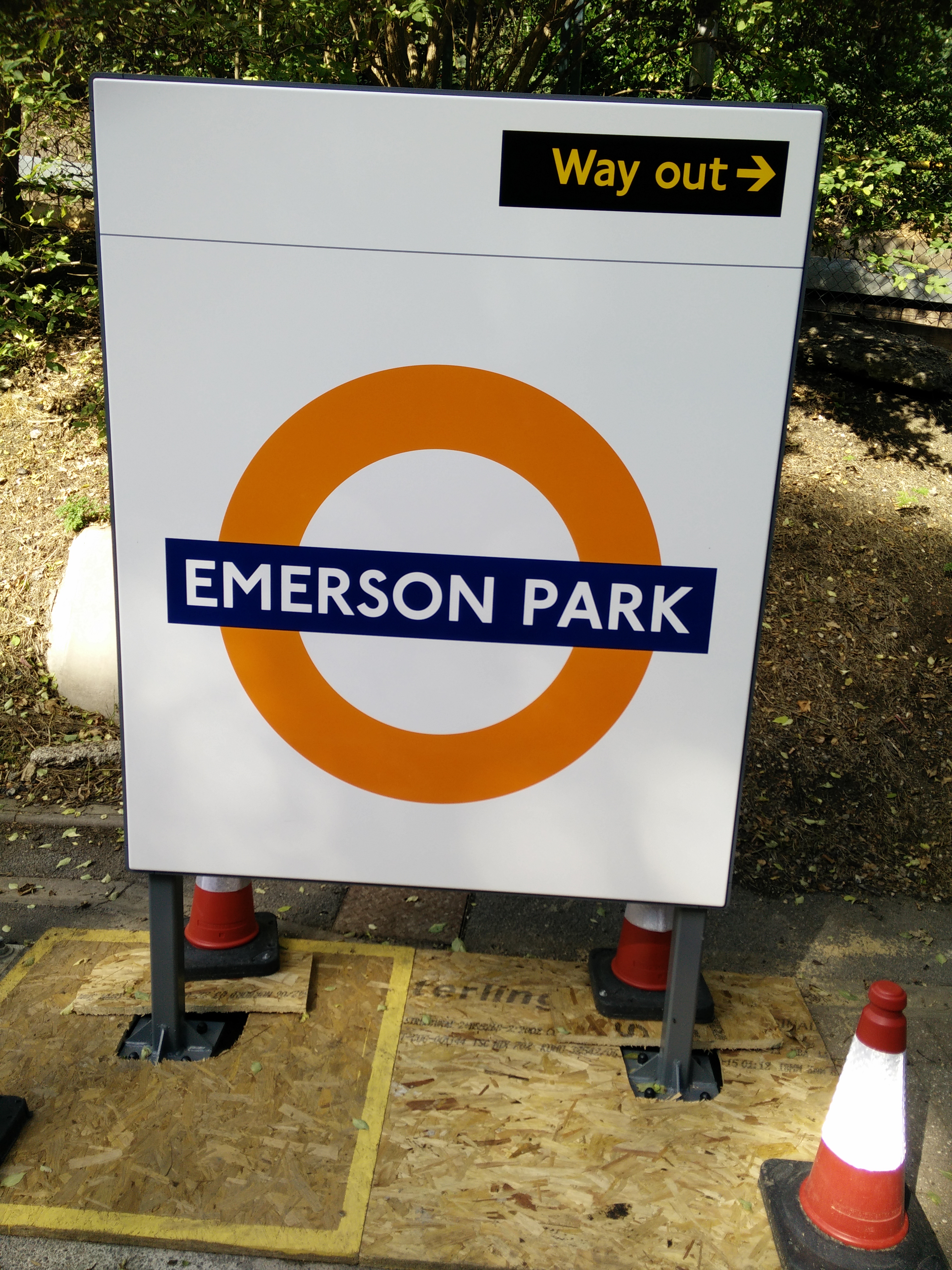
Signage at Emerson Park station

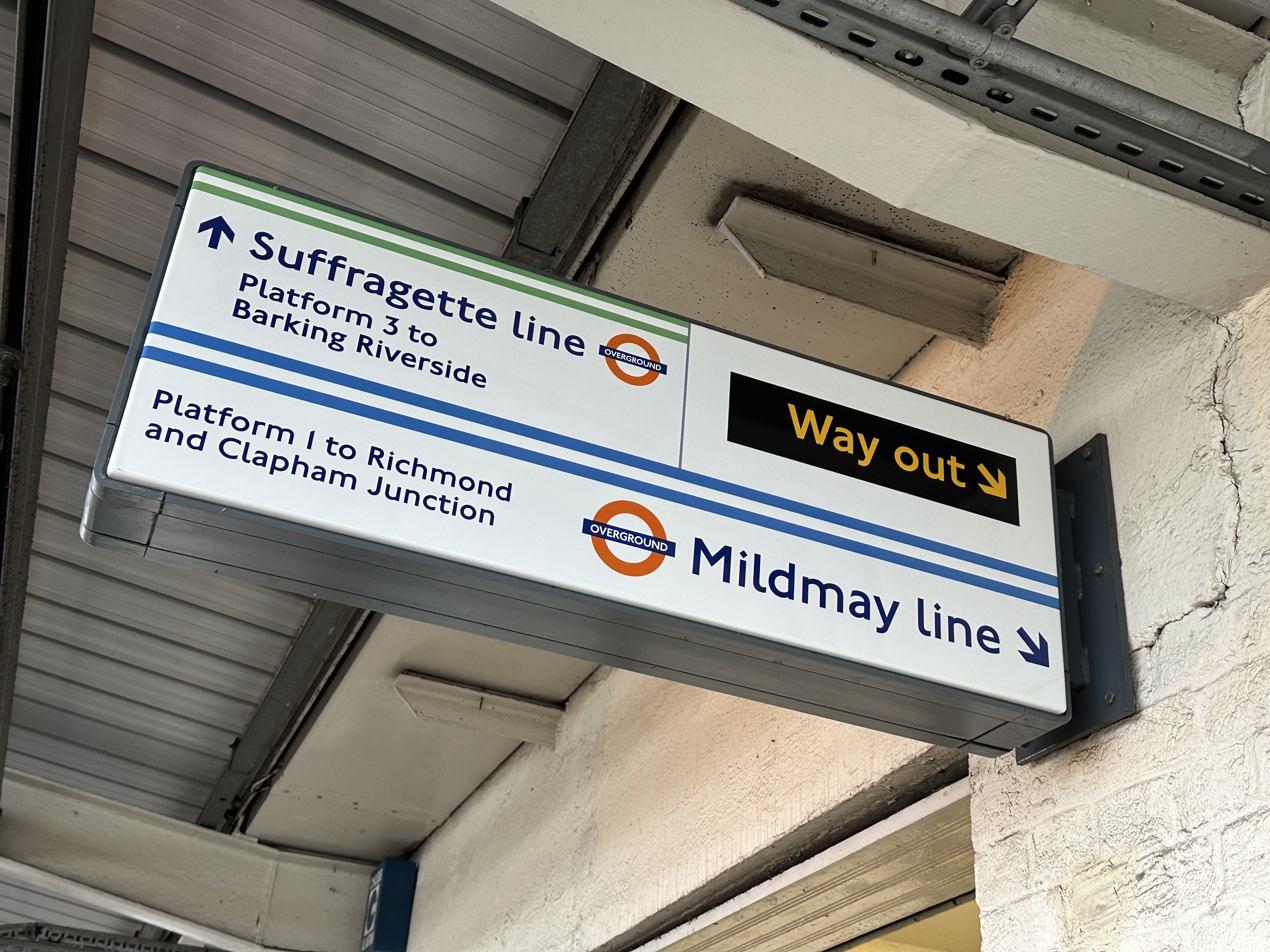
New sign with rebranded line names

Public presentation is visually associated with TfL design standards, using similar graphic design elements to those used on the Underground. These design standards have been applied to London Overground stations, signage, rolling stock and publicity. London Overground also uses the TfL corporate typeface, New Johnston, on its signage, publicity, and stationery and on its fleet of trains. Overground signage is in a vivid orange shade (Pantone 158C). The orange colour was inherited from the former East London line prior to its transfer from Underground to Overground.

Before 2024, London Overground lines tube map did not use colours to distinguish between the different Overground lines. Like the Docklands Light Railway and the Elizabeth line, the Overground is represented by a double line rather than a solid single line, to distinguish it from the colour-coded Underground lines. The London Overground also uses a variant of the TfL roundel. TfL denotes its different transport modes such as London Underground and London Buses with variants of the roundel device using a range of colours, and the London Overground version consists of an orange ring with a blue bar. The roundel has its origins in a 1933 design by the London Passenger Transport Board and has spawned many variations.

Unlike other National Rail stations, London Overground stations which are not served by another National Rail operator now omit the red National Rail "double arrow" logo from signage outside the stations, using only the Overground roundel instead. A few refurbished or new stations on the reopened East London line display the station name in large orange three-dimensional uppercase letters.

=== Line names ===
Before 2024 the Overground lines were also not officially distinguished by individual names, unlike the Underground. To provide more clarity to the London Overground network, making it easier for passengers to navigate their way around the system, it was decided to give each route its own name and colour on maps, signage and in digital information. Mayor of London Sadiq Khan pledged in April 2022 that he would invite Londoners to suggest new Overground lines individual names to reflect their "diverse history". In August 2023, an initial consultation was announced to invite public suggestions for names, so that a shortlist could be established.

In February 2024, TfL announced names for each of London Overground's routes, intended to celebrate London's diverse history and communities. The new names took effect in November 2024, when they mayor officially unveiled the £6.3 million rebranding in a ceremony at Dalston Junction station.

Name	Indicated by	Route	Reason for name
Lioness line	(yellow parallel lines)	Euston to Watford, including Wembley Central	Intended to honour the England women's football team, including their win in UEFA Women's Euro 2022 at Wembley Stadium
Mildmay line	(blue parallel lines)	Stratford to Richmond/Clapham Junction	Intended to honour the work of the Mildmay Mission Hospital, a charitable HIV hospital located in Shoreditch
Windrush line	(red parallel lines)	Highbury & Islington to Clapham Junction/New Cross/Crystal Palace/West Croydon	Intended to honour the Caribbean communities (particularly the "Windrush generation" of 1940s and 1950s arrivals, named after the ship HMT Empire Windrush) that the route runs through
Weaver line	(maroon parallel lines)	Liverpool Street to Cheshunt/Enfield Town/Chingford	Runs through parts of London known for the textile trade, especially the historic area of the Huguenot weavers
Suffragette line	(green parallel lines)	Gospel Oak to Barking Riverside	Barking was the home of the longest-lived women's suffragette, Annie Huggett
Liberty line	(grey parallel lines)	Romford to Upminster	Referencing the Royal Liberty of Havering, and the wider freedom that is a "defining feature of London".

== Passenger numbers ==
Passenger numbers have grown very quickly since the start of London Overground in 2007. There were big increases in 2010/11 and 2011/12 owing to the opening of the extensions of the East London line and South London line. The transfer of some suburban services from Liverpool Street in May 2015 from the Greater Anglia franchise to London Overground also distorted numbers, contributing to a very large growth between 2014/15 and 2015/16.

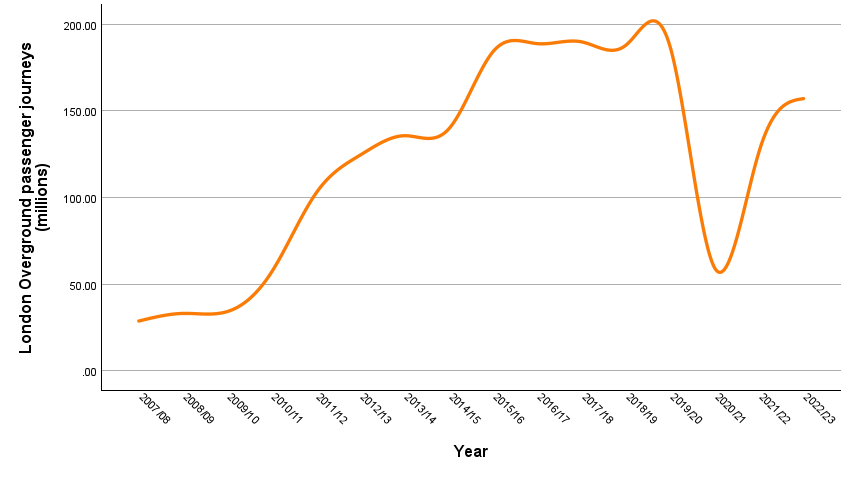
London Overground passenger numbers (millions) 2007/08-2022/23

Annual passenger numbers
Year	Passengers (millions)	% Change
2007–08	28.8	N/A
2008–09	33.2	▲15.3
2009–10	34.3	▲3.3
2010–11	57.2	▲66.8
2011–12	102.6	▲79.4
2012–13	124.6	▲21.4
2013–14	135.7	▲8.9
2014–15	139.8	▲3.0
2015–16	184.4	▲31.9
2016–17	188.8	▲2.4
2017–18	189.8	▲0.9
2018–19	188.1	▼0.8
2019–20	186.0	▼1.1
2020–21	59.2	▼68.2
2021–22	126.9	▲114.3
2022–23	157.1	▲23.7
2023–24	181.4	▲15.5
2024–25	180.4	▼0.6

== Rolling stock ==
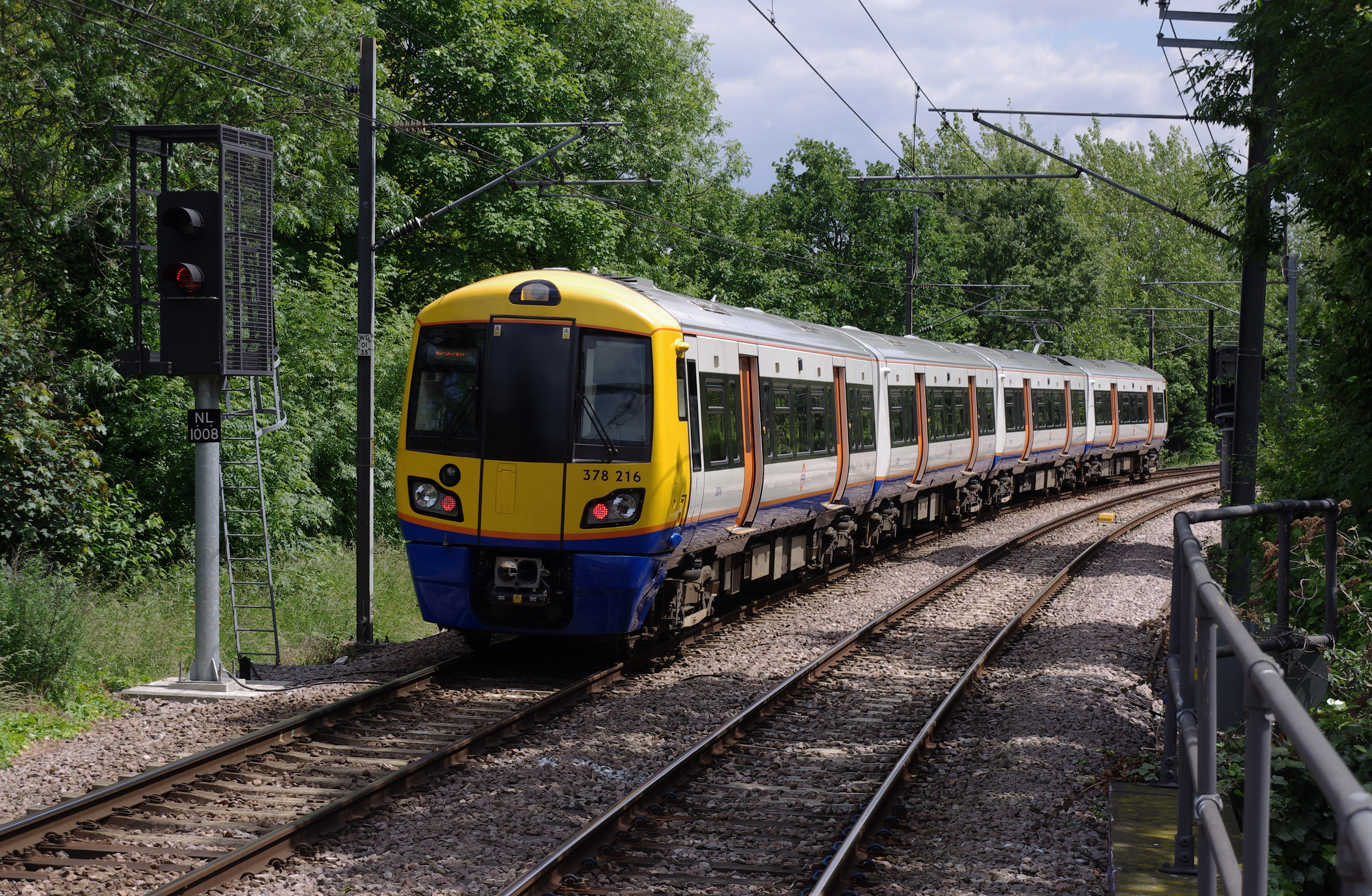
Class 378 Capitalstar unit 378216 departs Gospel Oak with a Mildmay line service to Stratford. Class 313 and Class 508 units were gradually phased out of London Overground services in favour of these units.

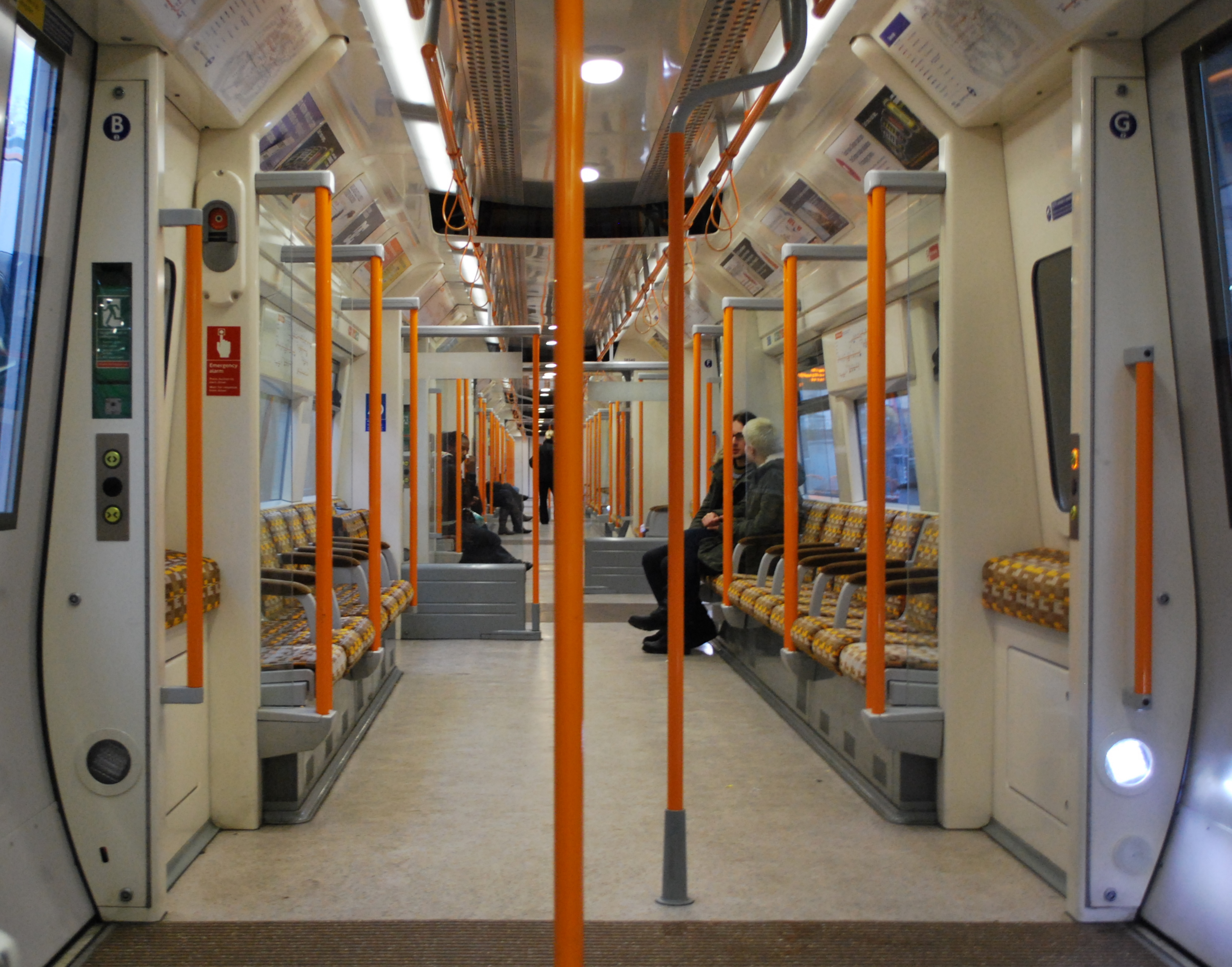
The interior of a Class 378, showing the longitudinal tube-style seating

Since the London Overground took over from Silverlink, TfL has pursued a programme of rolling-stock replacement in order to remove from service the ageing second-generation EMUs and Class 150 DMUs it inherited from Silverlink. In 2009, Class 378 Capitalstar units built by Bombardier's Derby Litchurch Lane Works were introduced on the electrified lines to replace the Class 313 and Class 508 units used previously, while the Class 150s were replaced by new Class 172 Turbostar units on the non-electrified Gospel Oak to Barking line. By October 2010, the new rolling stock had completely replaced the units previously operated by Silverlink. The Class 313 and 150s were cascaded to other train operating companies Southern, First Capital Connect and First Great Western. The Class 508 units were stored at Eastleigh Works but were subsequently scrapped in 2013 after being deemed unfit.

Before its closure to become part of the London Overground, services on the East London line were operated with London Underground A60 and A62 Stock.

The Class 378 trains were officially unveiled at Willesden Junction on 13 July 2009. They include a number of tube-style features, including longitudinal seating and increased standing room to provide a high-capacity metro service. They also benefit from walk-through carriage interiors and air conditioning. The North London line has a base fleet of 24 four-car units, Class 378/2. However, these were delivered as three-car units (378/0), with the extended trains being introduced from September 2010, following platform extension works and delivery of the first 20 four-car units (378/1) for the East London line. A further 13 dual-voltage units were delivered to expand services, taking the total fleet to 57 four-car units. These trains were extended to five-car sets towards the end of 2014, starting with the East London line sets.

The trains are leased from newly formed rolling stock company (ROSCO) QW Rail Leasing until 2027. TfL planned initially to buy the new fleet outright, but in February 2008 announced that it would lease the trains in order to free up the £250 million capital cost of purchase, combined with reducing the risk of making a loss through any future sell-on of the fleet.

Eight two-car Class 172/0 units, leased from Angel Trains, entered service in 2010. At first their speed was restricted to 40 mph (64 km/h) but the restriction was lifted when a test was found to be flawed.

TfL invited expressions of interest for a total of 39 four-car EMUs in April 2014, with 30 required for the Lea Valley lines, eight for the Gospel Oak to Barking line, and one for the Romford–Upminster line – all to replace older Class 172, Class 315 and Class 317 trains. Since then the planned procurement was increased to 45 four-car EMUs, with the additional six units intended for the Watford DC line. In July 2015, TfL announced that it had placed a £260M order for 45 four-car Bombardier Aventra EMUs, with an option for 24 more, for use on the Lea Valley lines and the Watford DC line, Gospel Oak to Barking line and Romford–Upminster line from 2018. The type will be known as the Class 710 and will be similar to the Class 345 used by Crossrail. Nine further units were ordered in February 2018, split between an additional three Class 710/2 units for use on the extended Gospel Oak to Barking line, and six 5-car units to allow Class 378 units to be cascaded to strengthened East London line services.

On 22 May 2019, TfL announced that approval had been gained for the Class 710s to enter passenger service. The first two units entered service on the Gospel Oak to Barking line on Thursday 23 May 2019 and the remaining six were in service by August 2019, with the first unit entering service on the Watford DC line on 9 September 2019. The first units on the Lea Valley lines entered service on 3 March 2020 after a first attempt on 24 February 2020. Their use on Romford–Upminster line services began in October 2020.

=== Current fleet ===
Family	Class	Image	Type	Top speed		Number	Coaches	Years built
Family	Class	Image	Type	mph	km/h	Number	Coaches	Years built
Bombardier Electrostar	378 Capitalstar		EMU	75	120	57	5	2008–2011
Bombardier Aventra	710 Aventra		EMU	75	120	48	4	2017–2020
Bombardier Aventra	710 Aventra		EMU	75	120	6	5	2020

=== Past fleet ===
Former train types operated by London Overground include:

Family	Class	Image	Type	Top speed		Number	Coaches	Routes operated	Years built	Years operated
Family	Class	Image	Type	mph	km/h	Number	Coaches	Routes operated	Years built	Years operated
Sprinter	150/1		DMU	75	120	6	2	Gospel Oak to Barking line	1984–1987	2007–2010
Bombardier Turbostar	172/0		DMU	100	160	8	2	Gospel Oak to Barking line	2010	2010–2019
BREL 1972	313/1		EMU	75	120	23	3	North London line; Watford DC line; West London line	1976–1977	2007–2010
BREL 1972	315		EMU	75	120	17	4	Lea Valley lines; Romford–Upminster line	1980–1981	2015–2020
BR Second Generation (Mark 3)	317/7		EMU	100	161	8	4	Lea Valley lines	1981–1982	2015–2020
BR Second Generation (Mark 3)	317/8		EMU	100	161	6	4	Lea Valley lines	1981–1982	2015–2020
BR Second Generation (Mark 3)	321/4		EMU	100	161	2	4	Romford–Upminster line	1988–1990	2015–2016
BREL 1972	508/3		EMU	75	120	3	3	Watford DC line	1979–1980	2007–2010

=== Livery ===
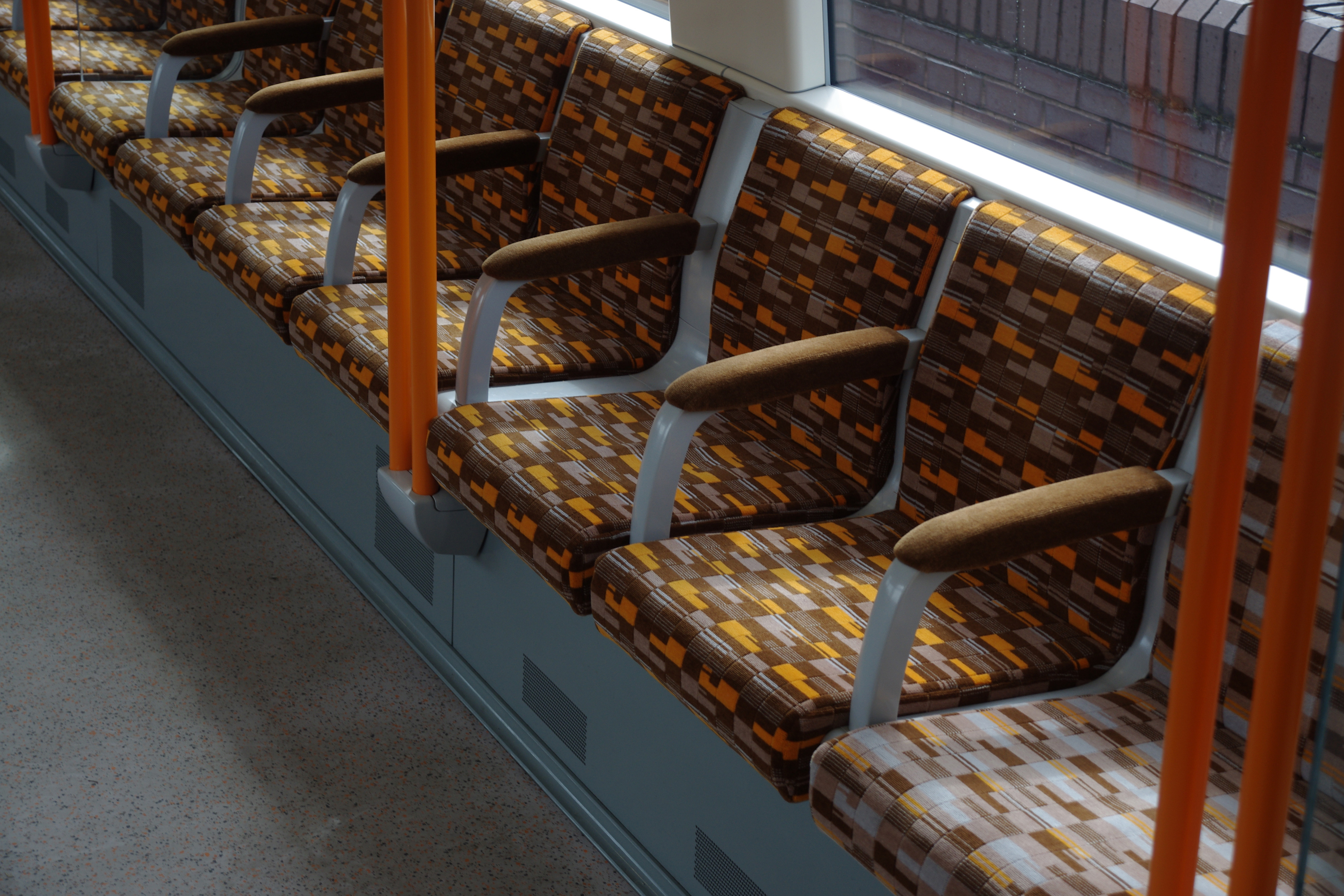
Wallace Sewell moquette upholstery

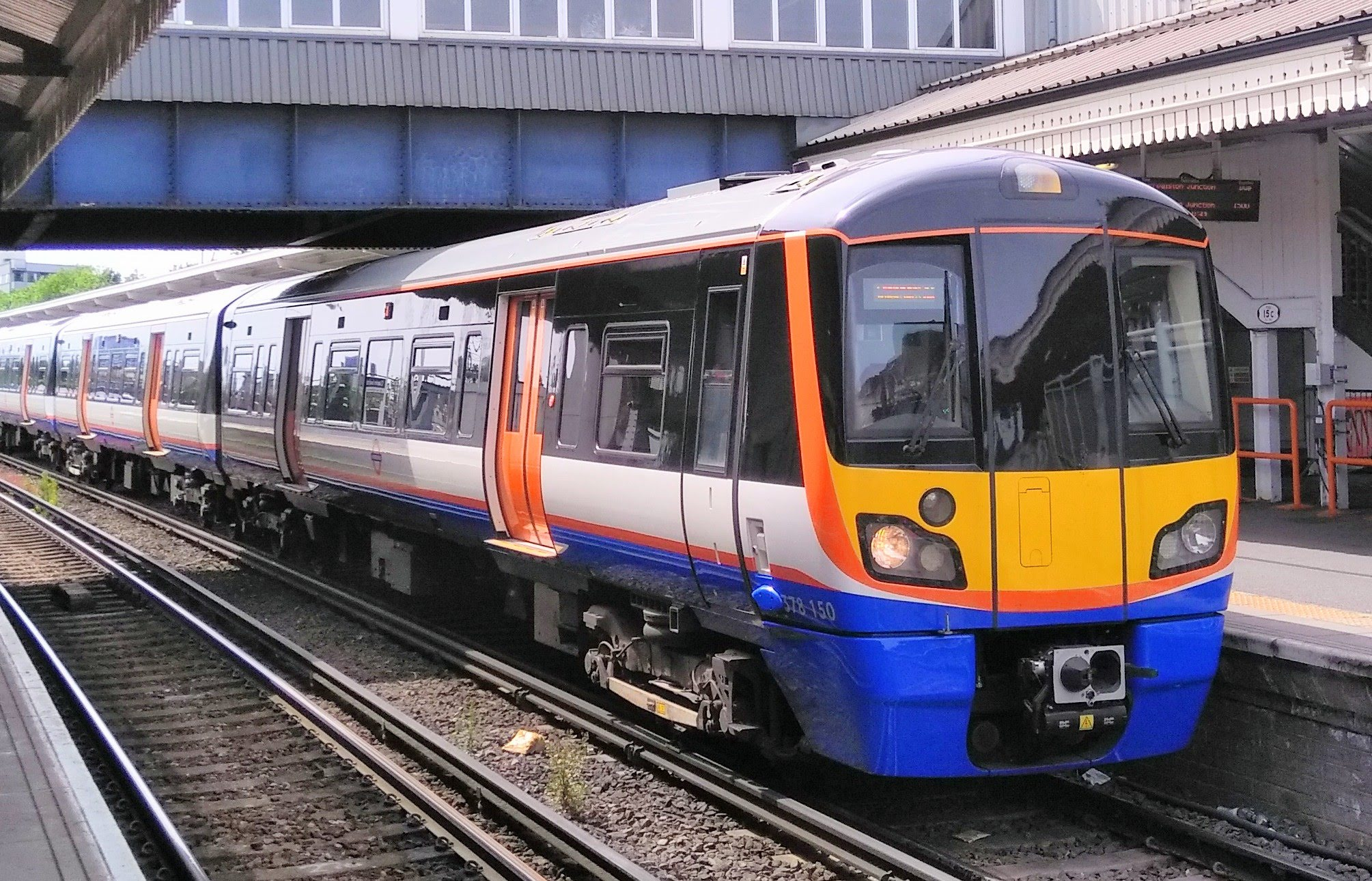
Class 378 in revised London Overground livery

All Capitalstar and Aventra stock in service now carries Overground livery. It is similar to Underground livery, and consists of white and black coaches, a longitudinal thick blue stripe and a thin orange stripe along the bottom, London Overground roundels at midpoints along the coaches, black window-surrounds and orange doors. The ends of each Class 378 unit are painted yellow to comply with the National Rail standards that existed when the first wave of new trains began to enter service in 2009. However, Class 710 units do not have this as they were introduced into service after new standards released by the RSSB since most trains now have European-styled headlights allowing for better visibility from afar, unlike before when they needed the yellow fronts for visibility. The seat upholstery features a moquette by fabric designers Wallace Sewell.

As railway lines have been transferred to London Overground operation, services are sometimes operated using rolling stock inherited from the previous train operating company, and for a temporary period these trains have been branded with transitional livery until they are replaced with newer rolling stock. When the first London Overground services began, they were operated using Silverlink rolling stock which retained Silverlink's purple and lime green livery with yellow doors. The Silverlink logos were removed and Overground banners were added. This rolling stock was eventually completely replaced with new, Overground-branded trains.

Similarly, since the takeover of the Lea Valley lines, Overground services are being run with trains inherited from Abellio Greater Anglia which are mostly in a plain white livery with red doors. Prior to replacement of this rolling stock, the trains were repainted with full Overground livery and the interiors refurbished with Wallace Sewell upholstery and TfL standard signage and route maps.

In June 2018, London Overground unveiled its first complete Class 710 unit, complete with a newly designed livery and moquette. In October, it then began a programme to refresh the Class 378 fleet, giving them a livery designed to appear similar to the one designed for the Class 710.

== Proposed developments ==
=== Watford DC line move to Bakerloo ===
In 2007, TfL proposed re-extending the Bakerloo line to Watford Junction. It was suggested that most or all of the line from Queen's Park to Watford Junction would be used exclusively by the London Underground; London Overground services would be withdrawn.

As part of this change, Overground services would have been diverted at Primrose Hill Junction via Primrose Hill (closed to passengers since 1992) to Camden Road, providing a new service between Queen's Park and Stratford. Had this change taken place, Kilburn High Road and South Hampstead would no longer have had direct services to Euston station, hindering access to central London.

The official Croxley Rail document states, "Bakerloo Line extension to Watford Unlikely" and "TfL’s plans to extend the Bakerloo Line to Watford Junction are on hold indefinitely due to funding and business case constraints".

=== Old Oak Common interchange ===
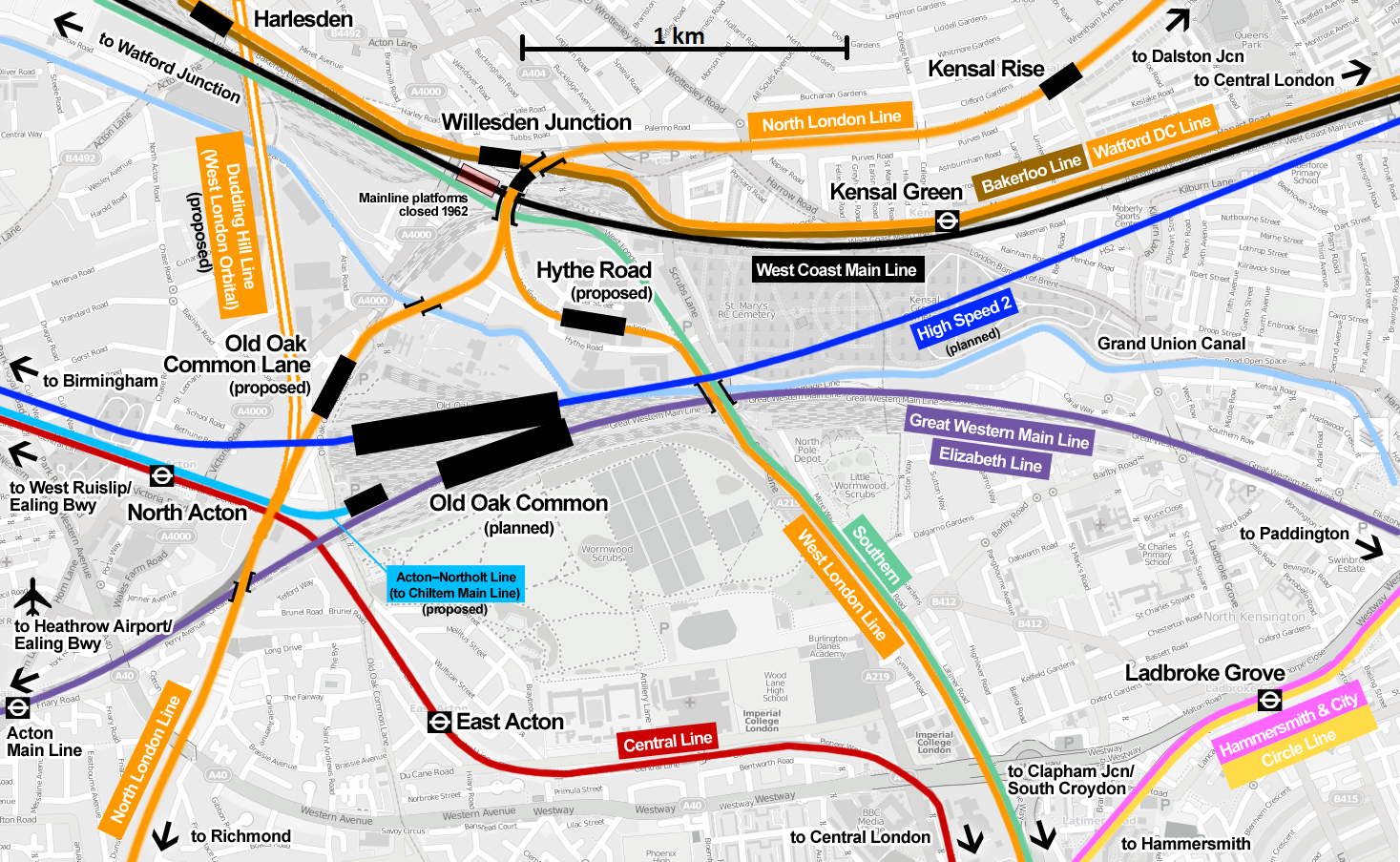
Map of the proposed Old Oak Common interchange

A long-term plan exists to create an interchange with High Speed 2 at the proposed Old Oak Common station. Planning documents issued by the DfT suggest that the new station, on a site just south of Willesden Junction, could open by 2025 and offer connections with the Overground on both the Lioness and Mildmay lines.

The station would also be served by the Elizabeth line, Great Western Main Line services and the proposals indicate the possibility of interchange with the Bakerloo and Central lines. The plans are supported by the London Borough of Hammersmith and Fulham.

In June 2013, the Mayor of London and the London Boroughs of Brent, Ealing and Hammersmith & Fulham released 'vision' consultation documents about the Old Oak Common area. These documents mention various connections to the London Overground system, linking Old Oak to the North London line, West London line, and to two new London Overground branches, to Hounslow, and – via the Dudding Hill line – to Thameslink stations on the Midland Main Line.

In October 2017, TfL began a public consultation on the construction of two new Overground stations, Hythe Road on the West London line and Old Oak Common Lane on the North London line. If built, these stations would provide interchange between London Overground and Old Oak Common station.

=== Thamesmead extension ===
In addition to the extension of the Gospel Oak to Barking line to Barking Riverside, there are also proposals to extend it further under the River Thames to a station in Thamesmead, and then on Abbey Wood to connect with the Elizabeth line.

Transport for London has confirmed that the Mayor has asked them to look at both the Overground extension from Barking Riverside and a DLR extension, for connecting to Thamesmead.

In February 2024, a public consultation began on a DLR extension to Thamesmead from Gallions Reach, which had been favoured over the previous London Overground proposal due to cost and service frequency.

=== Great Northern inners takeover ===
On 20 September 2025, TfL submitted an outline business case to take over Great Northern services from Moorgate to Welwyn Garden City, Hertford North, and Stevenage and integrate it into the London Overground network. TfL wants to increase the number of trains from two trains per hour to four trains per hour, standardise fares across the route, serve a 21,000 home development at Crews Hill, and boost growth in North London and Hertfordshire. The takeover could occur in autumn 2027, after Govia Thameslink Railway's contract ends, if approval is given by DfT; however, the Overground services would use the existing Class 717 stock.

=== West London Orbital ===
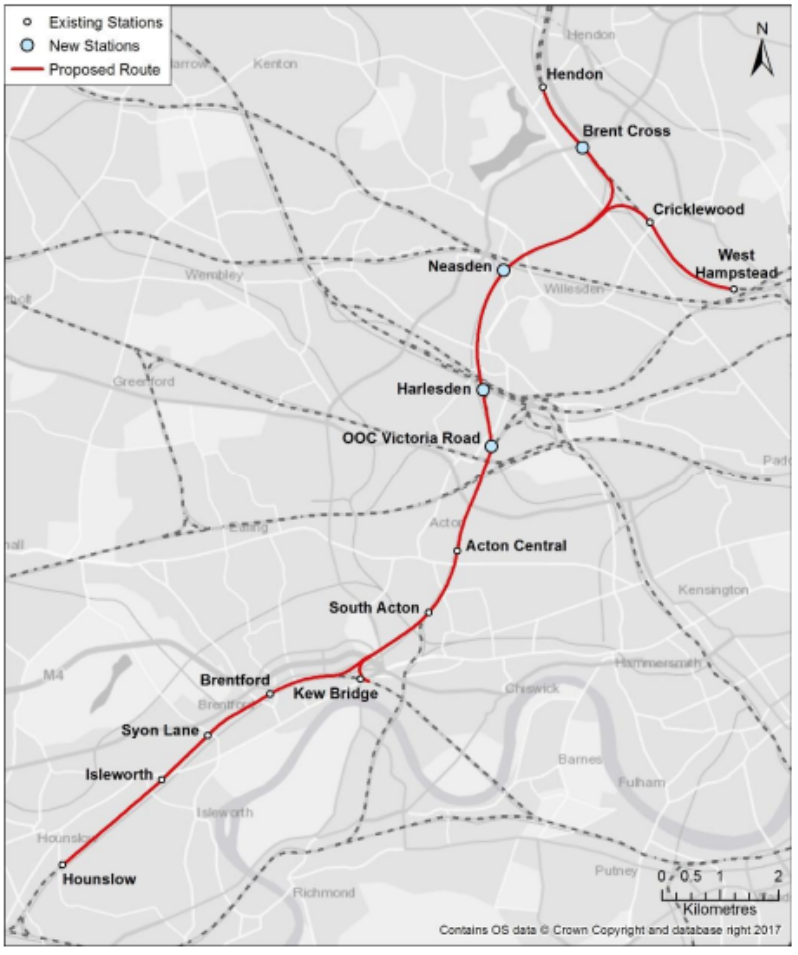
Map of the proposed West London Orbital

Proposals to reopen the Dudding Hill line to passenger services as part of the London Overground have been mooted for several years. In June 2019, TfL published a report examining the possibility of opening the line as a London Overground branch line connecting Hounslow with Hendon and Cricklewood, with stations at Harlesden, Lionel Road, Old Oak Common Lane, Neasden and Brent Cross West.

== Crowd information ==
In 2017 it was reported that a system is being trialled at Shoreditch High Street station that indicates the crowding in each train carriage. The technology, already in use on Thameslink trains, helps passengers find the least crowded carriage when boarding a train and should reduce dwell times at stations. If the trial is successful, it will be rolled out across the London Overground network.

== See also ==
- East London Transit
- Urban rail in the United Kingdom
