= Arriva Rail London =

British train operating company

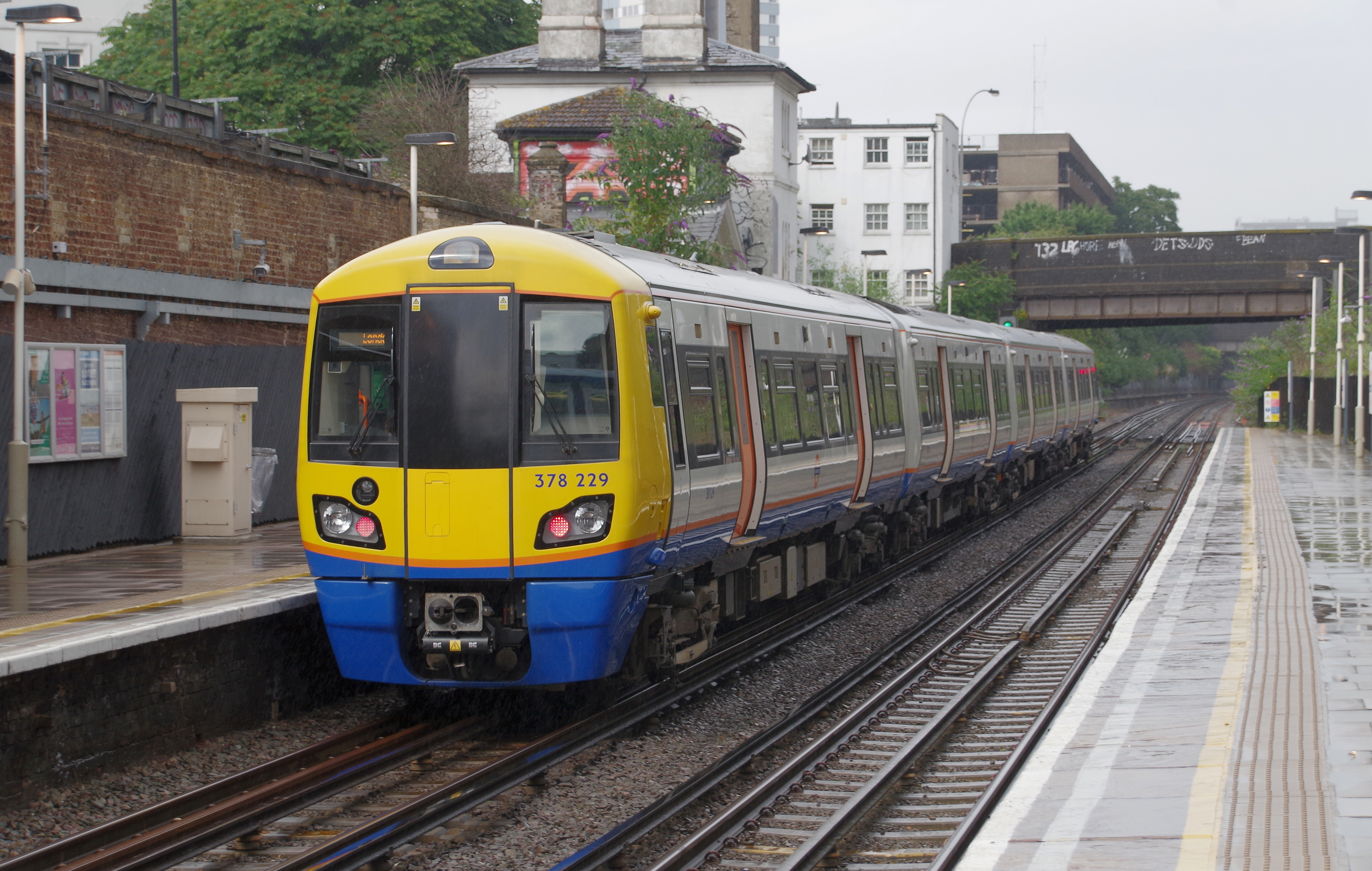
- Class 378 Capitalstar at Kilburn High Road in 2014

Overview
- Concessions: London Overground; 13 November 2016 – 2 May 2026
- Main region: Greater London
- Parent company: Arriva UK Trains
- Successor: First Rail London

Other
- Website: www.arrivaraillondon.co.uk

Arriva Rail London was a British train operating company owned by Arriva UK Trains that operated the London Overground concession on behalf of Transport for London until May 2026.

== History ==
In April 2015, Transport for London (TfL) placed a notice in the Official Journal of the European Union, inviting expressions of interest in operating the next concession. In July 2015, Transport for London announced the shortlisted bidders for the next concession were Arriva UK Trains, ComfortDelGro, Govia and MTR Corporation.

In March 2016, Arriva was awarded a seven-and-a-half-year concession with an option to extend for a further two years. Operations commenced on 13 November 2016. Arriva held a 50% shareholding in the previous concession holder, London Overground Rail Operations.

In June 2023, Arriva Rail London were granted a two-year contract extension, pushing the contract's expiry date to May 2026. The new contract came into effect upon expiry of the old contract in May 2024.

In November 2024, TfL invited expressions of interest in operating the next concession. In March 2025, four bidders were shortlisted. In December 2025, TfL announced First Rail London had won the contract to operate the London Overground concession, starting from 3 May 2026.

== Rolling stock ==
Arriva Rail London inherited a fleet of Class 172, Class 315, Class 317 and Class 378s. From 2019, the first of 54 Class 710s were delivered. These replaced the Class 172, Class 315 and Class 317s, and the Class 378s on Watford DC line duties, allowing them to be concentrated on North London line, East London line, West London line and South London line services.

On 22 May 2019 TfL announced that approval had been gained for the Class 710s to enter passenger service. The first two units entered service on the Gospel Oak to Barking Line on Thursday 23 May 2019 and the remaining six were in service by August 2019, with the first unit entering service on the Watford DC line on 9 September 2019. The first units on the Lea Valley lines entered service on 3 March 2020 after a first attempt on 24 February 2020. Their use on Romford–Upminster line services began in October 2020.

=== Final fleet ===
Family	Class	Image	Type	Top speed		Number	Train Numbers	Cars	Seat layout	Routes operated	Built
Family	Class	Image	Type	mph	km/h	Number	Train Numbers	Cars	Seat layout	Routes operated	Built
Bombardier Electrostar	378/1 Capitalstar		EMU	75	120	20	378135–154	5	Longitudinal	East London line South London line	2009–10
Bombardier Electrostar	378/2 Capitalstar		EMU	75	120	37	378201–378234; 378255–378257	5	Longitudinal	North London line West London line East London line South London line Watford DC line	2008–11
Bombardier Aventra	710/1		EMU	75	120	30	710101-130	4	Longitudinal	Lea Valley lines Romford–Upminster line	2017–20
Bombardier Aventra	710/2		EMU	75	120	18	710256-273	4	Longitudinal	Gospel Oak to Barking line Watford DC line	2017–20
Bombardier Aventra	710/3		EMU	75	120	6	710374-379	5	Longitudinal	Watford DC line	2020

=== Past fleet ===
Former train types operated by Arriva Rail London include:

Family	Class	Image	Type	Top speed		Number	Carriages	Routes operated	Years built	Years operated
Family	Class	Image	Type	mph	km/h	Number	Carriages	Routes operated	Years built	Years operated
Bombardier Turbostar	172/0		DMU	100	160	8	2	Gospel Oak to Barking line	2010	2010–19
BREL 1972	315		EMU	75	120	17	4	Lea Valley lines Romford–Upminster line	1980–81	2015–2020
BR Second Generation (Mark 3)	Class 317/7		EMU	100	161	8	4	Lea Valley lines	1981–82	2015–2020
BR Second Generation (Mark 3)	Class 317/8		EMU	100	161	6	4	Lea Valley lines	1981–82	2015–2020

== Depots ==
Arriva Rail London's fleet is maintained at Ilford, New Cross Gate and Willesden depots.

Preceded by London Overground Rail Operations	Operator of London Overground concession 2016–2026	Succeeded by First Rail London
