= First Rail London =

Operator of the London Overground

Overview
- Concessions: London Overground; 3 May 2026
- Main region: London
- Parent company: FirstGroup
- Reporting mark: LO

Other
- Website: www.firstraillondon.co.uk

First Rail London is a British train operating company owned by FirstGroup that operates the London Overground concession.

== History ==
Transport for London shortlisted Arriva, FirstGroup, Go-Ahead Group and Transport UK Group for the next London Overground contract.

In December 2025, FirstGroup was awarded the contract with First Rail London, and took over the concession from Arriva Rail London on 3 May 2026. The contract runs for eight years, with the option to extend it by two additional years.

== Rolling stock ==
First Rail London inherited a fleet of Class 378 and Class 710 rolling stock.

=== Current fleet ===
Family	Class	Image	Type	Top speed		Number	Train Numbers	Cars	Seat layout	Routes operated	Built
Family	Class	Image	Type	mph	km/h	Number	Train Numbers	Cars	Seat layout	Routes operated	Built
Bombardier Electrostar	378/1 Capitalstar		EMU	75	120	20	378135–154	5	Longitudinal	East London line South London line	2009–10
Bombardier Electrostar	378/2 Capitalstar		EMU	75	120	37	378201–378234; 378255–378257	5	Longitudinal	North London line West London line East London line South London line Watford DC line	2008–11
Bombardier Aventra	710/1		EMU	75	120	30	710101-130	4	Longitudinal	Lea Valley lines Romford–Upminster line	2017–20
Bombardier Aventra	710/2		EMU	75	120	18	710256-273	4	Longitudinal	Gospel Oak to Barking line Watford DC line	2017–20
Bombardier Aventra	710/3		EMU	75	120	6	710374-379	5	Longitudinal	Watford DC line	2020

Preceded by Arriva Rail London	Operator of London Overground concession 2026–present	Incumbent
