= New Cross Gate Depot =

Railway maintenance depot in New Cross, Lewisham

- Interactive map of New Cross Gate Depot

Location
- Location: New Cross, Lewisham
- Coordinates: 51.4814°N 0.0433°W
- OS grid: TQ375834

Characteristics
- Owner: London Overground Bombardier Transportation
- Depot code: NG (1973 -)
- Type: EMU

New Cross Gate Depot is a railway depot in New Cross, South East London. The depot is situated on the London Overground East London Line and is to the north of New Cross Gate station beside the Brighton Main Line. It replaced the smaller New Cross Depot that serviced the predecessor London Underground line.

As of 2017, the depot's allocation consists of London Overground Class 378 EMUs.

== History ==
=== London Underground East London Line ===
Light maintenance and stabling took place at the smaller New Cross depot alongside the South Eastern Main Line on the New Cross branch of the East London line, with heavier work done at Neasden Depot on the Metropolitan line. Between 1985 and 1987, D78 stock operated the line before being replaced by A60 and A62 stock. This depot closed when the line was transferred from London Underground, and was subsequently demolished.

=== 2009/10: Construction ===
The current depot was constructed in 2009 to stable British Rail Class 378 stock for the new London Overground service. Unlike the LUL East London Line New Cross depot, this depot was constructed north of New Cross Gate and beside the Brighton Main Line.

=== 2014/5: Capitalstar 378 conversion to five car units ===
To cope with increased demand, the class 378 units which operate on the line were extended from four to five cars, requiring the depot to be extended by 20 metres (66 ft).
