= Huguenot weavers =

French silk weavers

Huguenot weavers were French silk weavers of the Calvinist faith. They came from major silk-weaving cities in southern France, such as Lyon and Tours. They fled from religious persecution, migrating from mainland Europe to Britain around the time of Revocation of the Edict of Nantes, 1685.

== Migration ==
It is estimated that there were 500,000 Protestants in France in the 1680s, of which 180,000 migrated. 60,000 went to the Dutch republic, 50,000 went to England and 20,000 to Switzerland. Ireland took 10,000 and Denmark 2000 while others left Europe: 3,500 to the Americas and 400 to South Africa.

=== Huguenot weavers in the United Kingdom ===
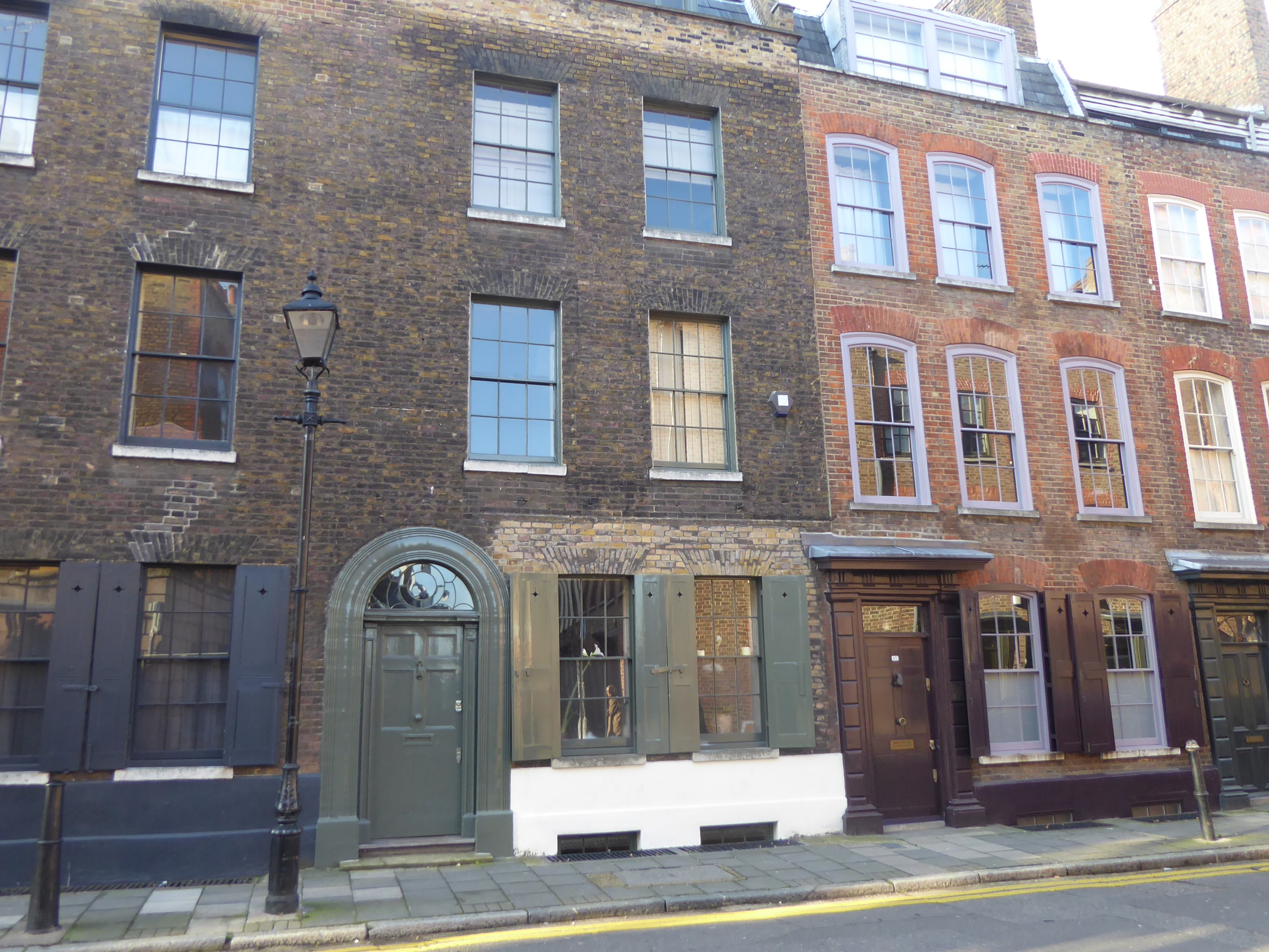
Huguenot weavers lived in these houses in Spitalfields, London.

They settled first in Canterbury; then some 13,050 moved to Spitalfields in London. Their arrival had a major impact on the area economy, and Spitalfields consequently became known as "weaver town". Others moved further, to the silk weaving town of Macclesfield. (Note: In both Spitalfields and Canterbury, French communities were formed. In Spitalfields there was a cluster of 11 Huguenot churches. Their importance lay not in numbers but the important silk weaving skills that they introduced. They were disciplined and skillful workers.) Their arrival challenged the English weavers of cotton, woollen and worsted cloth, who subsequently learned the Huguenots' superior techniques. The influx of silk weavers greatly influenced the fashion tastes of the upper-class English, who began to incorporate more silk into their attire.
