= National Council on Inland Transport =

Pressure group in the United Kingdom

The National Council on Inland Transport was a pressure group in the United Kingdom.

In September 1962, The Road and Rail Crisis memo was submitted to the UK prime minister.

It was incorporated on a permanent basis in October 1962. The chairman was Victor Collins, Baron Stonham. The vice-chairman was Robert Aickman of the Inland Waterways Association. The honorary treasurer was John Connell of the Noise Abatement Society. The honorary secretary was Tom Foley of the Pedestrians' Association for Road Safety.

== Members ==
Inaugural members and supportive organisations included the Association of Welsh Local Authorities, Branch Line Reinvigoration Society, Cyclists' Touring Club, District Councils' Association for Scotland, Friends of the Lake District, Great Central Association, Holiday Fellowship, Hornsey Borough Council Road Safety Committee, Inland Waterways Association, National Association of Parish Councils, National Union of Railwaymen, National Union of Ratepayers' Associations, Noise Abatement Society, Pedestrians' Association for Road Safety, Railway and Public Transport Users' Association, Railway Development Association, Ramblers' Association, Road and Rail Association, Scottish Railway Development Association, Transport Salaried Staffs Association and Youth Hostels Association.
