= Gidea Park Carriage Holding Sidings =

Train stabling point in Gidea Park, Greater London

Gidea Park Carriage Sidings
- Interactive map of Gidea Park Carriage Sidings

Location
- Location: Gidea Park, Greater London
- Coordinates: 51.5855°N 0.2141°E
- OS grid: TQ534897

Characteristics
- Owner: Transport for London
- Type: Electric Multiple Unit

History
- Opened: 1931

Gidea Park Carriage Holding Sidings is a stabling point located in Gidea Park, Greater London, England. The depot is situated on the Great Eastern Main Line and is near Gidea Park station.

== History ==
In 1990, Class 321 EMUs were seen at the depot as well as Class 315s.

== Present ==
In 2018, the sidings were remodelled by Network Rail so that it could be used a stabling point for Elizabeth line Class 315 and Class 345 electric-multiple units.
