= Embanking of the tidal Thames =

Historical process by which the lower River Thames was turned into a tidal canal

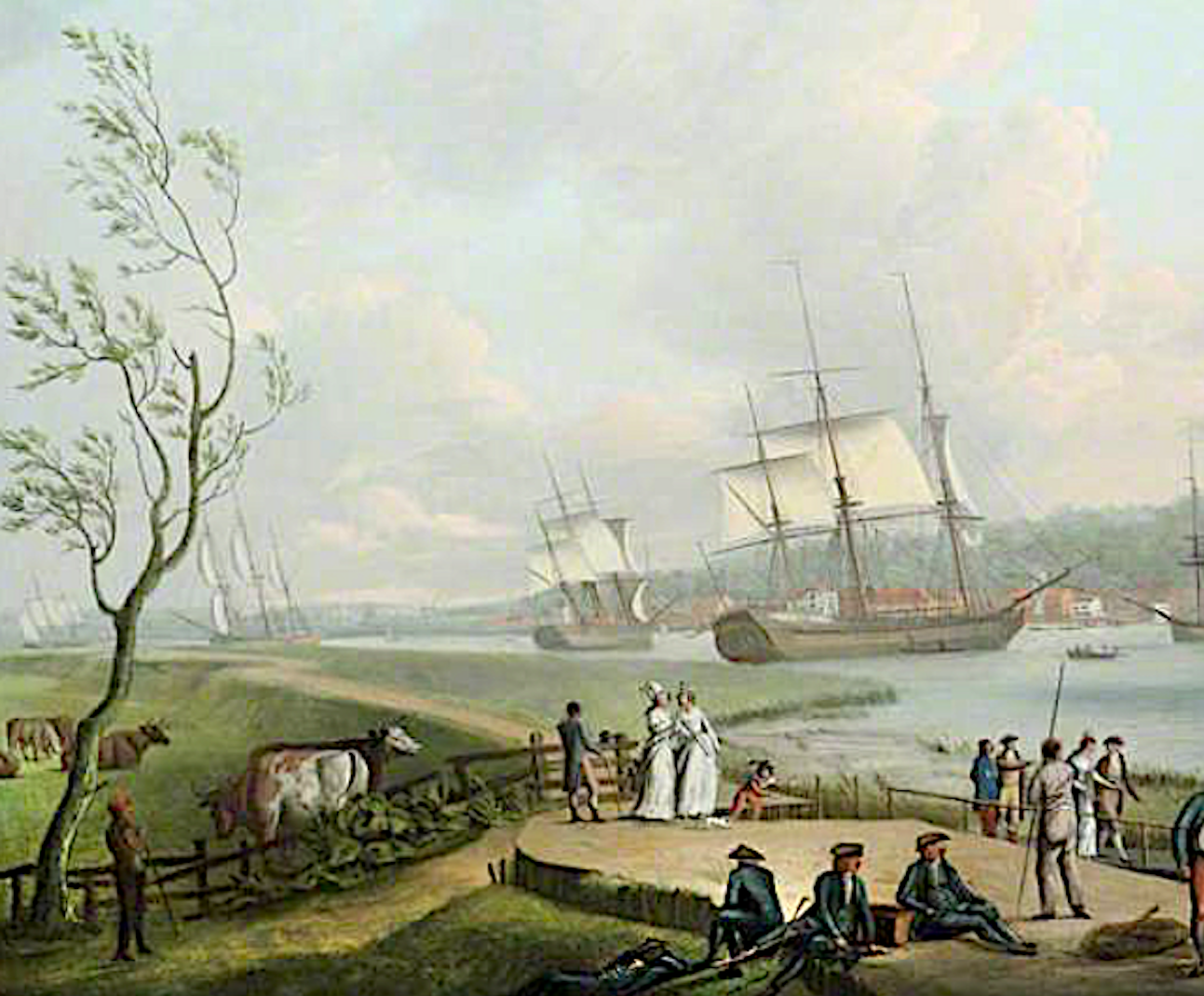
Cattle grazing below high water, Isle of Dogs, 1792 (Robert Dodd, detail: National Maritime Museum)

The embanking of the tidal Thames is the process by which the lower River Thames was transformed by human intervention from a broad and shallow waterway winding through malarious marshlands into a deep, narrow tidal canal flowing between solid artificial walls, and restrained by these at high tide. The Victorian civil engineering works in central London, usually called "the Embankment", are only a small part of this process.

Embanking began in Roman Londinium and was pursued more vigorously in the Middle Ages. It was mostly achieved by farmers reclaiming marshland and building protective embankments, and frontagers pushing out into the stream to get more riverfront property. Currently, over 200 miles of walls line the river's banks from Teddington down to its mouth in the North Sea defending a tidal flood plain where 1.25 million people work and live. Some London streets originated as tracks running along the wall but today are not even in sight of the river.

Since the Thames has a large tidal amplitude, early modern thinkers did not believe local people could have embanked it, so the works were attributed to "the Romans". The current explanation is that tides were small at first, requiring only modest embankments and as the sea has gradually invaded the Thames valley, the embankments have been raised to match in easy stages.

Land reclamation in the Thames had political consequences. It has been argued that it made for independent farmers, contributing to the decay of the feudal system. Other consequences were said to be two clauses in Magna Carta, and one of the declared causes of the English Civil War. The deepening of the Thames also made it navigable by larger ships that could travel further inland which led to London growing to be the world's largest port.

== Before and after the walls ==
=== The natural river ===
At the foundation of Roman Londinium, c. AD 50, the Thames was a river flowing through marshland, possibly five times wider than today. At some point it became infested with mosquitoes carrying malaria.

The original site of Londinium may have been chosen for being the first place where someone travelling up the river would have encountered a broad tract of dry land. This area, mainly gravel, came down to the water on the north bank. The south bank was a wide expanse of marshes and mudflats, largely covered at high tide when the river rose through its tidal range of just over 1 metre (3.3 ft). The first embankation took place during the Roman occupation, when a quayside was built in the London Bridge area (see § City of London).

Below, the river flowed to the sea through broad marshes, rarely touching firm ground. This continued to be the case until the Victorian era, although by that time the river had been restrained at high tides by earthen banks. Much of today's urban London is built on reclaimed marshland.

For millennia humans made use of the ecology of the marshes. They served both as a location for grazing, fishing and fowling, and as a source of raw materials. Reeds and rushes were harvested for thatching and flooring and salt was collected in a seasonal industry on the estuary's outer mudflats.

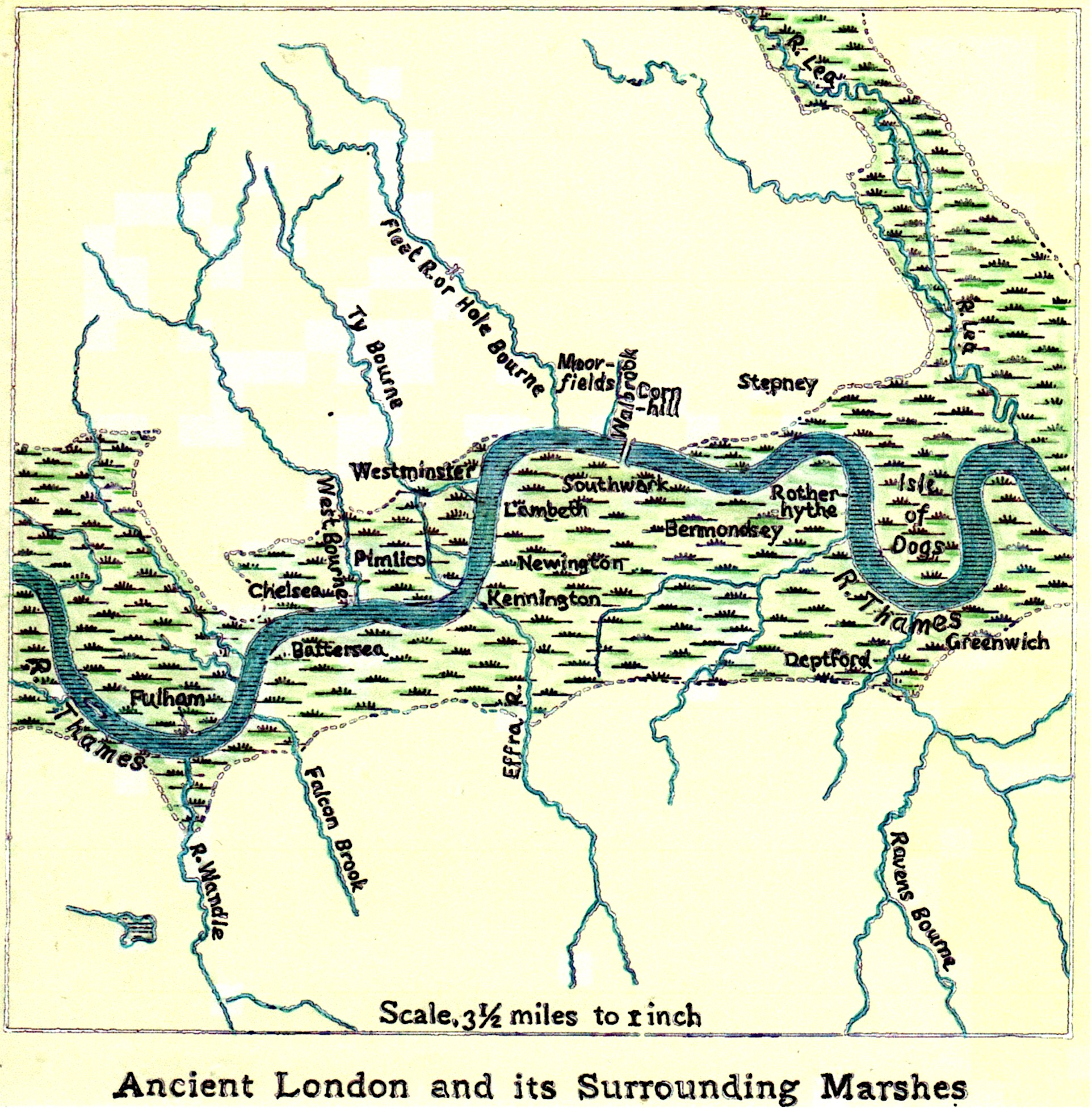
Riverbed centre and modern placenames

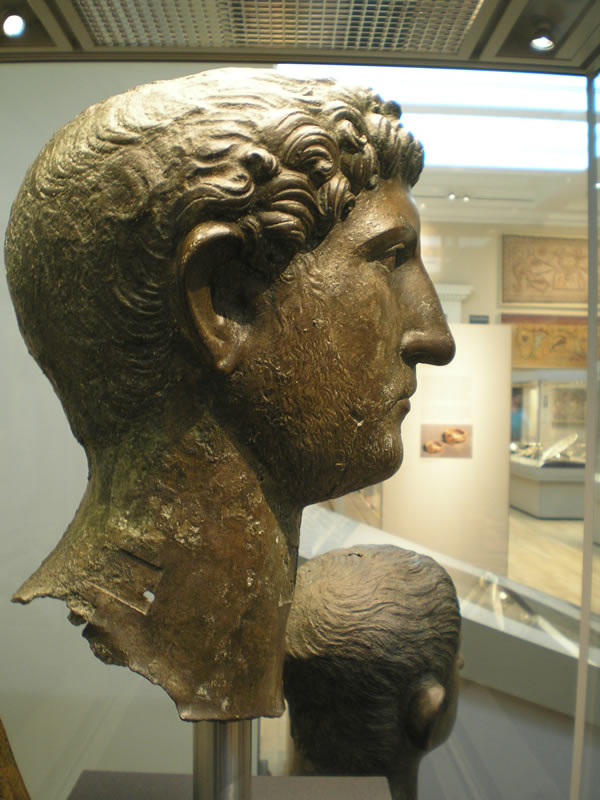
Roman bronze found in Thames

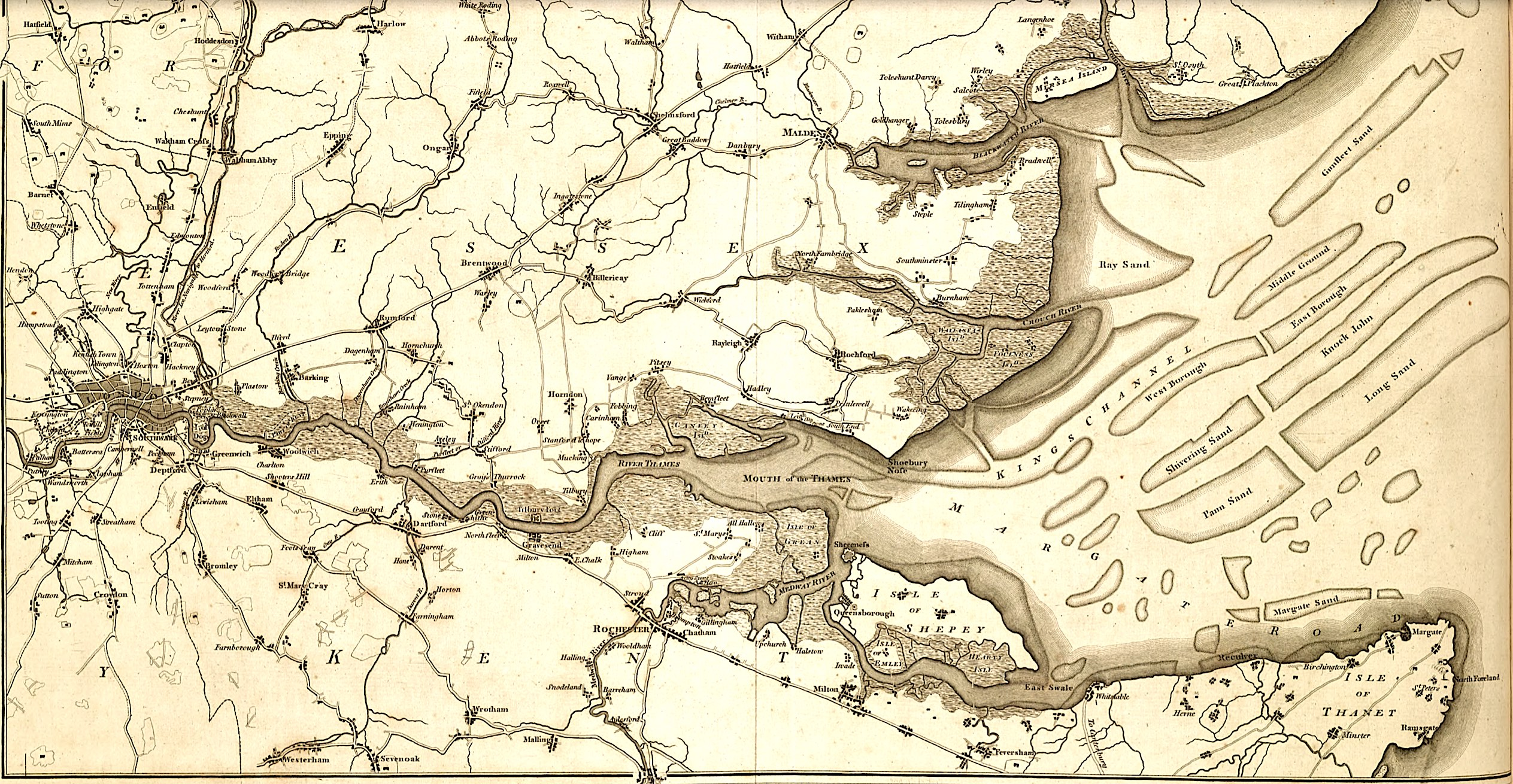
Thames marshland, London to the North Sea, here shown in a late 18th-century map

The flood plain of the Thames was intersected by many small, winding creeks, some of which may have been navigable. The remains of a Roman ship were found on the contemporary site of Guy's Hospital.

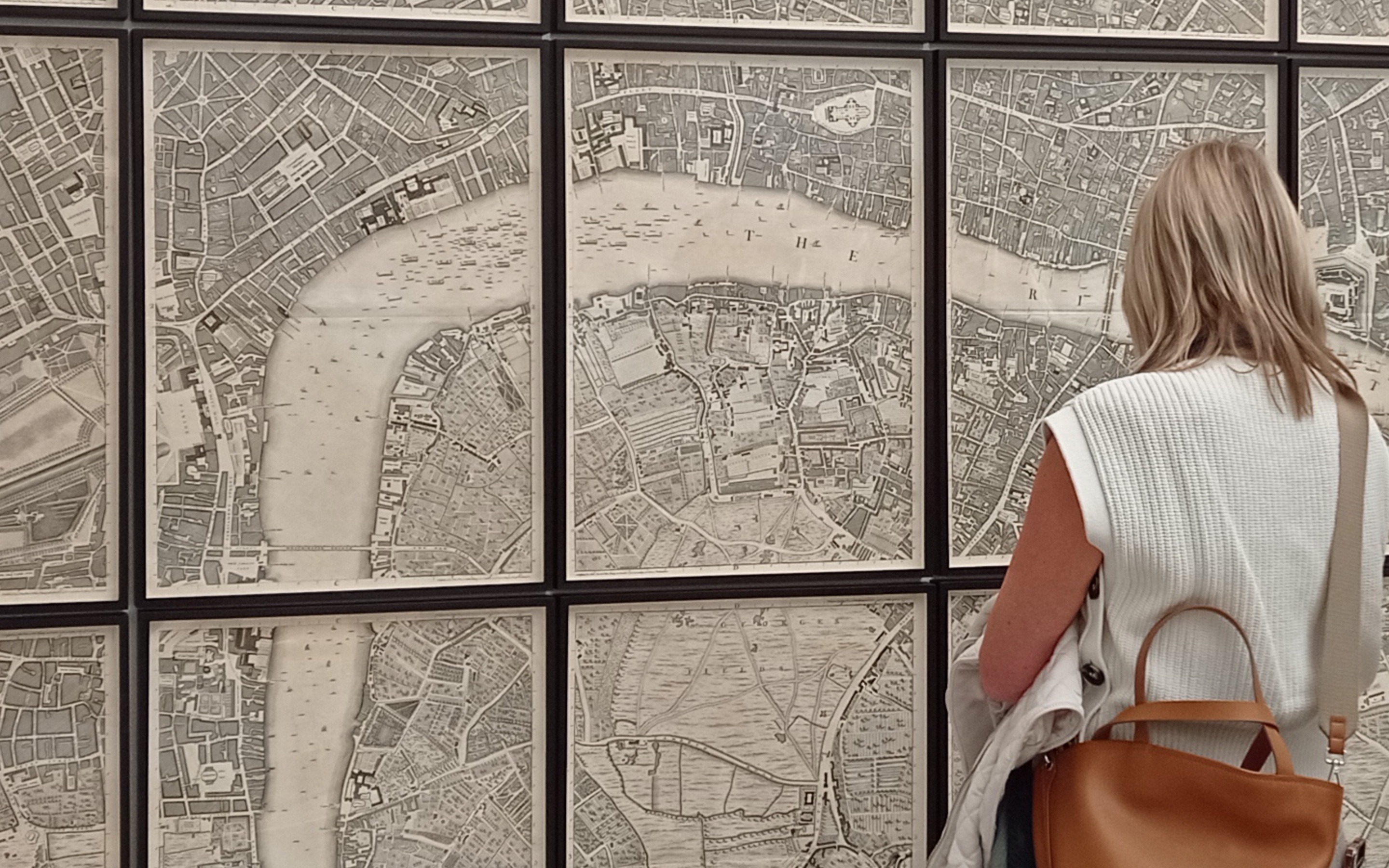
John Rocque's 1746 map, though comparatively recent, depicts a Thames visibly broader than today, with uncontrolled irregular banks.

Sir Joseph Bazalgette, describing the Low Level Sewer of south London, said it

drains Putney, Battersea, Nine Elms, Lambeth Newington, Southwark, Bermondsey, Rotherhithe, and Deptford, comprising an area of 20 square miles. The surface of this area is mostly below the level of high water, and is, in many places, 5 feet or 6 feet below it, having at one time been completely covered by the Thames.

Victorian historians incorrectly theorised that the Roman-era Thames practically had no banks, but instead spread out into a vast lagoon at high tide, and argued for a specious etymology of "London" as Llyndin ("lake fort"). The central bed of the Thames has not significantly changed position since it first became estuarine, and more recent research suggests that in Londinium the tide was not large, and at one time non-existent (see § The advancing head of tide).

=== Today ===
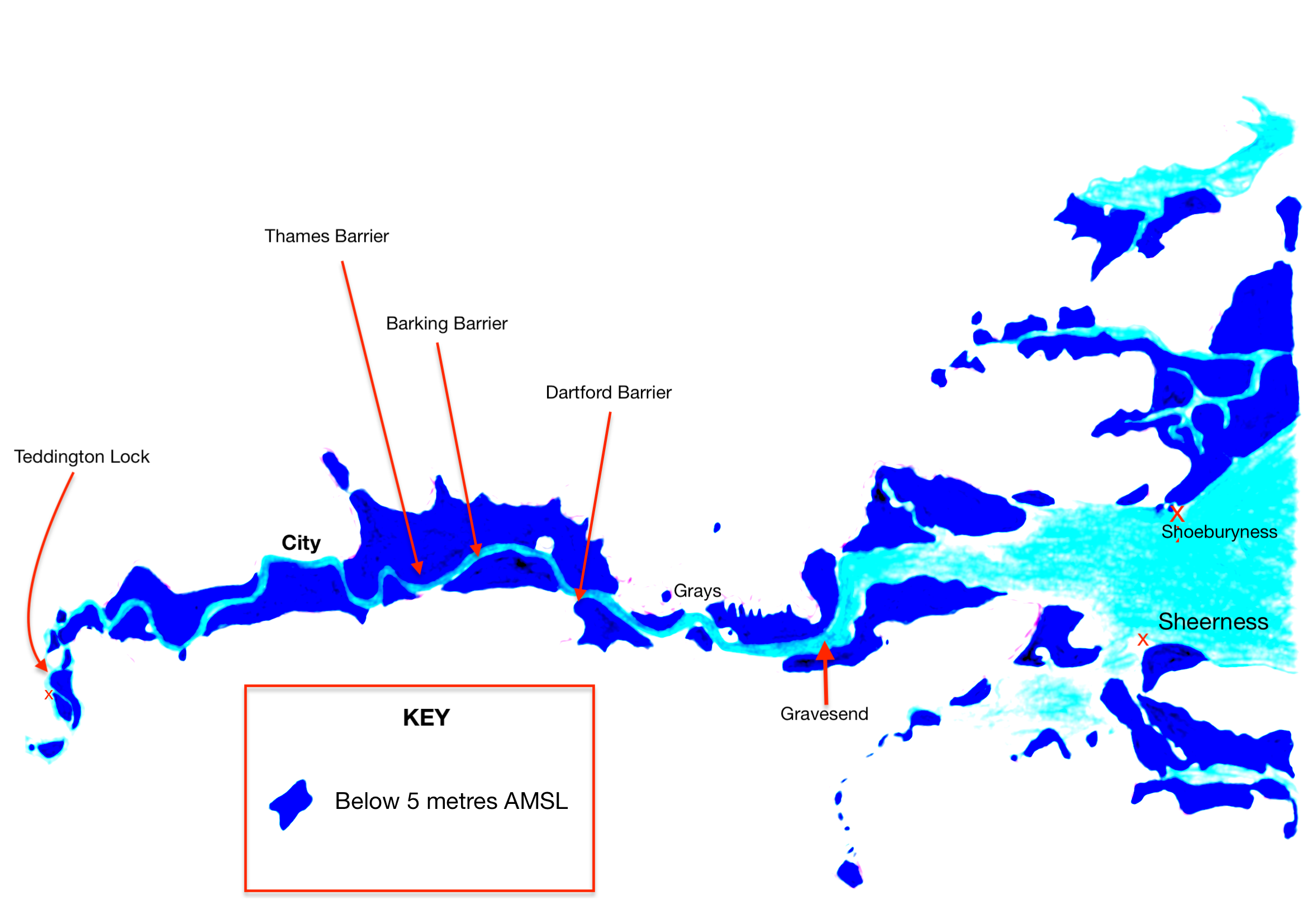
The low-lying areas (dark blue) defended by the river walls, where 1.25 million people live or work. (After Lavery & Donovan, 2005.)

In London the Thames flows through an alluvial plain, a geological formation which is 2 to 3 miles (3.2 to 4.8 km) wide. This flood plain is less than 25 feet (7.6 metres) above mean sea level, in places less than 5 feet (1.5 m). 35,000 hectares (140 sq mi) in size, it contains 500,000 properties at risk from flooding, plus 400 schools, 16 hospitals, 8 power stations, numerous industrial estates, London City Airport, dozens of surface and subterranean railway stations, and the central part of the London Underground network. An estimated 1.25 million people live and work in the tidal flood plain. 337 km (209 mi) of artificial barriers along the sides of the river form part of the flood defence network, in combination with nine major barriers which include the Thames Barrier at Woolwich, dozens of industrial floodgates, and hundreds of privately-owned minor moveable structures.

These artificial walls along its length make the modern river virtually a canal and laterally restrain it at high tide. It is 250 metres (820 ft) wide where it passes through central London. The continual processes of embanking and raising of its banks have increased its tidal range, which at London Bridge is 6.6 metres (22 ft), and the constriction of the river and subsequent hydrodynamic scouring have deepened it.

The walls also affect London's water table:

Over sections of Kings and Lambeth Reaches, the walls act as total cut-offs with their footings set in the effectively impermeable London Clay beneath the gravels. Elsewhere, however, the walls are founded at shallower depths and hydraulic continuity is probably maintained.

Hence in boreholes, groundwater levels in Battersea Park were observed to fluctuate with the tide; But just across the river in Chelsea, hardly at all. By 1971 nearly 7,000 tons of water had to be pumped from the Circle Line daily to maintain track drainage between West Kensington and Temple stations.

Where a tributary such as the River Lea meets the Thames it is necessary to cope with tidal water escaping laterally, traditionally managed by building walls alongside it. The walls must be carried high enough upstream to meet the rising land. In recent times some tributaries, such as Barking Creek and Dartford Creek, have been given barriers against exceptional tides.

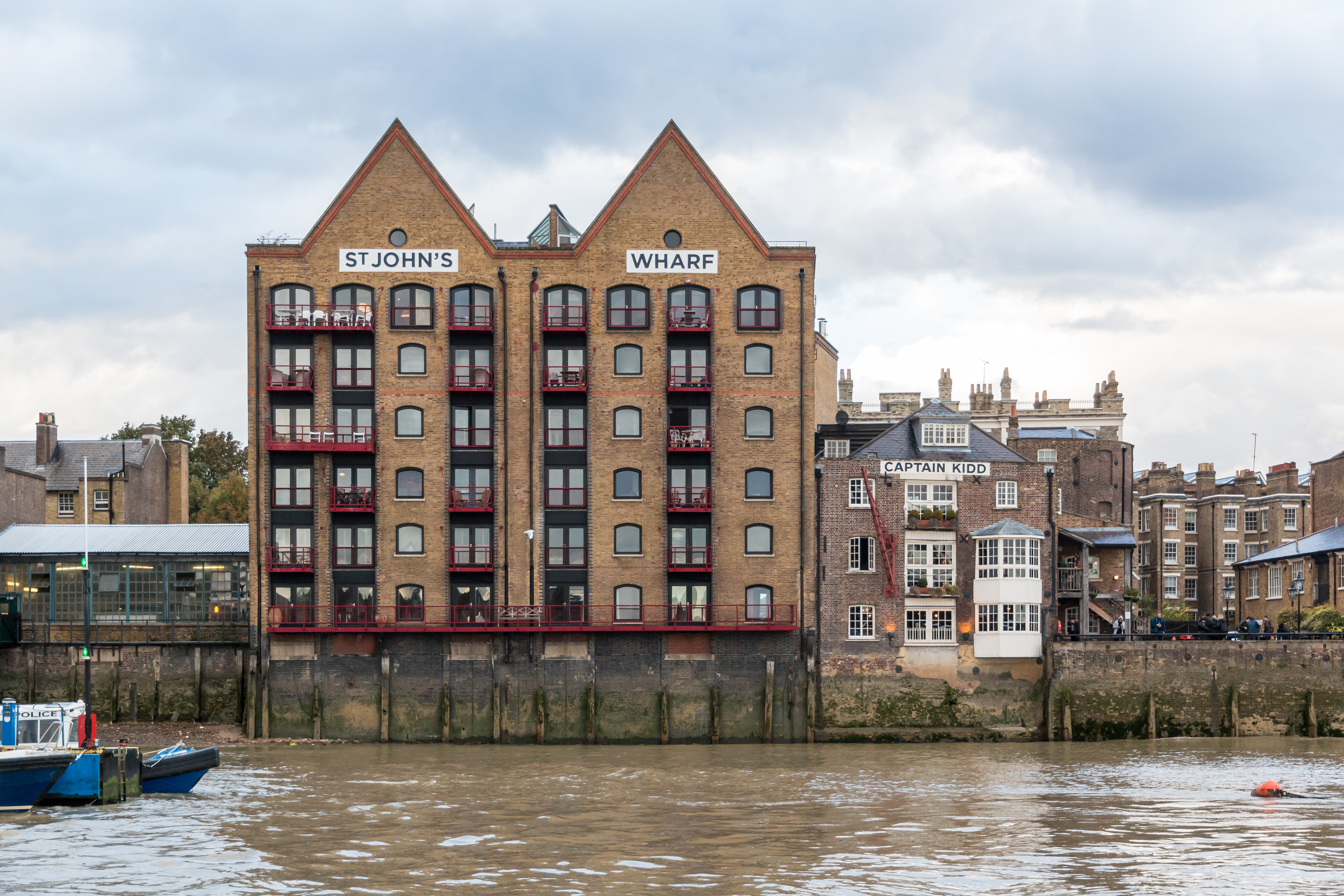
Wapping: warehouses—now flats and a pub—built on the wall

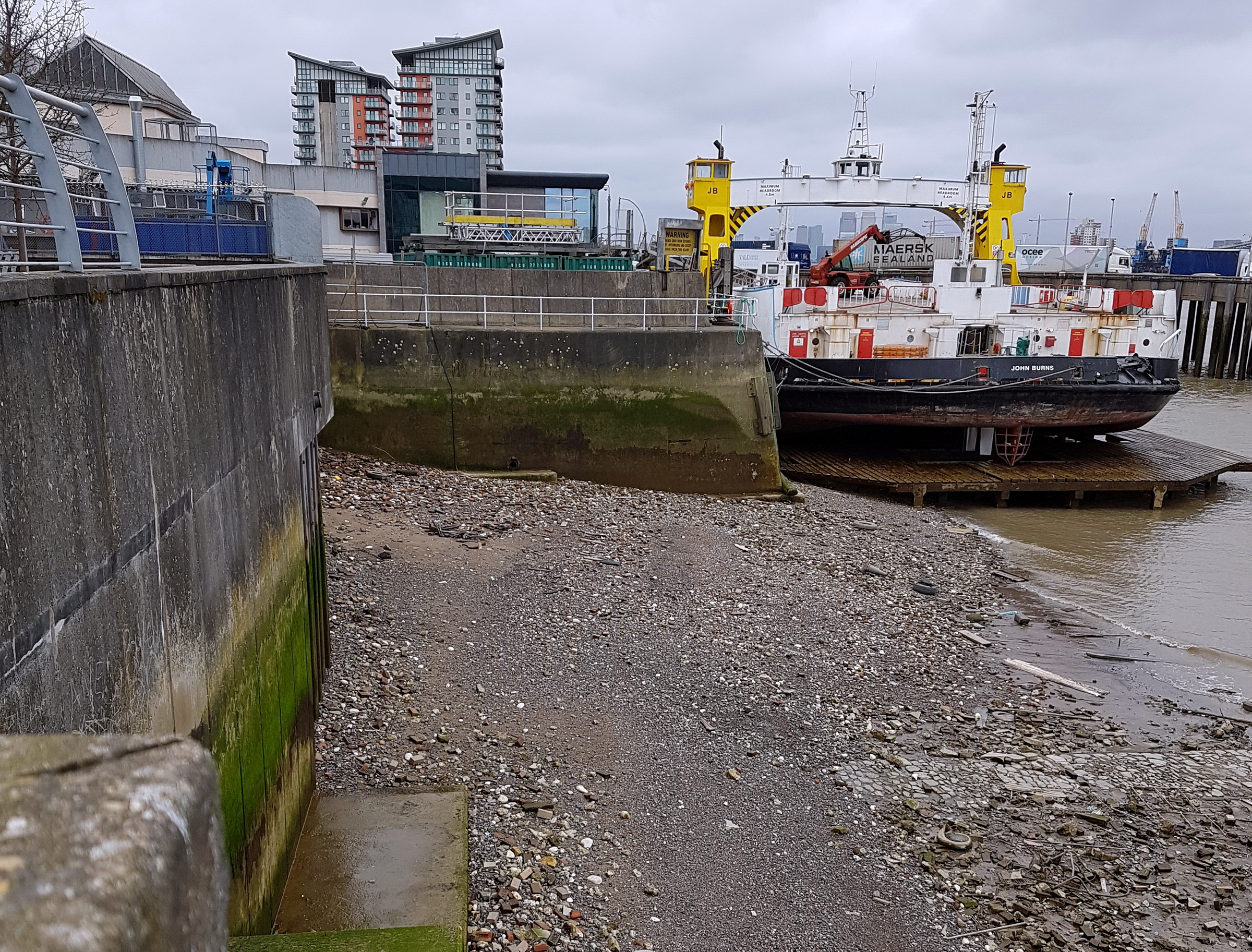
Woolwich: reconstructed wall and stairs

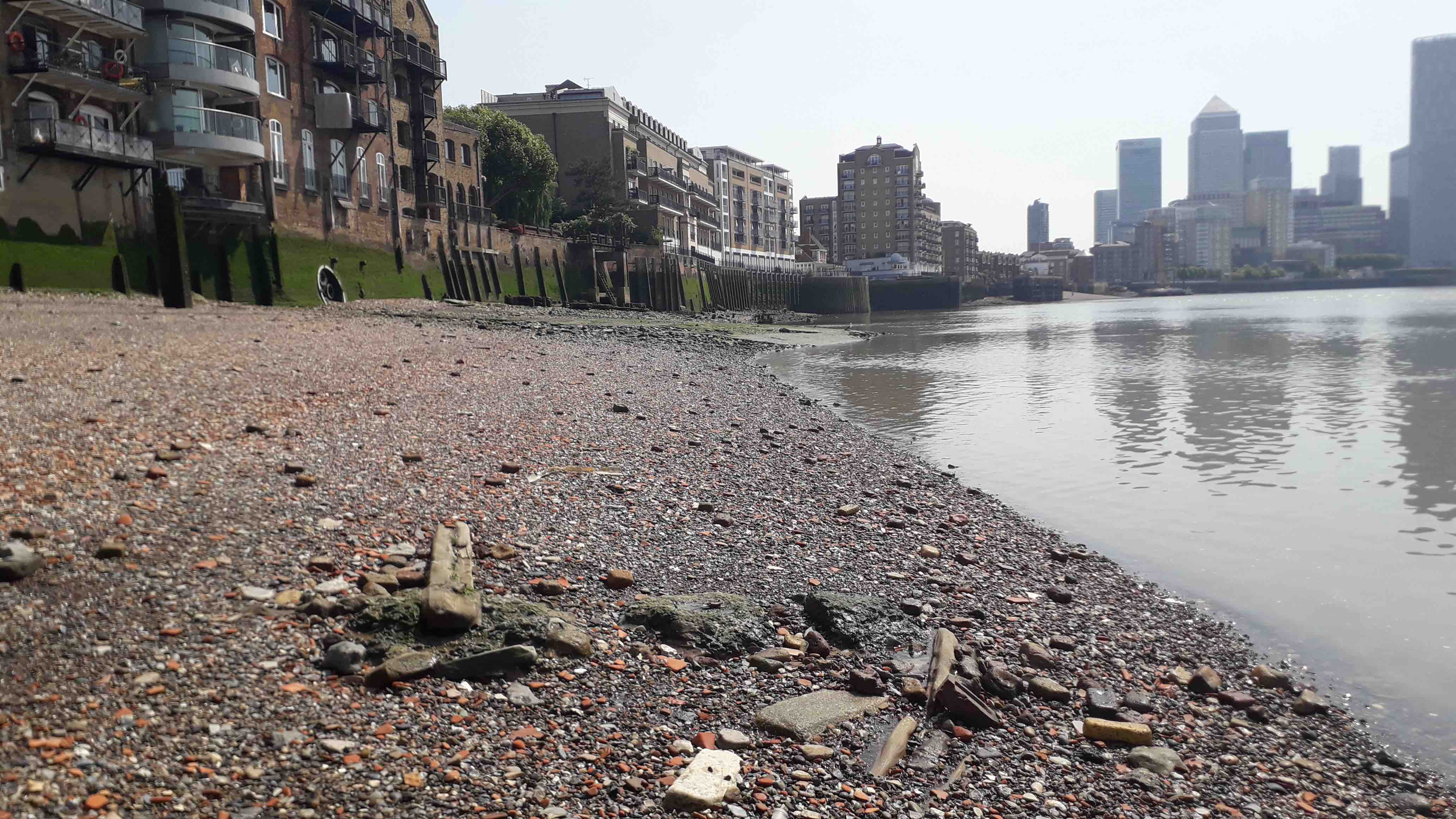
Limehouse: housing built on the wall

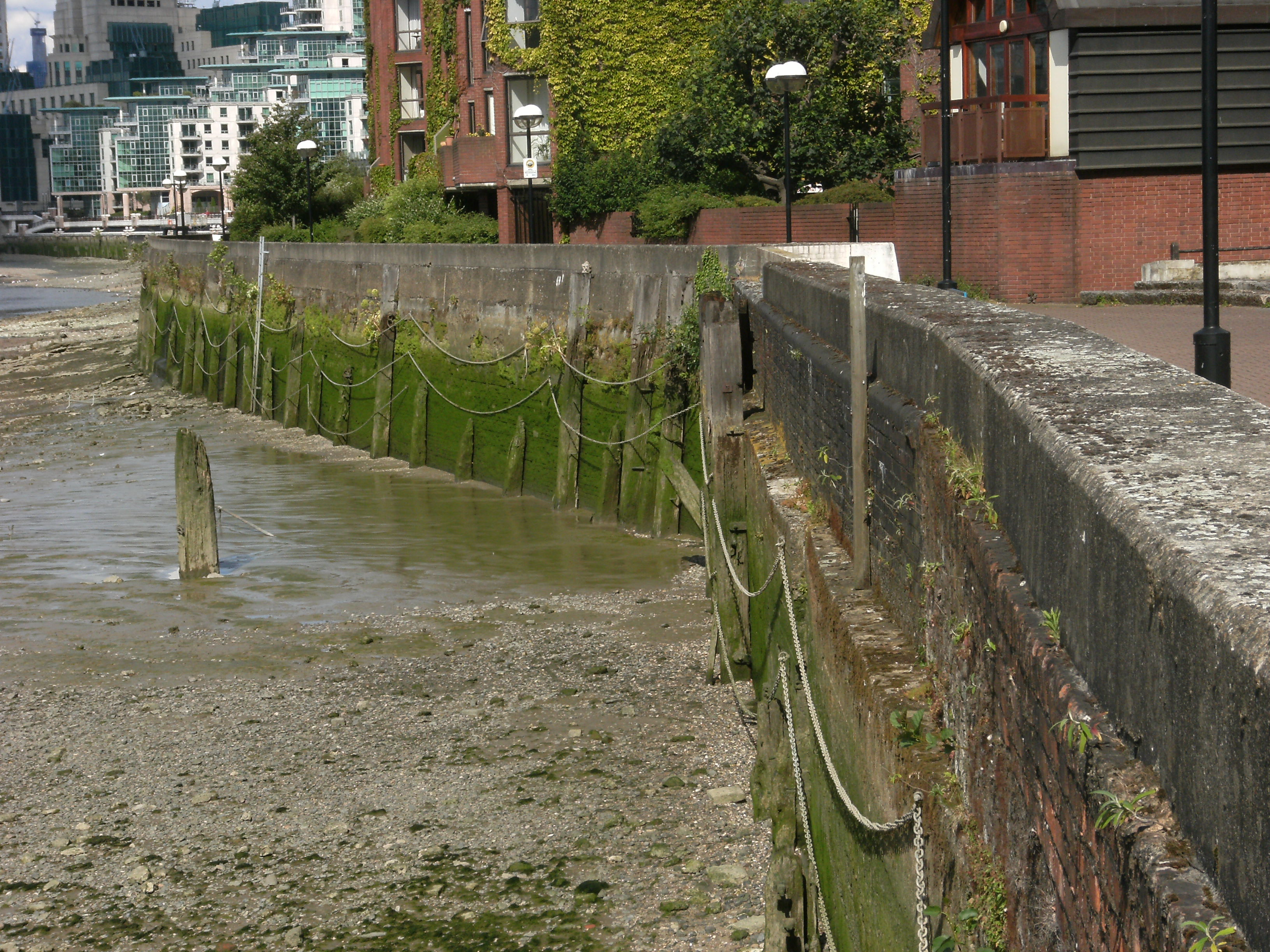
Nine Elms: wall near Vauxhall Bridge

== Who built the walls? ==
=== Early speculations ===
The Thames walls puzzled historians for centuries. Early modern thinkers knew the Thames walls must be old, but could not account for their origins.

The antiquarian Sir William Dugdale amassed a collection of legal records (1662) from which it was evident there were embankments along the Thames from the Middle Ages at least:

To attribute it unto the Britans (the primary Inhabitants of this Nation) or to the Saxons, who succeeded them, I dare not adventure; the first of these, being a people so rude and barbarous, as they were not verst in any Arts; and the latter so illiterate, for the most part, as that little of invention can justly be ascribed to them. That it was therefore a work of the Romans, whilst they were Masters here, as it is the opinion of some learned men, so do I make thereof no doubt.

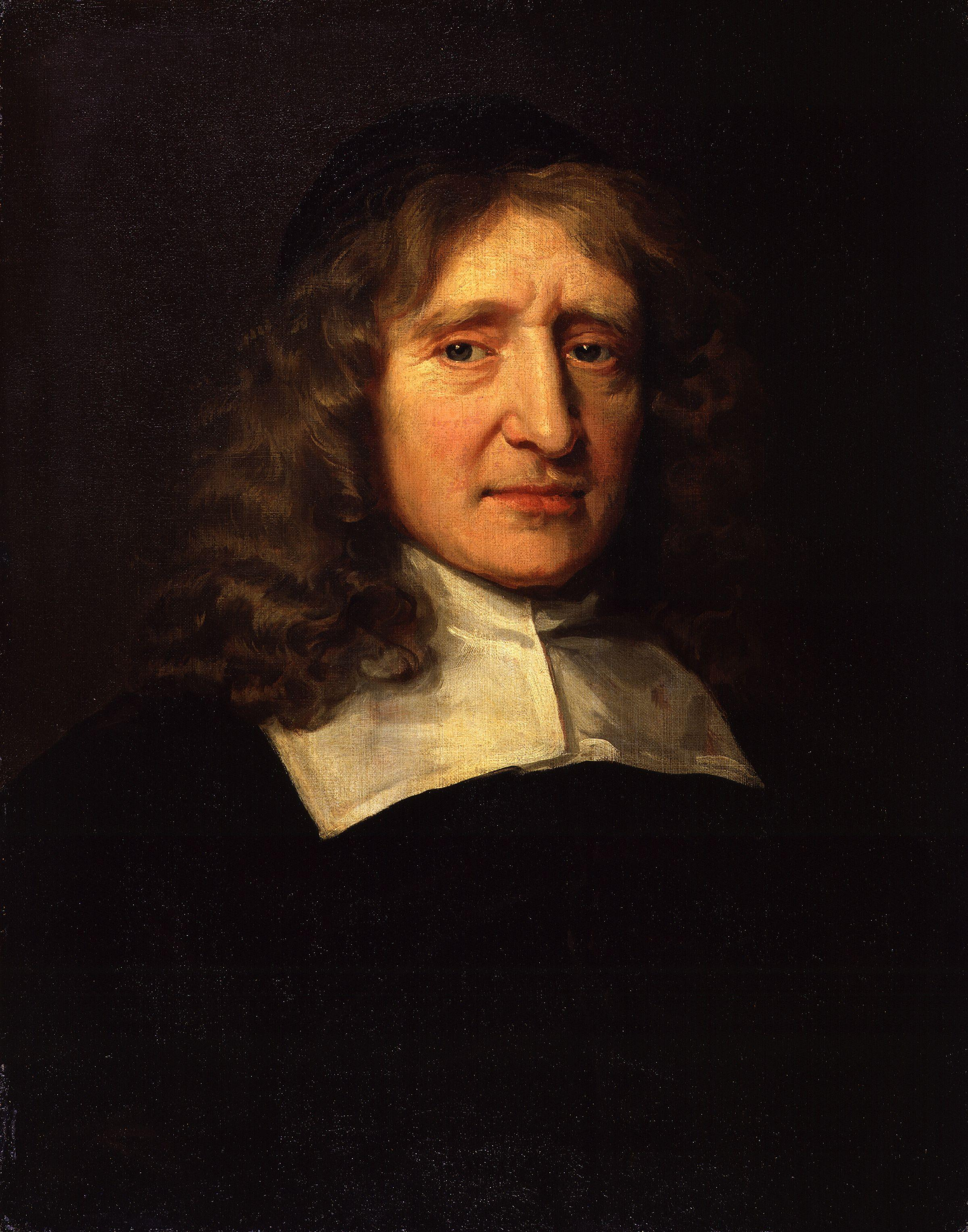
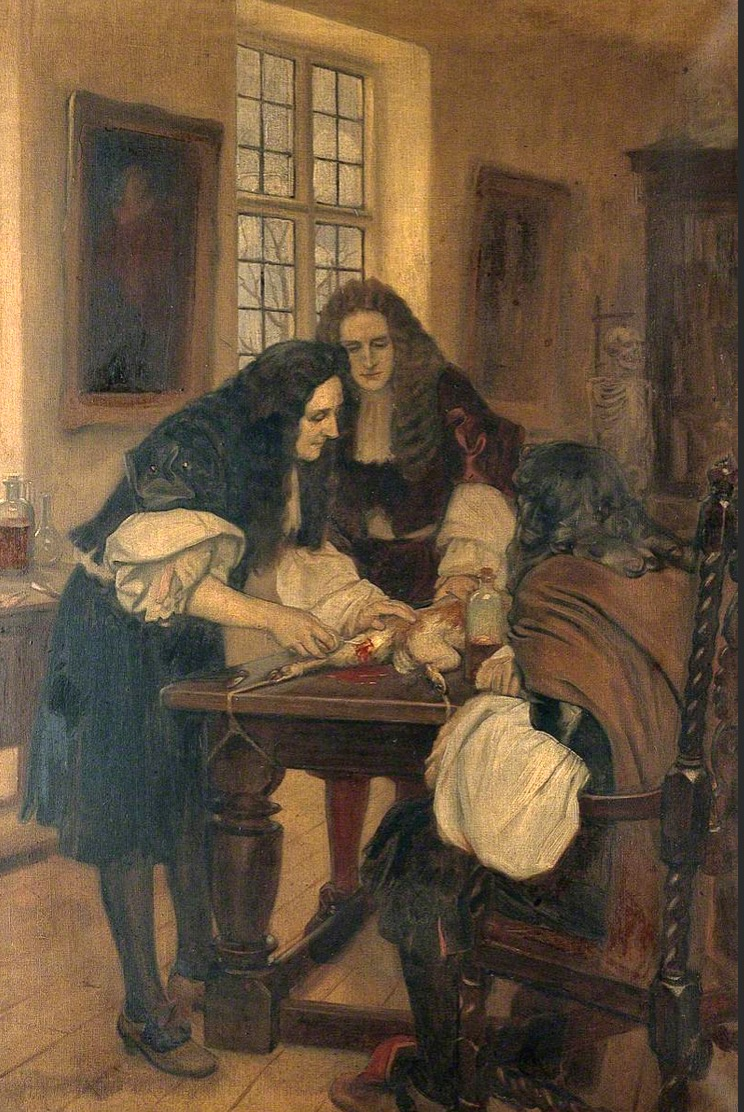
Early modern thinkers, like William Dugdale (left) and Christopher Wren, were convinced the Thames embankments were Roman.

The scientist and architect Sir Christopher Wren thought the walls were built to restrain wind-blown sand dunes, and attributed them to the Romans, for similar reasons. The influential Victorian engineer James Walker—who was himself to lay down the lines of the Thames Embankment in central London—thought the same, adding

That they are the result of skill and bold enterprise, not unworthy of any period, is certain.

Walter Besant was intrigued by the mystery. He noticed several small chapels in unpeopled places along the northern wall: he surmised they had been devoted to praying for its preservation.

One of the first writers to reject the "Roman" theory was Robert Peirce Cruden. In his History of Gravesend (1843) he pointed out that the Roman authorities had no incentive to build embankments on such a scale, nor were any embanked marshlands mentioned in Domesday Book (1086). He concluded that the Thames embankments between London and Gravesend were commenced early in the 12th century by religious houses for the purpose of reclaiming marshland "by easily executed approaches", and were completed in the 13th. Some others including the Astronomer Royal were sceptical too.

How the builders coped with 20-foot tides was not mentioned.

=== Flaxman Spurrell's explanation ===
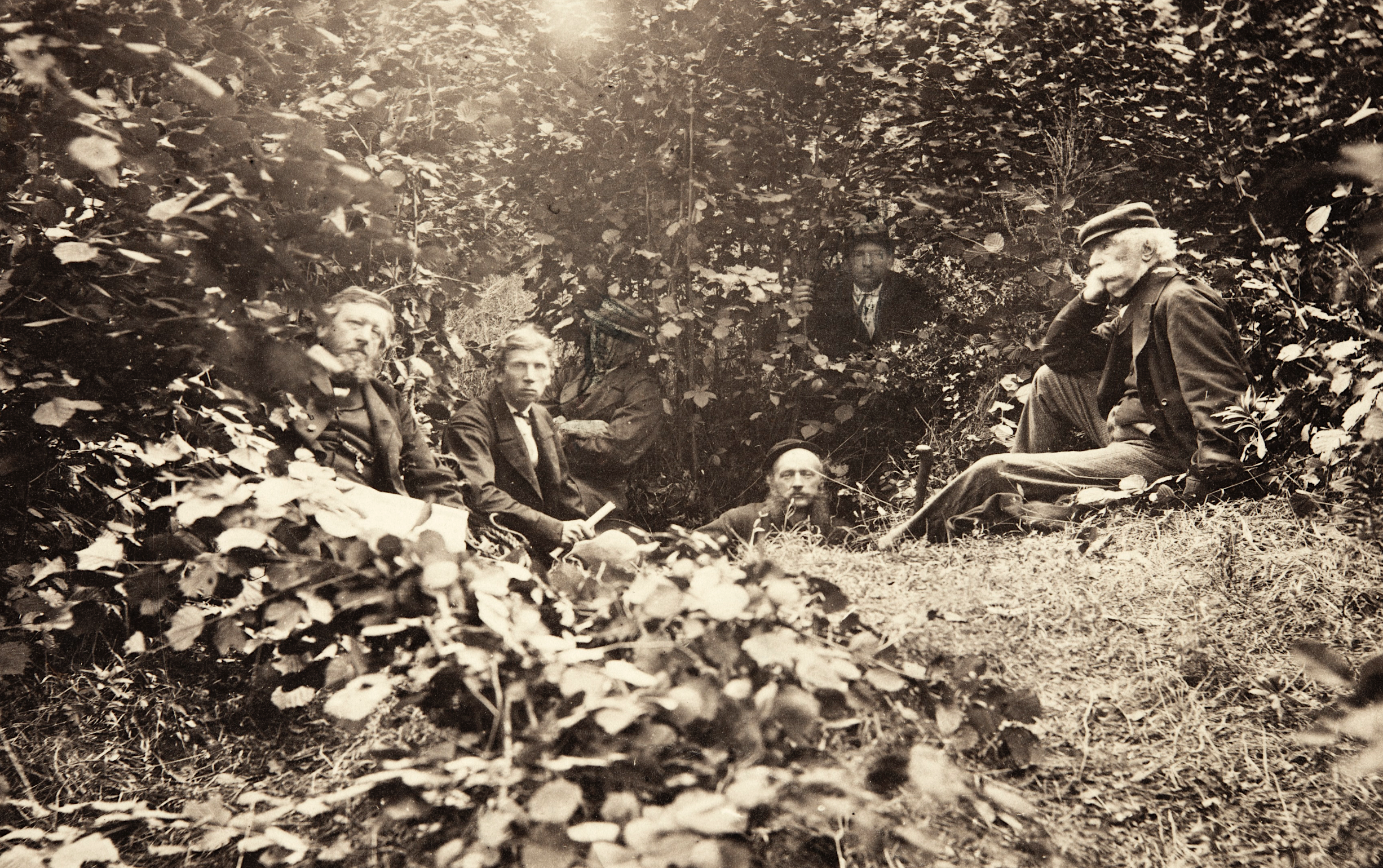
F.C.J. Spurrell (2nd from left, investigating a denehole) devoted his life to the Estuary's geology and archaeology

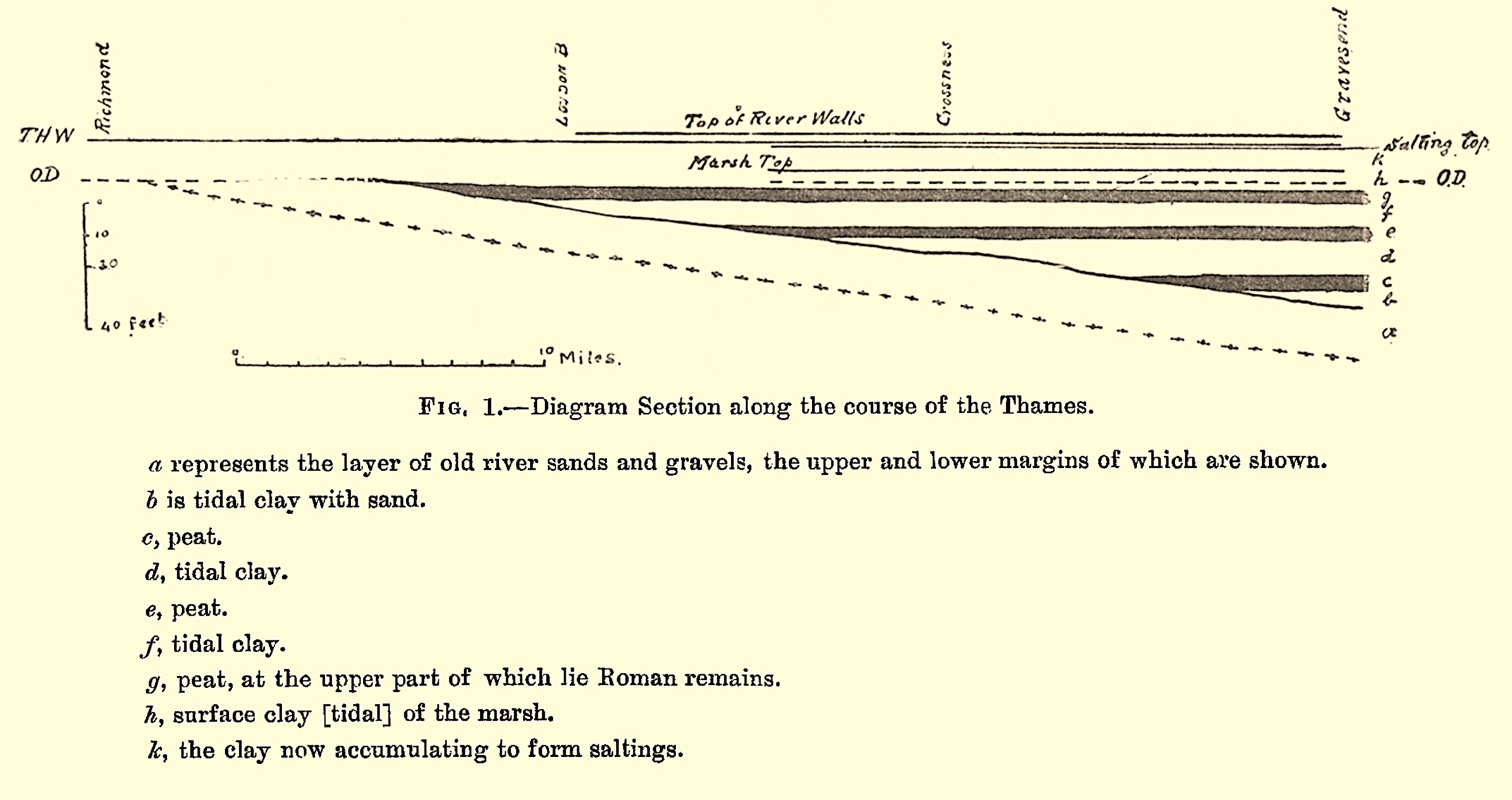
Section of River Thames, Richmond to Gravesend (vertically exaggerated). Clay deposition = sea gaining on land; peat growth = remissions; "THW" = Trinity High Water (Spurrell 1889).

In his Early Sites and Embankments on the Margins of the Thames Estuary (1885) F.C.J. Spurrell described his fascination with the topic:-

The sea-walls or tidal embankments of the Thames have not, I believe, ever been treated of before as a whole. I have for many years examined and mapped them, and made myself personally acquainted with the whole district of the Thames estuary, mainly for the purpose of learning what history they could be made to give of themselves.

Spurrell came to realise that large tides in the Thames are a relatively recent phenomenon. In the Middle Ages they were much smaller, where they existed at all. They would have posed no insuperable obstacle to land reclamation by farmers and other local people. It was those people who built the walls. As tides gradually increased over the centuries—which happened because the land was sinking—people easily raised them to match.

==== Sinking land, rising tide ====
Spurrell had visited the excavations for the Royal Albert Dock, the Port of Tilbury and Crossness Pumping Station, and in each place he saw—7 to 9 feet below the surface—traces of human habitation, including Roman-era pottery. This level was on top of a layer of peat, and was covered by a layer of mud. There were multiple layers of mud and peat. Spurrell thought the mud layers ("tidal clay") must have formed when the spring tides deposited sediment (a process still observable in his day at certain river margins, called Saltings). But peat formation must have required a long period of freedom from the tide in order for the vegetation to grow, especially since Estuary peat was often associated with the roots of yew trees ("the yew is intolerant of water and cannot live in salt").

From these data, and from sightings of fossils like estuarine shells and diatoms, Spurrell proposed that the Thames was a freshwater river originally, but had been invaded by the sea, owing to subsidence of the land.

By the continued sinking of the land, the sea gradually crept up the valley until, at the present day, the ordinary tide reaches as far as Richmond.

But, he said, the process was not uniform, because sometimes the land subsidence paused—maybe reversed—as was indicated by the peat layers. He thought the tidal limit in Roman times was further down the river. The river was much shallower than today. It was "not too much to suggest that the tidal water, such as now reaches London, might then have been full five-and-twenty miles away". As a later commentator explained, "The Romans did not build the embankments, not because they could not, but because they had no need to".

Spurrell's theory has been described as a "startling suggestion" since shown to be probably correct. "[M]ost modern authorities would agree with Spurrell (1889) that the alluvial plain was an area of marsh dissected by creeks, and that the tidal limit was further seaward than today". (The sinking of the land with respect to sea level is best described as relative, however, since it is a complex of several factors: see The advancing head of tide, below.)

==== The origins of the walls ====
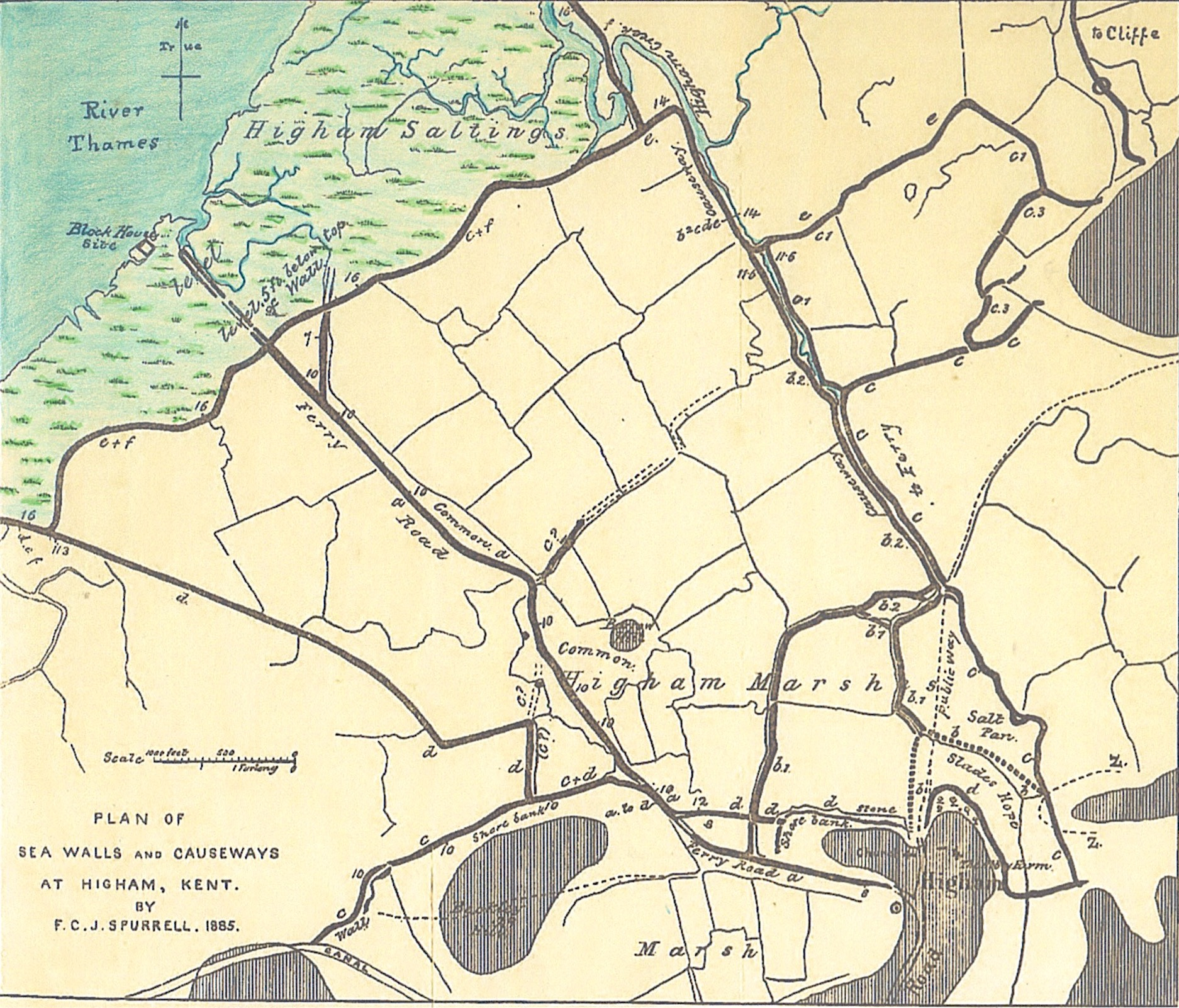
Archaeology: how farmland was won, Higham, Kent. Walls are marked (oldest to newest) a to f. Older river walls, obsolete, lie inland; newer walls needed to be taller as waters rose. Hatched = high ground. Thames continues to deposit mud on Saltings at high spring tides. (Spurrell 1885)

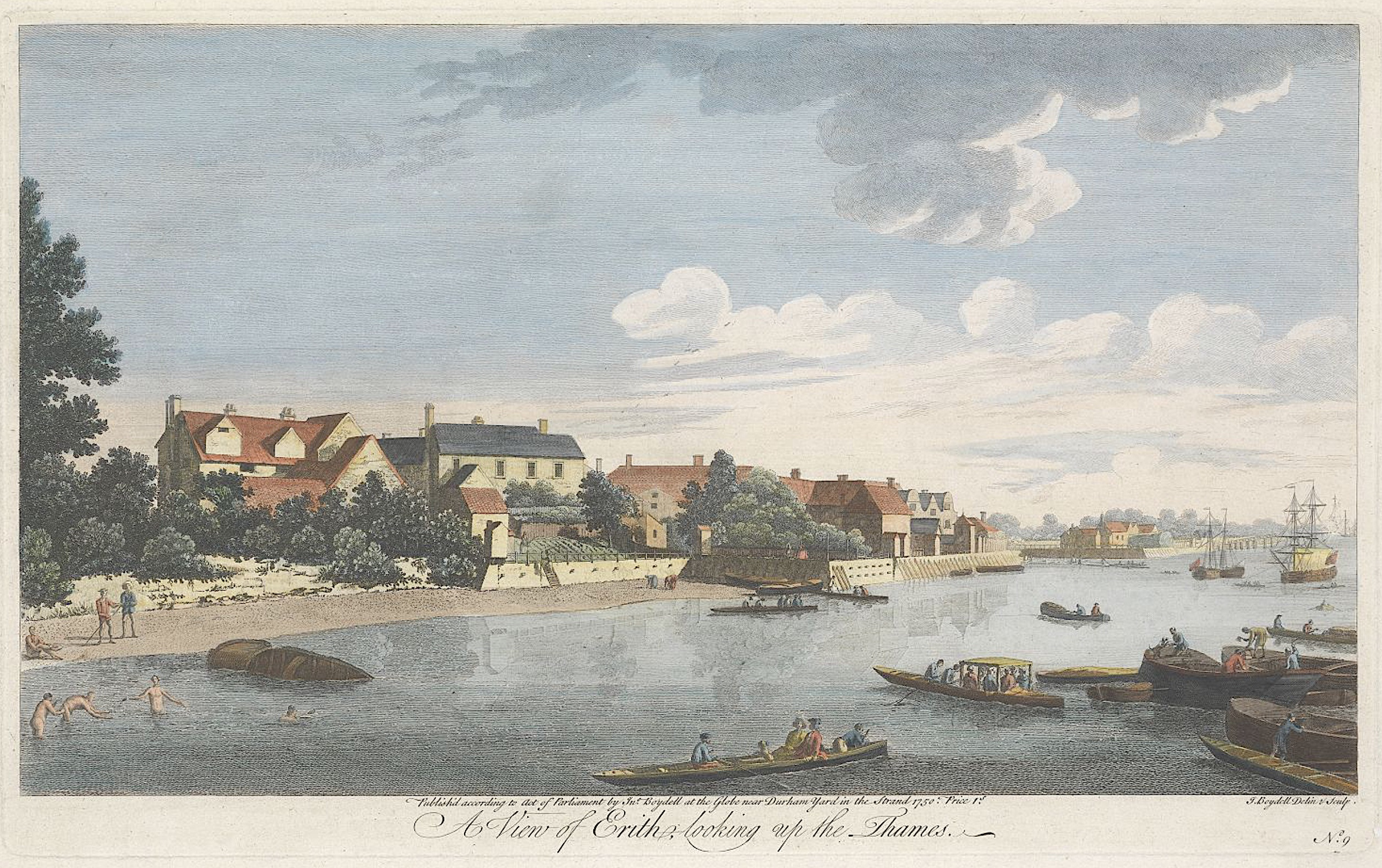
River walls, still irregular, Erith, Kent, 1750 (John Boydell: Yale Center for British Art)

As a specimen of his maps, Spurrell published the one of Higham, Kent shown here. It had a network of walls enclosing reclaimed marshland. The highest walls were the current tidal defences; progressively lower walls lay inland and were (he said) the old defences. The Thames at high spring tides continued to deposit mud on the Saltings but of course not on the landside areas; these were now lower. This was an instance of land reclamation by successive 'inning' of marshland (see below).

Large amounts of Romano-British pottery could be found in the Kent marshes in Spurrell's day ("I have seen over a hundred unbroken pots at one time, and such immense quantities of broken fragments, that the new embankment of the railway there was in places made of them".) But the levels of human occupation were feet below the present-day marsh:

There was an abundant Roman population here, but if there are any banks in existence by which the sea was then kept out, they must be far out in the marsh, and I fear buried beneath its present surface; for all the present banks are mediæval or modern, here as elsewhere.

Towards the end of his life he wrote:

The walls were thrown up to win the land from the water, and it was not until the union of the parallel walls had been nearly or quite completed, that it was perceived that a much more important thing to the country at large had occurred, viz., the deepening and straightening of the common water-way [the Thames]. For as the parallel banks approached each other the tidal currents ran more swiftly and the scour increased, so that the waterway was shortened and larger ships could travel further inland.

In this waterway grew the largest port in the world.

=== Later research ===
John H. Evans writing before the 1953 floods and using data from boreholes and similar sources found that Roman-era human occupation sites were well above the high water levels of the era, hence needed no defensive embankments. But water levels continued to rise; so that (in his words):

- Throughout the Saxon period this land surface was gradually subsiding (or the tide advancing).
- Between A.D. 900 and 1000 the high Spring tide started to overflow over the lower parts of this land surface.
- By the twelfth and thirteenth centuries the overflow of the tide reached such frequency and proportions that the first river-walls were erected to exclude it.
- Since that time these river-walls have been constantly heightened and extended, nevertheless, during the whole history of inning down to the present century, inned marshes have been lost to the sea, some permanently.

Spurrell's theory was supported by the radiocarbon dating of Thames microfossils by Robert Devoy (1979).

== Building the walls: incentives and methods ==
=== Winning farmland ("inning") ===
Inning was a land reclamation process in which riverside marshland was enclosed and drained. Starting from hard ground, typically farmers would build out into the marsh a pair of cross-walls, called counter walls. Then they would complete the gap by building a wall between the ends. The strip of marshland was now enclosed, and could be drained. Such an enclosure was often called a hope, which occasionally survives in English placenames.

Drained marshland was exceptionally fertile, and might be worth two or three times (or even six times) as much as ordinary farmland, since grain could be grown and shipped to London (population 80,000), one of Europe's largest cities. However, as the land dried, the peaty soil shrank, lowering the surface well below high water mark, and making it all the more imperative to maintain the wall.

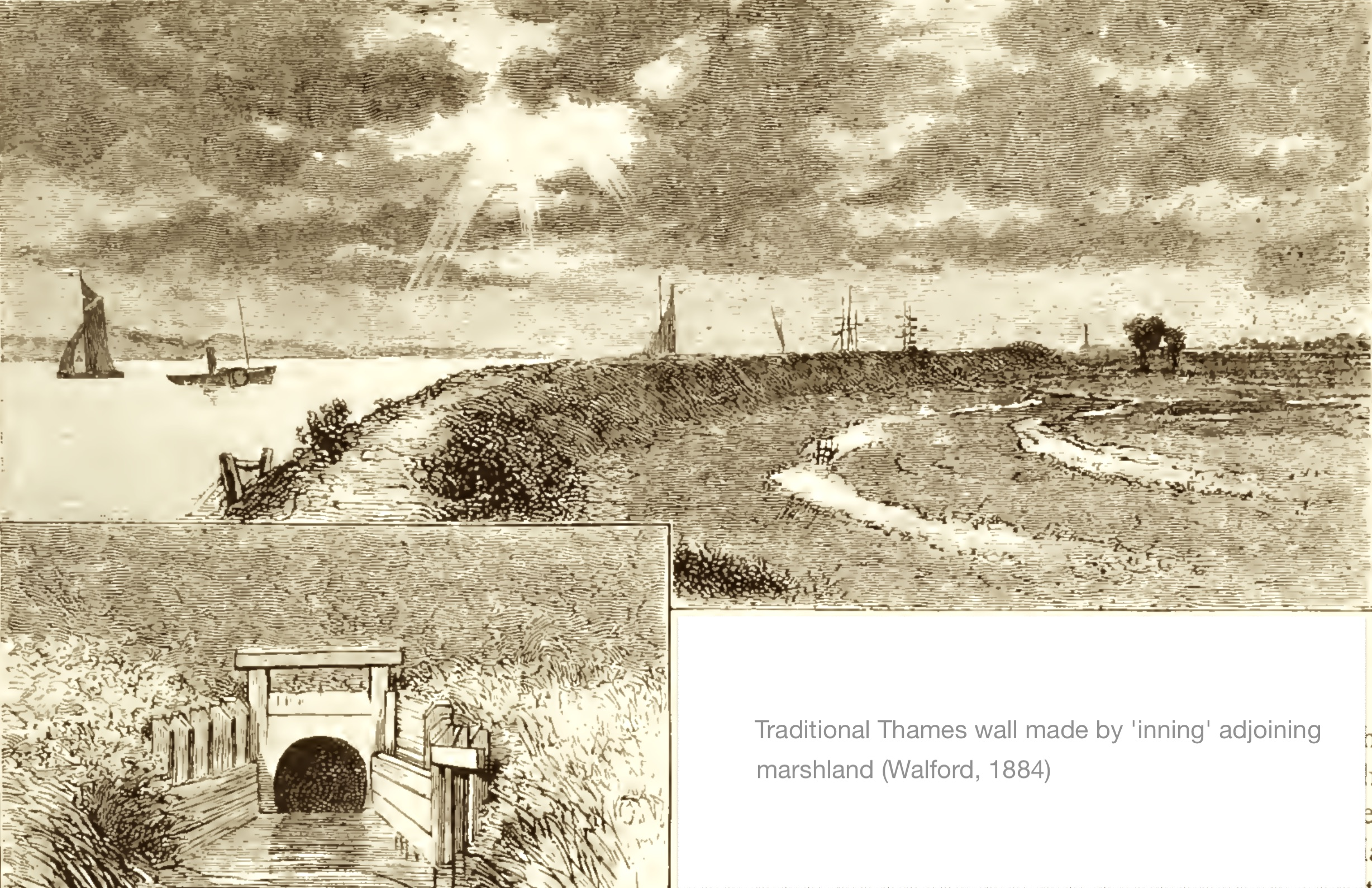
1

2
1. Traditional Thames wall in Essex obtained by "inning" riverside marshland with (inset) a sluice for draining surface runoff water at low tide
2. Mature farmland won by inning, Woolwich to Erith. This map shows another pattern of old, new and cross-walls, probably initiated by the monks of Lesnes Abbey. The old walls having served their purpose are now inland. "The oldest and strongest wall was that on which Belvedere station stands; it may belong to the XIII century". From Flaxman Spurrell's classic 1885 paper "Early sites and embankments on the margins of the Thames Estuary". Today this land supports substantial towns.

Ditches were dug to drain the enclosed marsh. The water would flow out at low tide through a sluice set in the river wall. Also, sluices were essential to allow surface runoff water to escape. Though sluices varied, they were often made from hollowed tree trunks; one design comprised a hinged flap that closed tight when the tide rose. It was important to have a tight seal, for leakage would erode and widen any gap. A storm surge could wash the entire sluice out of the embankment; it was said to be "blown up". Captain Perry said that many inundations came through poorly designed or maintained sluices that blew up.

If the river did break through, the water would flow onto neighbours' lands too, unless the counter walls had been properly kept up. Most disputes between neighbours concerned failure to maintain in good condition the river wall, counter walls, sluices or drainage ditches.

Mature inned farmland had a characteristic pattern like a crazy chequerboard, old walls standing well inland, new walls constituting the river's tidal banks.

As far as the riverfront was concerned, the net result of inning in various places was a series of disparate river walls. In time these were gradually connected to form a continuous wall.

==== Materials ====
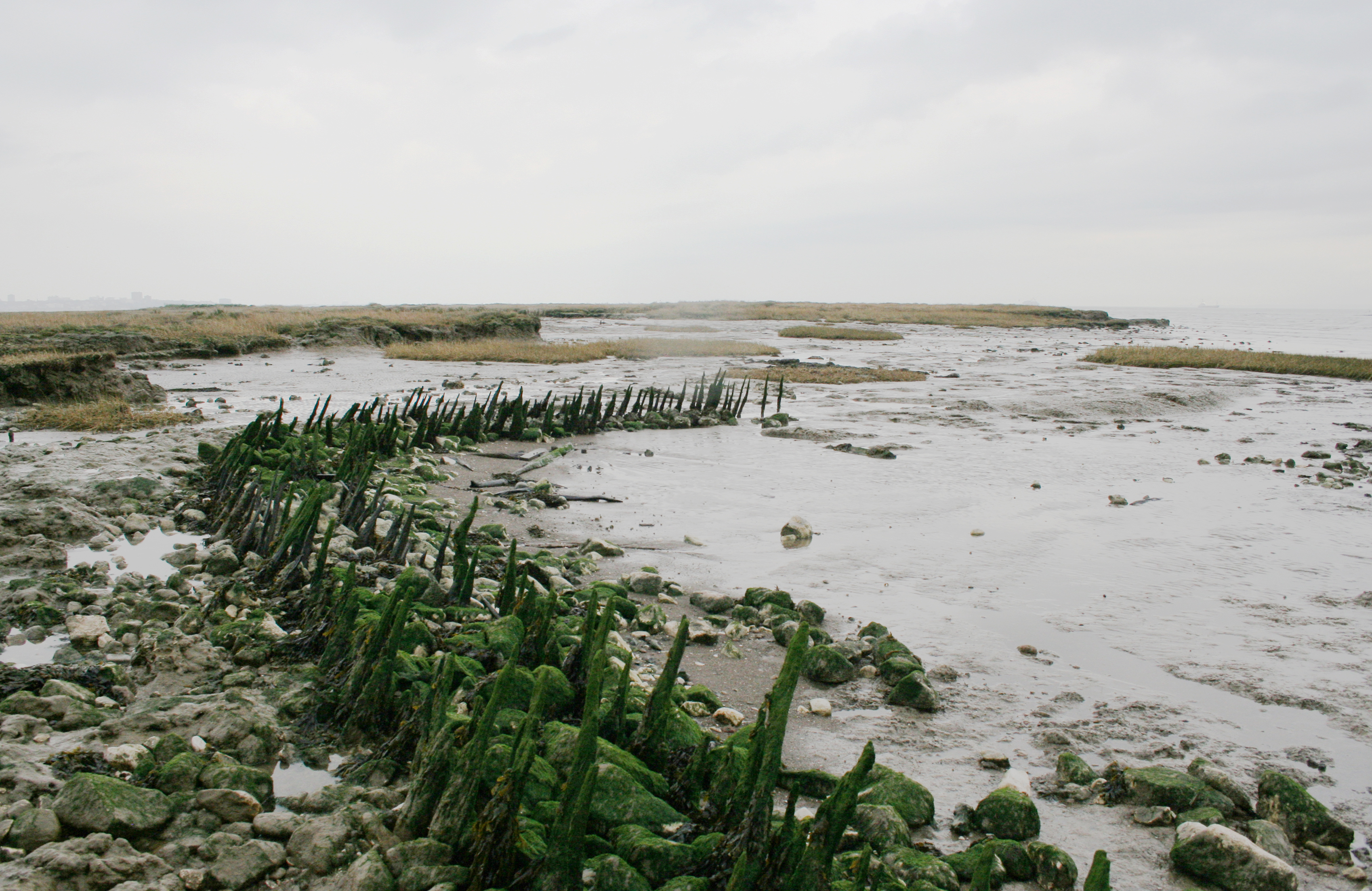
Remains of a wall that had internal stakes (saltings, Canvey Island)

Traditionally, embankments in the Thames Estuary were made from clay dug out from the marsh, faced with bundles of brushwood or rushes to prevent erosion. Routine maintenance work consumed regular quantities of coppice wood each year. Sometimes, to anchor them, walls were made from a core of driven stakes and bushes and faced with smooth clay; already in 1281 there is a record of this for Plumstead Marshes.

The height of the walls was increased over time (see below) but this caused problems with stability, slumpage and slipping. Later improvements have included facings of Kentish ragstone, tightly packed granite or sandstone to reduce erosion from navigational wash; the use of chalk instead of clay; protecting the walls with interlocking concrete blocks; and the use of gently sloping profiles to increase stability and absorb wave energy. Writing in the mid-Victoria era, before the walls were kept up by government agencies, an author recorded that the typical Thames wall comprised an earthen embankment sloping 20° towards the river and 45° towards the land, fortified by tiers of stakes, at intervals rammed with lumps of chalk or stone; in places the new river-churning steamers had made it advisable to use granite. Vigilance in preserving the wall was carefully prescribed in leases.

==== Saltings ====
Land on the river side of the wall was called the saltings, where spring tides deposited mud. Salting was itself valuable grazing land for sheep. Vegetation in the saltings protected the wall from wave attack; to enhance this protection, local people were sometimes banned from cutting reeds. Saltings—a natural form of flood defence—have now almost disappeared from the Thames owing to human intervention.

==== Political consequences ====
Medievalist Bryce Lyon argued that—as in other parts of Northwest Europe e.g. Flanders and Holland—the demand for motivated labour needed for land reclamation in the Thames marshes contributed to the rise of independent farmers and the decay of the feudal system. "This definitely is the case around the estuary of the Thames".

=== In response to the advancing head of the tide ===
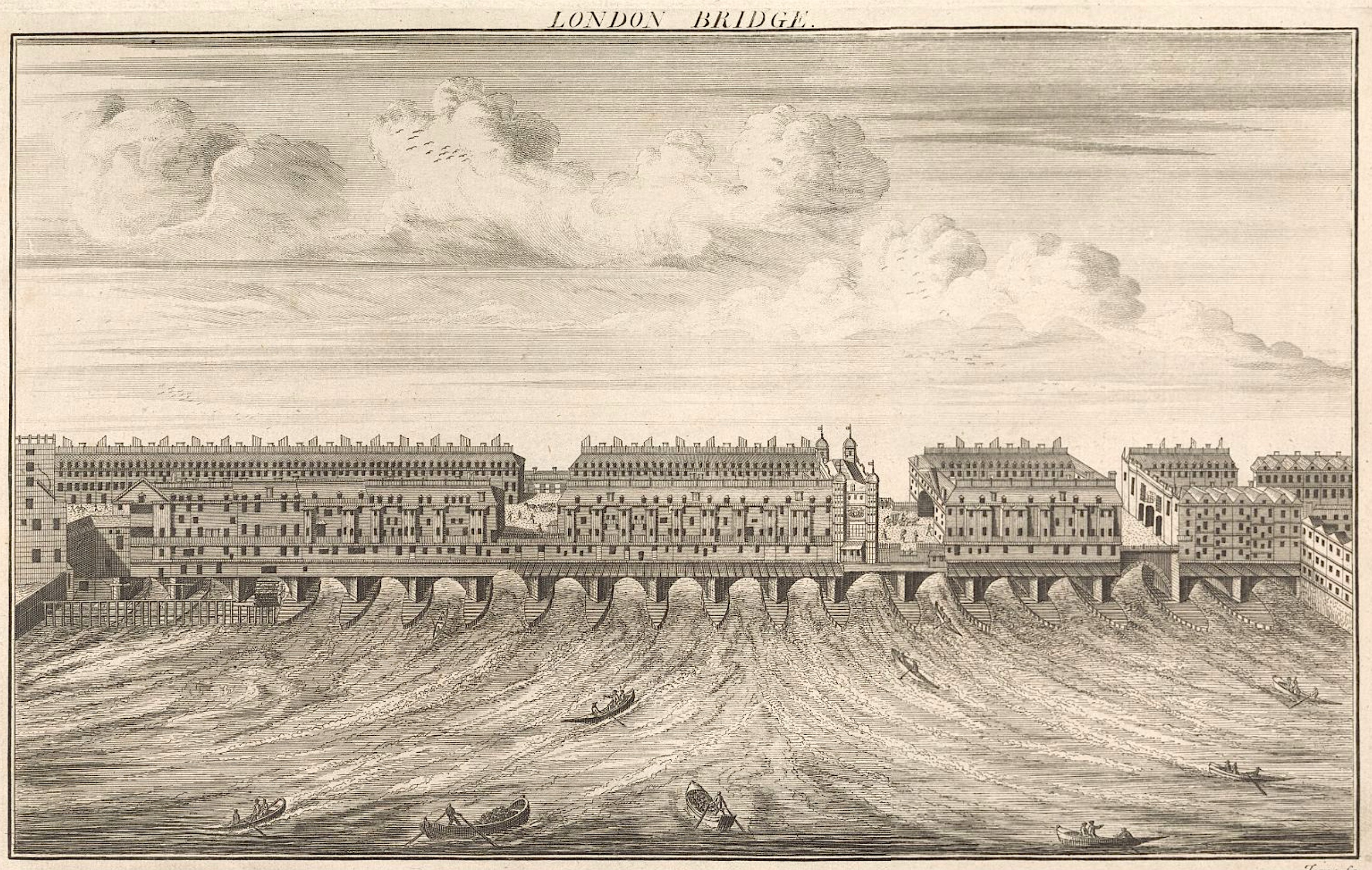
Tidal rapids at London Bridge, around 1730. The old bridge acted like a weir; boatmen shot the rapids at their peril. (William Henry Toms: Yale Center for British Art)

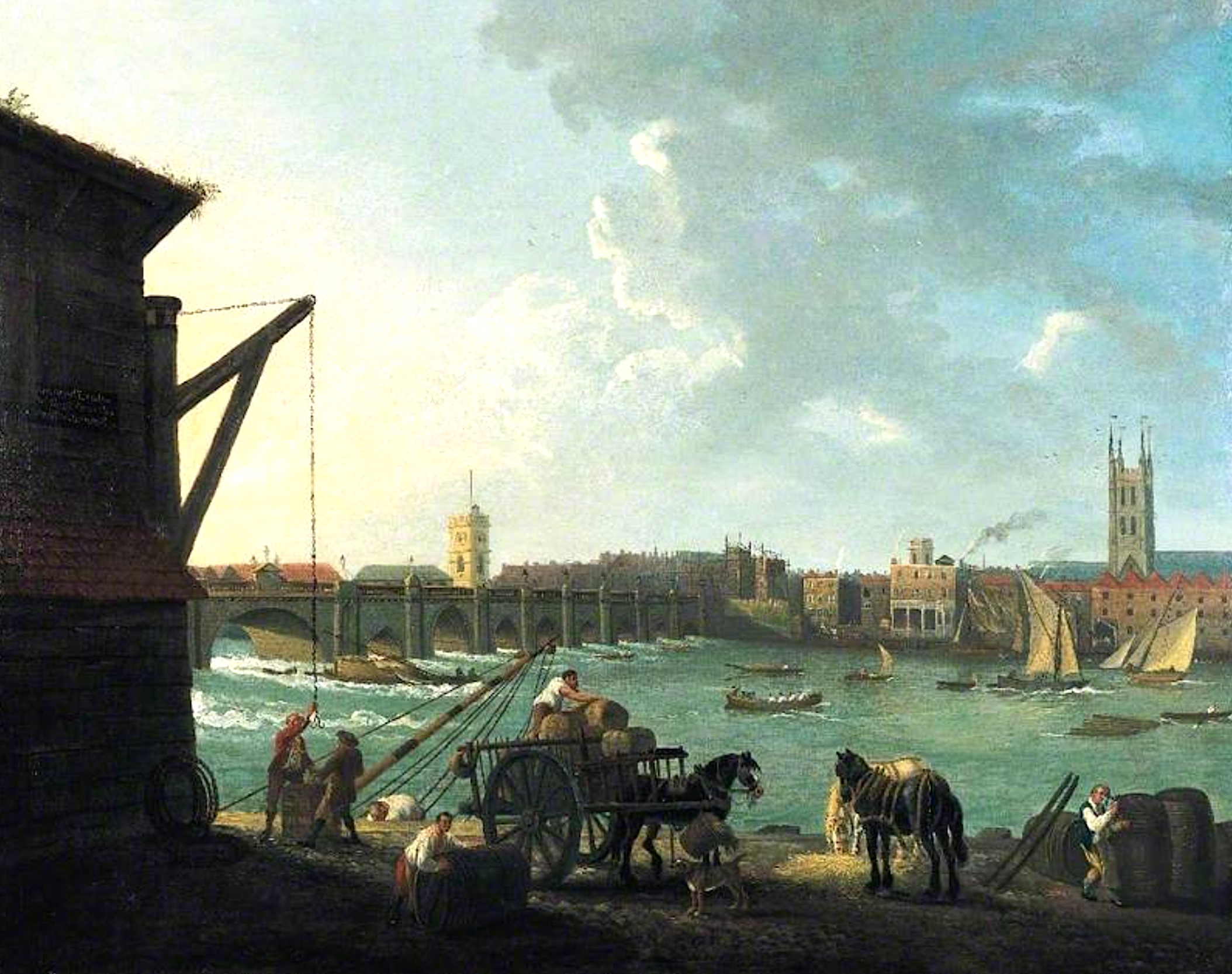
London Bridge from the Old Swan. Prudent passengers preferred to alight at the Old Swan, and walk. (Herbert Pugh: Bank of England Museum)

Today, the River Thames is macro-tidal at London Bridge, and is tidal as far upriver as Teddington Lock. This was not always so.

In the last 6,000 years (at least) sea level in southeast Great Britain has been rising relative to the land, owing to sinking of the land mass by compaction, subaerial erosion, long-term tectonic movement and isostatic adjustment, as well as eustatic sea level changes and even human activity. According to one estimate it has been doing so at an average rate of up to 13–16 cm per century; the rate has not been constant, and there have been temporary reversals. Today "the mean sea level at the mouth of the estuary is rising relative to the land at about 30 cm/century and the mean high water level in Central London appears to be increasing at more than twice this rate".

In the Roman period the London alluvial plain was an area of marsh dissected by creeks; the tidal limit may have been as far downriver as Crossness. On that estimate there would have been no tide at London Bridge at all. Gustav Milne thought there was a small tide at Londinium, falling back to nothing in the late Roman period. Research on this topic continues; it includes dating excavated wharves and tide mills by dendrochronology.

While river-bank dwellers might be prepared to live with occasional storm flooding, tidal high water occurs twice every 25 hours or nearly so. Thus as the tidal head advanced—and the tidal range increased—there would have come a time when the water routinely overflowed or eroded the natural river bank unless artificial banks were made.

At first, low walls sufficed (archaeologists discovered one embankment in north Kent had been only 1.2 metres high). As water levels rose over the centuries the walls were raised. Explained Flaxman Spurell:

Many writers are impressed with the "mighty", "stupendous", or "vast" embankments which keep out the water of the river, while Dugdale and Wren seem to have thought that because they were so great, none but Romans could have raised them. There is no need for such expressions. The height to which we see them now rise, is the gradual increase from slighter banks which costs but little exertion, although regular attention.

=== In response to storm surges ===
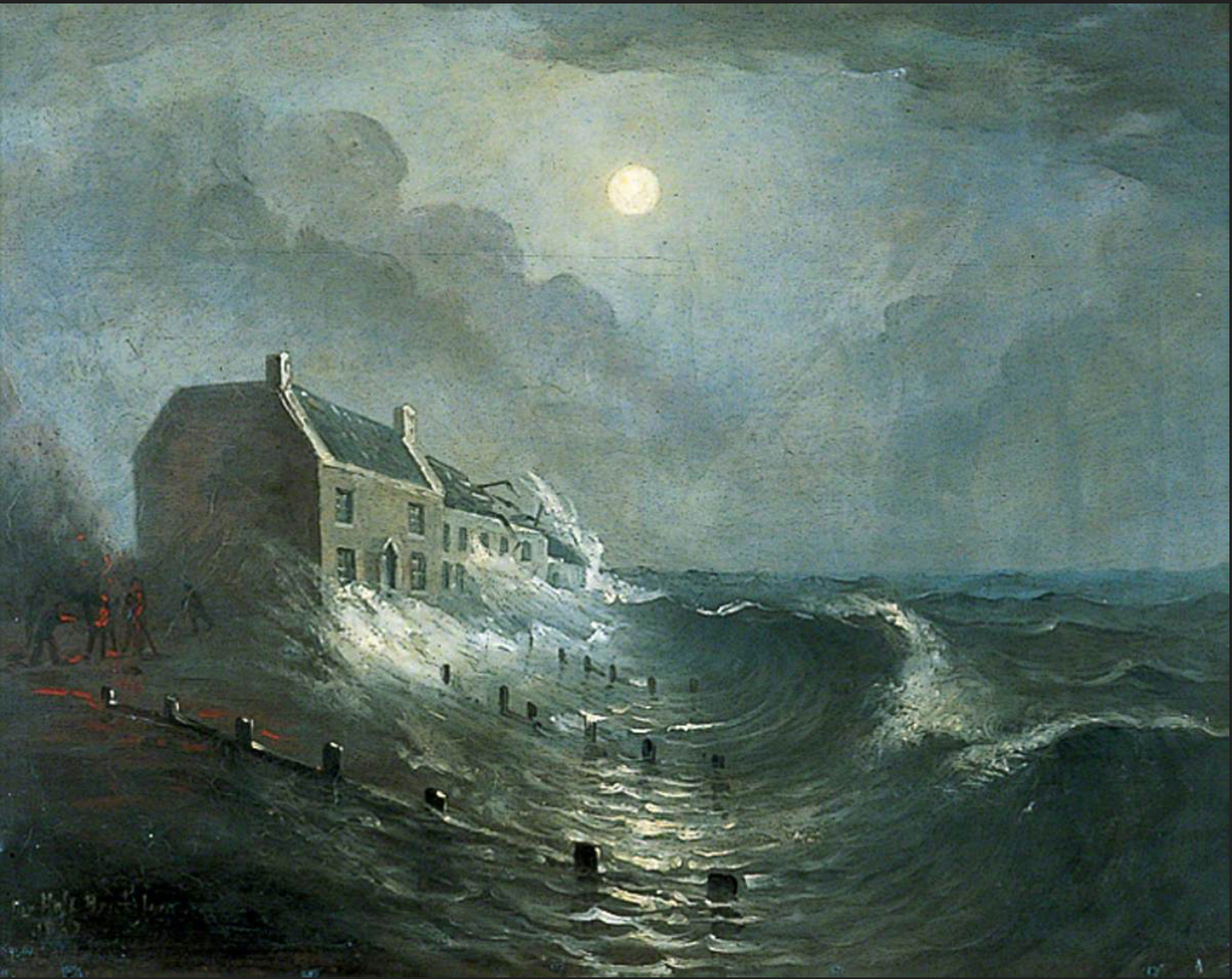
Storm surge. The Half-Brick Inn, 1867 (Edwin Compton: Worthing Museum and Art Gallery)

1573 A.D.

"Marsh wall too slight, strength now or good night" — Thomas Tusser, October's Husbandry

That keeping up the banks cost "little exertion" may have been true in Spurrell's day, but not in the late Middle Ages. The era 1250–1450 was characterised by a deteriorating climate, storm surges and serious flooding. This topic has been researched by Hilda Grieve and particularly James A. Galloway who have examined the accounts of medieval monasteries and manors.

Storm surges, explained Galloway, are caused by:

movement of deep Atlantic depressions around the north of Scotland, subsequently veering south into the North Sea. This can produce a wind-driven piling up of water in the shallow and narrow North Sea basin and, when combined with a high tide, can lead to disastrous flooding and major loss of life in the low-lying coastlands of the Netherlands, Belgium and England.

They made for freak high tides in the Thames, especially if coinciding with unusually heavy land flooding (e.g. from a snow melt or a heavy rainstorm).

The river broke through the wall at Bermondsey (1294); Southwark (1311); Dagenham, and between Greenwich and Woolwich (1320s); Stepney (1323); the North Kent marshes (1328); Southwark (again), between Greenwich and Plumstead, Stone, Kent (1350s) and Stepney (again) (1369); Barking (1374-5); Dartford, Erith (1375) and elsewhere. The Black Death pandemic killed so many labourers it became harder to keep up the walls. Later, the dissolution of the monasteries may have caused loss of local expertise with consequent wall breaches that were not repaired for decades e.g. at Lesnes Abbey (Plumstead and Erith).

These were violent incursions of water, not smooth increases. The walls were rebuilt a step higher and stronger, accordingly.

Quite often, inned lands were abandoned permanently to the river and reverted to salt marsh; they still had value for fishing, willows and reeds (for basket-making, thatching, flooring). "Horse-shoes" are evidence of this. Even on relatively modern maps, "characteristic horse-shoe shaped 'set- backs' reveal where sea or river walls had been breached, and the line of the wall set back around the deep scour hole which had resulted from the movement of water in and out through the narrow gap." Some examples are given below.

==== 1953 North Sea storm surge ====
In the North Sea flood of 1953, the existing defences in London were just adequate to prevent major damage. Further down the estuary, though, the walls were not tall or strong enough: 120 km^{2} of lands were seriously flooded. Accordingly, those walls were raised and strengthened — a minimum height of 18 feet was recommended for agricultural land. The lines of the existing walls were generally retained, although some new walls were built to dam off creeks. However, it was then realised that London was in much greater danger than before. Calculations showed that, if the incident were to be repeated, the surge waters would now be constrained to move further up the river, overtopping London's walls by as much as 20–25 cm. Paradoxically, it was the failure of the downstream walls that had absorbed waters and spared London. While the Thames Barrier project would solve the problem, it would take another 8 years to complete. Consequently, as a precaution, a building programme was instituted to raise Central London's river walls. It was completed by 1973.

=== Encroaching into the stream ===
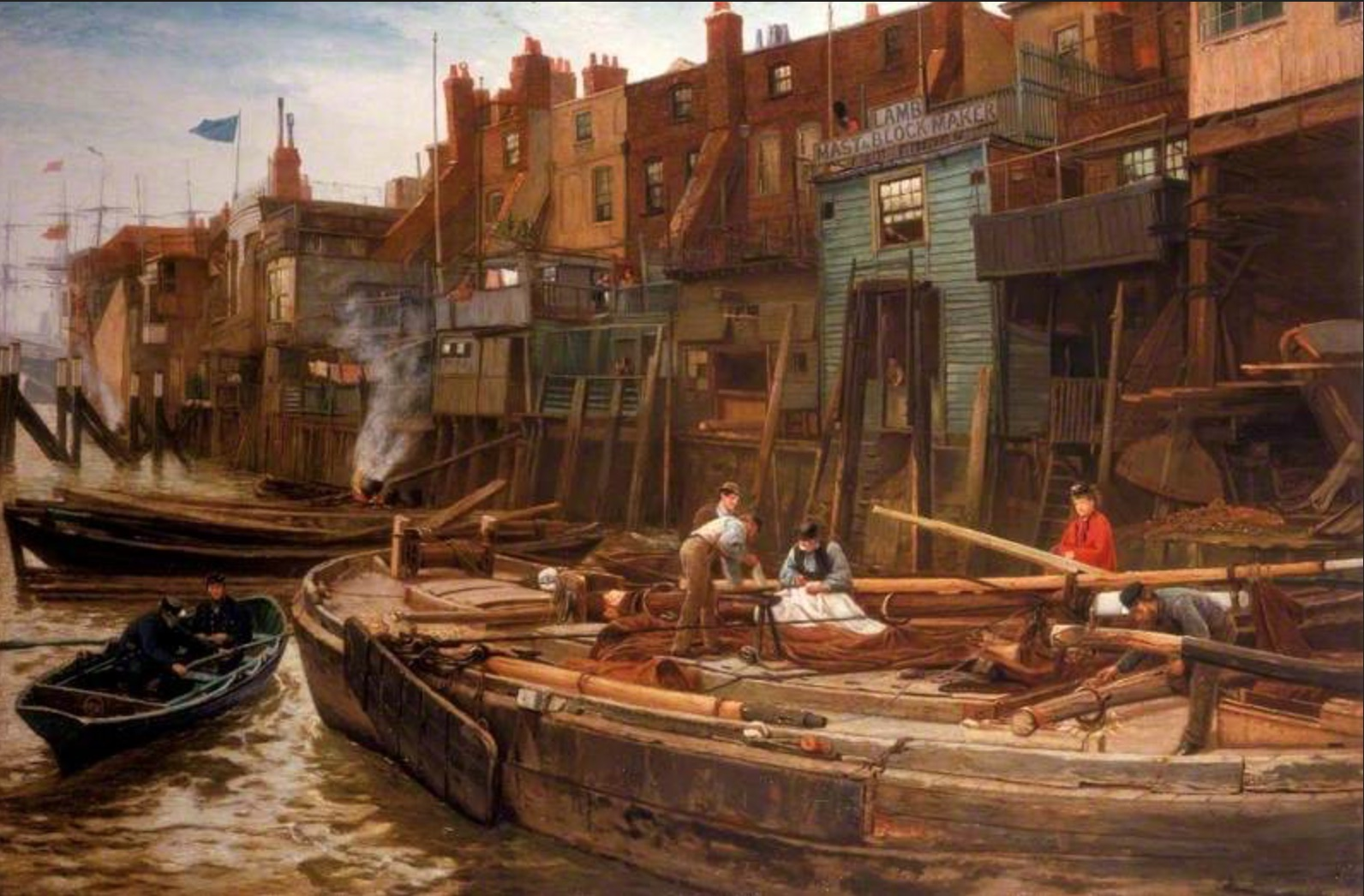
River frontage was valuable property. The Limehouse Barge Builders c. 1880 (Charles Napier Hemy: South Shields Museum and Art Gallery)

Where human activity beside the river was industrial or commercial there was an incentive not only to make banks but to encroach out into the navigable stream. Here the walls were made by making timber revetments and backfilling with rubbish. The process was repeated over time.

River frontage was valuable property. A quay was a prized asset. Passengers and goods were best carried by water, which required river access and landing facilities. In 1658 it was complained that a shoemaker called Jenkin Ellis, who owned just 10 yards of river front, had turned it to account by selling permission to anchor ships ten abreast. River access was convenient for trades that dumped offensive by-products or needed copious water supplies e.g. brewing and dyeing. Other trades that needed river access included barge-building, ship repairing and lighterage. Some retail establishments, such as marine stores and taverns for mariners, benefitted from access to the waterfront.

"As long ago as 1848", wrote Martin Bates, "Sir William Tite had deduced that nearly all the land south of Thames Street in the City of London 'had been gained from the river by a series of strong embankments'." Evidence of such land gain is now commonplace.

Although they have not been investigated very systematically by historians, there were complaints of encroachments into the river. Some said it ought to be illegal; others said it was illegal but law enforcement was slack. One of these, Granville Sharp, said the City's water bailiff, who was supposed to stop these encroachments, would turn a blind eye for "Fees and Christmas Compliments".

Wrote John Ehrman:

One observer reckoned that between London Bridge and Gravesend the wharves and warehouses, with their piers and steps, were covering 300 to 400 feet of new ground during each year of James II's reign... As the waterfront was built over, so the river silted up off the new walls and landing stages, and by 1687 the Navy Board estimated the channel of the Thames had been narrowed by one-fifth by the "new encroachments".

The illustration shows the river front at Narrow Street, Limehouse. Archaeologists believe that Narrow Street represents the line of the medieval river wall, which was originally built for 'inning" marshland. But the brick houses are to the river side of the street, and presumably were constructed by encroaching on the river and reclaiming the foreshore; archaeological excavations have tended to confirm this.

Specific instances are given below.

== Law and administration ==
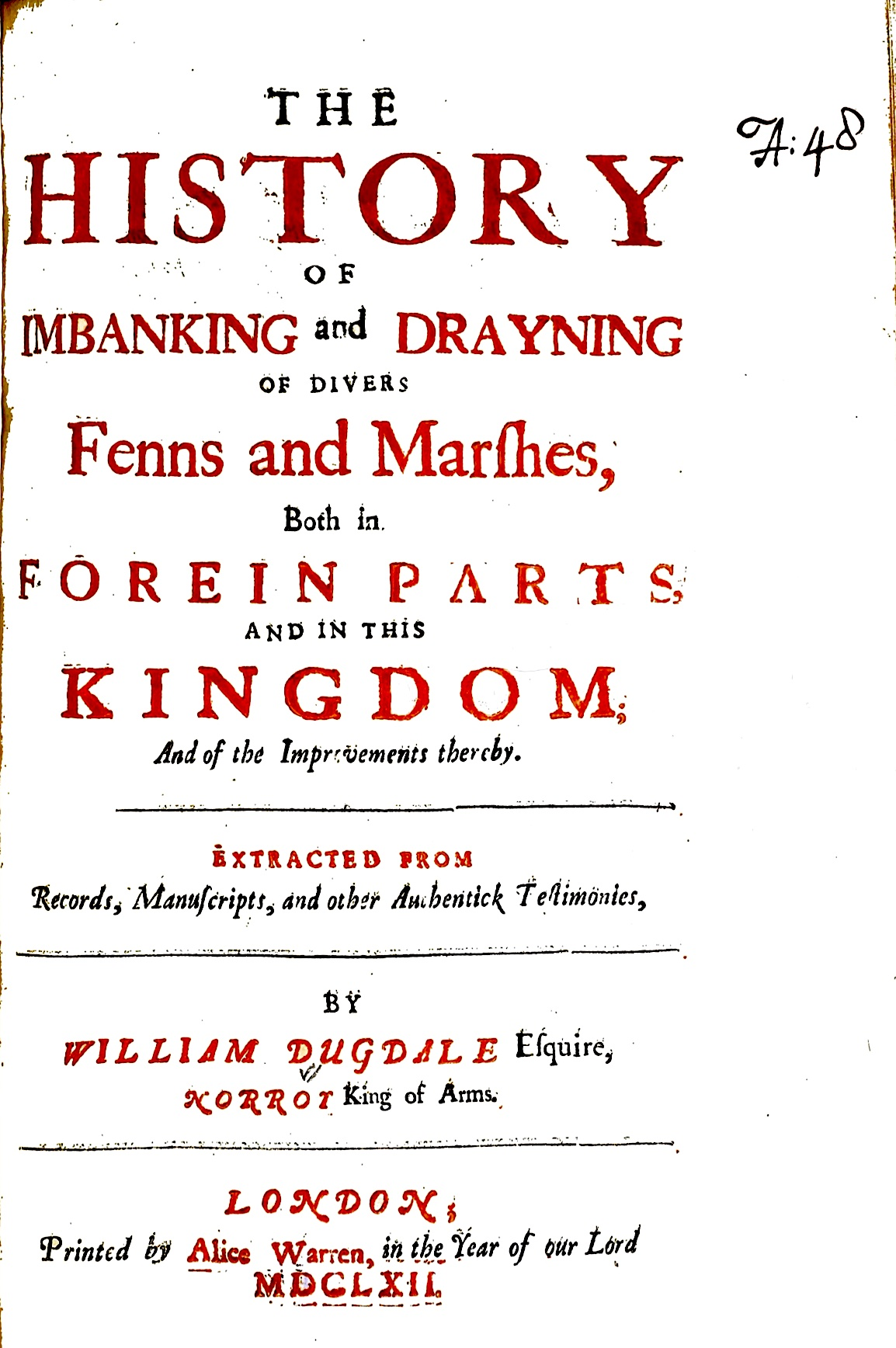
Dugdale's book (1662) was the first to investigate the walls

=== Marsh law ===
The inhabitants of Romney Marsh in Kent were the first in England to establish amongst themselves customary laws about responsibility for keeping up embankments in a cooperative community. Later the judges applied the "custom of Romney Marsh" in other marshlands; thus it became part of the common law of England, including the Thames. A record shows it was already being applied—in Little Thurrock—in 1201.

The fundamental principle was that every occupier of land who benefitted from the existence of a wall was obliged to contribute to the effort of keeping it up, and to do so in proportion to the size of his holding. Disputes were adjudicated by 24 jurats who had sworn to tell the truth and act righteously. A bailiff admonished people to keep up their walls; if they neglected to, he did it himself, and charged them.

Occupiers of down-sloping land that did not benefit from the wall's existence did not have to contribute. (Centuries later, the inhabitants of Hampstead were to use that principle to get off paying sewerage rates.) Thus each level of inned marsh was a separate community or regime.

Because of a controversial interpretation of Magna Carta (next section) the law could not compel people to make new walls, only repair existing ones.

The mutual liability principle applied in cooperative communities only. In Hudson v. Tabor (1877) the defendant neglected to keep up the height of his wall. There was a very high tide, it overflowed his wall, and the floodwaters ran onto his land—and his neighbour's too, causing damage. The Court of Appeal ruled he was not bound to compensate his neighbour for the loss. This was because there was no pattern of cooperative behaviour by which each person bore his proportionate share of the cost of upkeep: in this district, each frontager looked after his own. By not establishing a cooperative regime the neighbours chose to run the risk.

Marsh law had many aspects about using the common resource for the benefit of all. Chicago-Kent law professor Fred P. Bosselman argued that marsh law ought to guide decisions of American state courts on wetlands use.

=== Administration ===
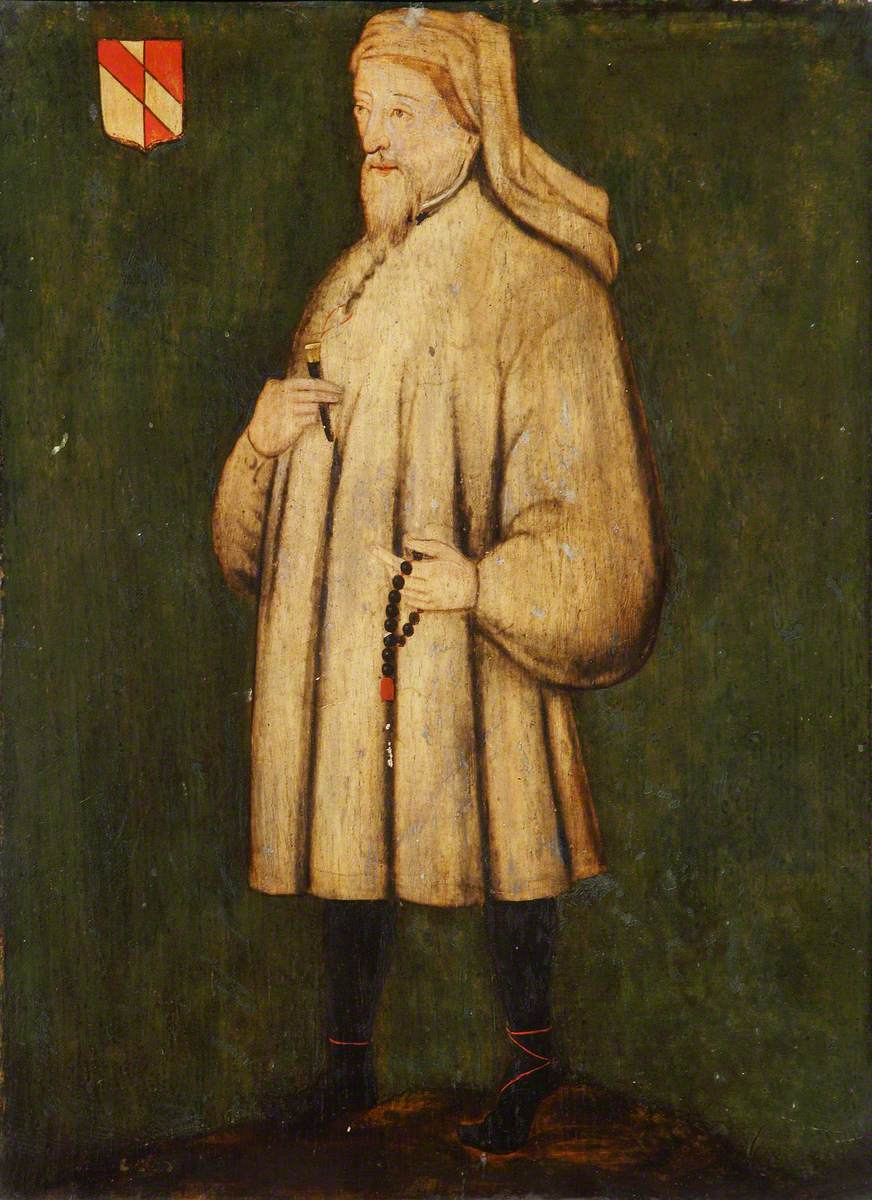
Geoffrey Chaucer, responsible for Thames walls (National Trust Images)

Sometimes local communities were overwhelmed or defeated e.g. by storm surges, or internal dissensions, and needed help to repair the walls. It was the duty of the king to protect his realm from attacks and this included the violence of the sea. The English kings took to sending out commissions to repair the walls and settle disputes. These commissioners had emergency powers: they could make laws, collect taxes, adjudicate disputes and impress labour.

Their descent on a district could cause resentment, however, especially if they compelled local people to make or pay for new walls. Hence (although this interpretation is controversial) Magna Carta provided:

(15) No Town nor Freeman shall be distrained to make Bridgęs nor Banks, but such as of old time and of right have accustomed to make them in the time of King Henry our Grandfather.

(16) No banks shall be defended from henceforth, but such as were in defence in the time of King Henry our Grandfather; by the same places, and the same bounds, as they were wont to be in his time.

Because the most important point concerned land drainage, these bodies came to be called Commissioners of Sewers. (A sewer was simply a rainwater ditch for draining land. The word acquired no "sanitary" connotation until after 1815, when it was first made legal, and then compulsory, to discharge human waste into London's sewers instead of in cesspits. )

An example is Geoffrey Chaucer, who in 1390 was appointed to a commission sent to survey the walls between Greenwich and Woolwich, and compel landowners to repair them, "showing no favour to rich or poor". The commission had power to sit as Justices according to "the Law of the Marsh". Chaucer while on these duties lived at Greenwich, where he was writing his Canterbury Tales.

Eventually, the Statute of Sewers 1531 of Henry VIII made these commissions permanent. They existed in all parts of England. In 1844, a legal expert, speaking of the sewers of London, said "the metropolis is at the present moment, in the eye of the law, under the ancient and approved drainage laws of the Marsh of Romney in Kent". The Commissioners continued to exist until 1930; their detailed records are a rich resource for historians.

Thus, although the vernacular embankments of the Thames were erected by local initiative, once made their maintenance was mandatory in law. Further, as tidal levels increased the Commissioners of Sewers ordered the walls to be raised; landowners who neglected to do so were fined.

== Some instances ==
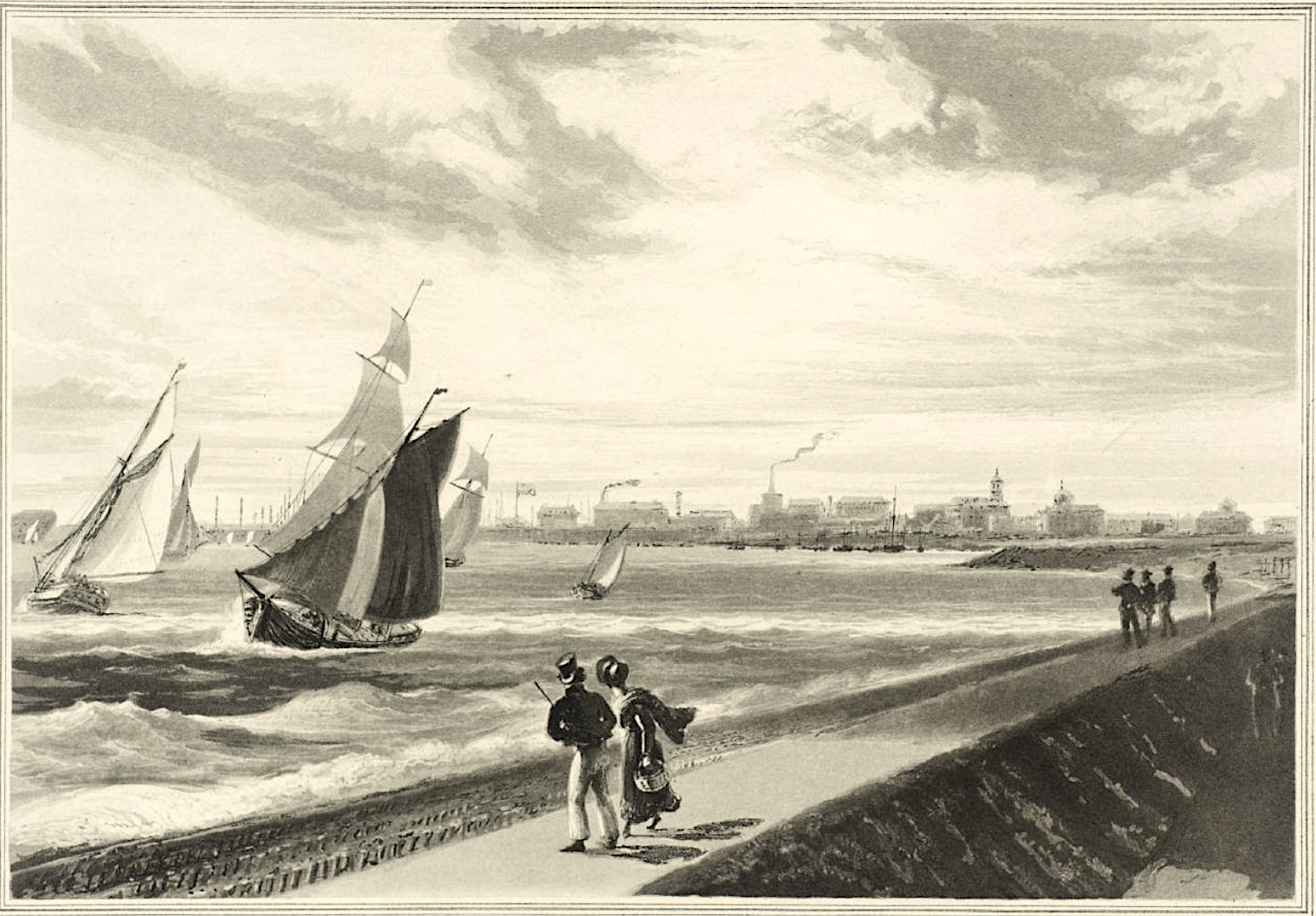
Sheerness, c. 1813 (William Daniell, Tate Britain)

No systematic record of the Thames walls has been kept, except perhaps those of the present day, and they are unpublished. The resources available to the historian are casual and sporadic.

Old maps can reveal the walls (and the essential drainage ditches) but the detail is poor until Joel Gascoyne's survey of East London of 1703.

Foreshore archaeology, where permitted, has yielded valuable clues, particularly in the City of London, Southwark, Wapping, Shadwell and Limehouse. Further upstream the clues may have been obliterated by the Victorian Embankments.

Placenames offer hints e.g. Blackwall; Millwall; Bankside; Wapping Wall; "the name Flemingges wall in 1311 attests how early foreigners were employed here [Erith]".

Artworks may be records, especially of West London, though because of artistic licence caution is needed.

Legal records go back far, though not to the time the walls were first built. The science of geology allows an understanding of what was desirable and feasible.

There may never be a comprehensive history of the Thames walls. The following are some instances.

=== City of London ===
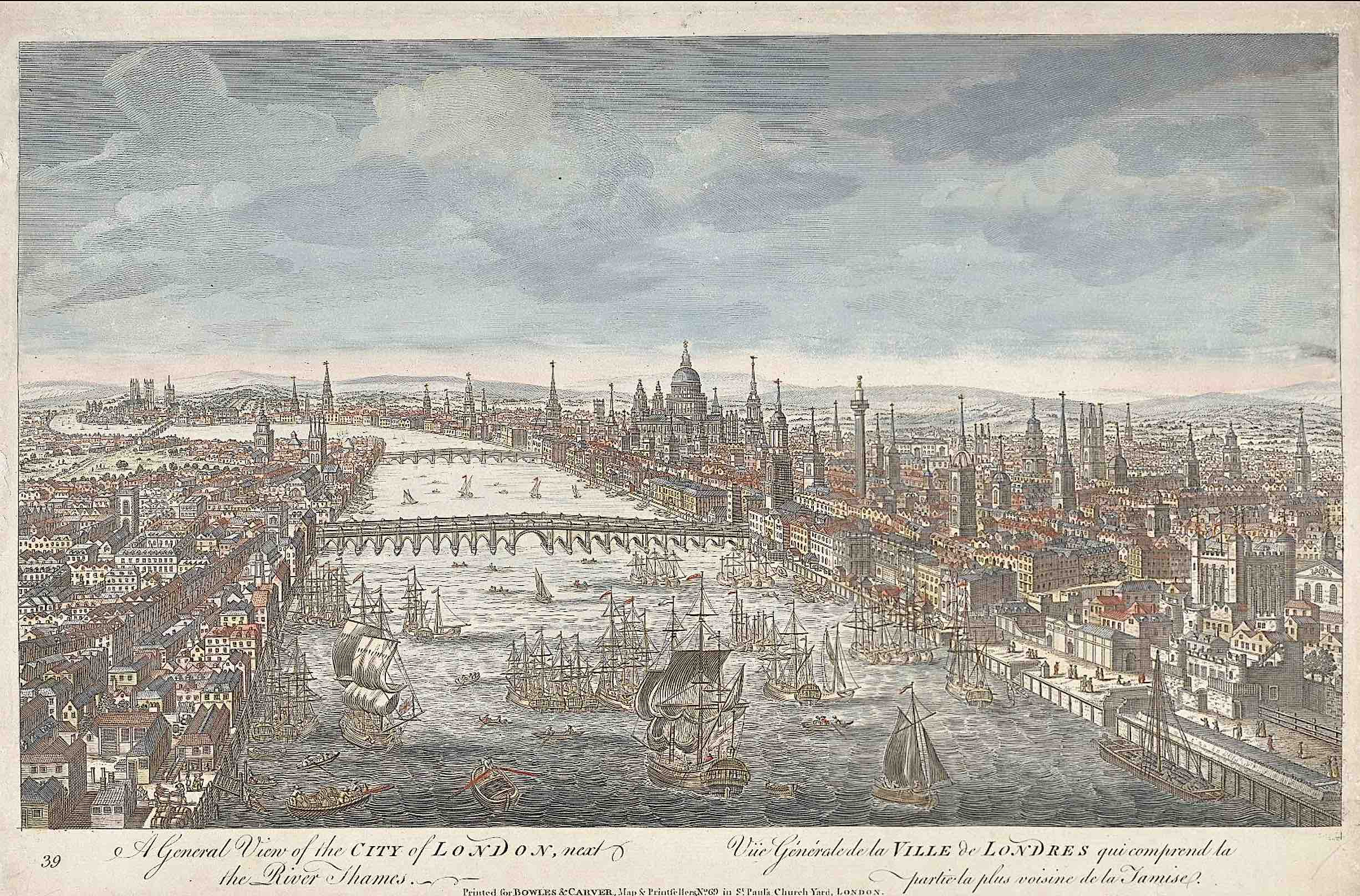
A General View of the City of London, next the Thames c. 1770 (Unknown artist: Yale Center for British Art)

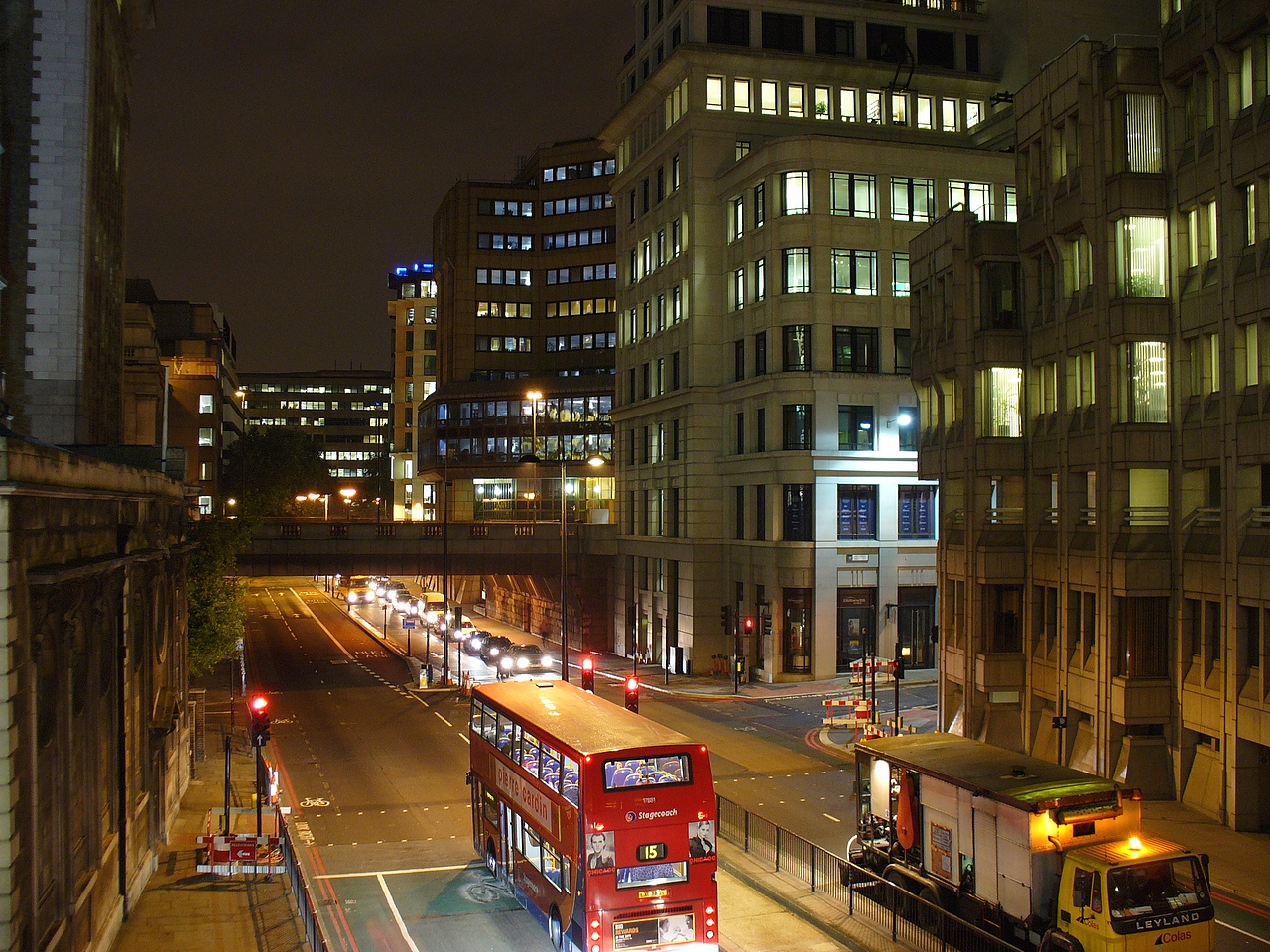
Lower Thames Street today, no river in sight, but a bustling waterfront in Roman times

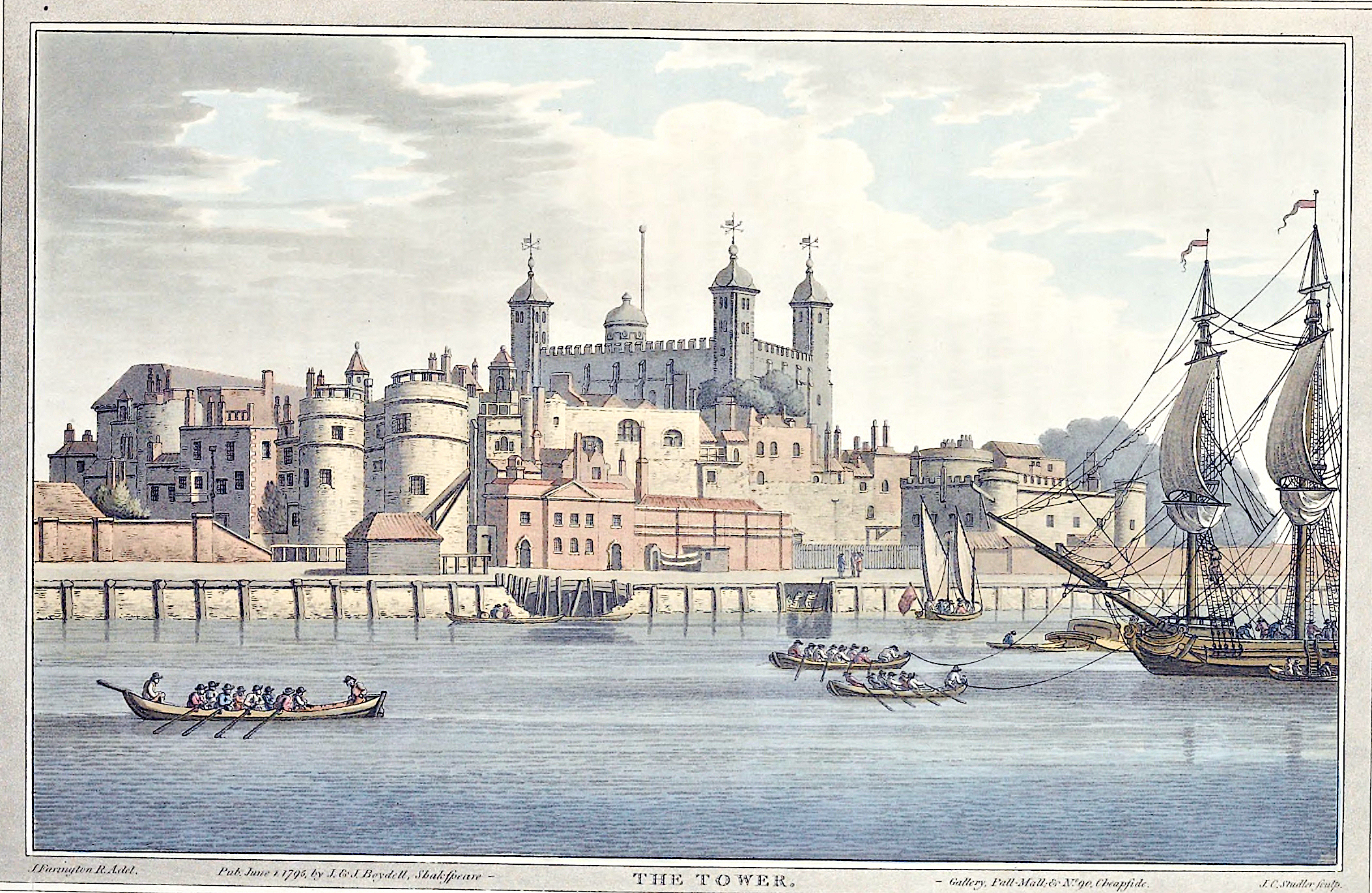
Tower of London, 1795 (Joseph Farington, Getty Research Institute)

The City of London's Thames as depicted by 18th-century artists has a generally uniform waterfront with elevated embankments (see illustration). But this was a constriction of the natural river.

From 1973 onwards, said Gustav Milne, rescue digs were regularly undertaken along the London waterfront.

This long-running rescue archaeology programme was full of surprises. To begin with, it was discovered that the river bank in the first century AD did not lie below the modern quayside, but some 150 m to the north.

In a later paper:

It has now been shown that all the land to the south of Thames Street has been reclaimed in a piecemeal manner from the river, starting in the Roman period and continuing from the tenth to the fifteenth century. Each extension was usually achieved by the erection of a timber revetment upon the foreshore, behind which was dumped an assortment of domestic or other waste, sealed by the surfaces of the yards or buildings laid out over the newly-won land. The mile-long London waterfront thus represents an artificially created tract of land up to 100 metres wide.

The "mile-long" waterfront was the southern limit of the whole of the City of London and ran from the Fleet River in the west to the Tower of London in the east.

Excavations near London Bridge revealed that waterside encroachment, although starting in the Roman era, advanced mainly between the 11th and 16th centuries: a period of 500–600 years. As well as winning land the probable motive was to keep up the harbour and prevent erosion.

At Queenhithe in the 12th century the embanked area was extended south in five stages by nearly 32 m. According to the site's excavators,

extending and improving valuable riverside commercial property appears to have been the main aim, doubtless spurred on by competitive neighbours engaging in similar projects, although rising river levels in the twelfth century would have increased the need to build higher and sturdier waterfronts as flood defences... [T]here appears to have been a cycle of encroachment and reinstatement, suggesting that the owners or tenants often tried to win a few extra centimetres from their neighbours whenever the opportunity arose.

The medieval embankment at the Tower of London has been said to be 700 years old and the oldest functioning flood defence on the Thames. The image, from an engraving first published 1795, shows its embankment under repair, seemingly revealing it had a hollow, timber-and-masonry structure.

Detailed monographs on the Museum of London archeological investigations are available as open access publications; there are external links to these at the end of this article.

=== Westminster and Whitehall ===
In 1342 the walls from around Westminster to Temple Bar were "broken and in decay by the force of the tides"; a commission was sent to view and repair them. (Then, the Strand was the river front—as its name implies.) Thereafter these walls seem to have been built more sturdily since no more physical breaches are recorded by Dugdale; however they were sometimes overflowed by abnormally high tides. Since the area is low-lying the floods were notable. In 1235 the tide rose so high that the lawyers were brought out of Westminster Hall in boats. In 1663—Samuel Pepys said it was "the greatest tide that ever was remembered"—all Whitehall was drowned.

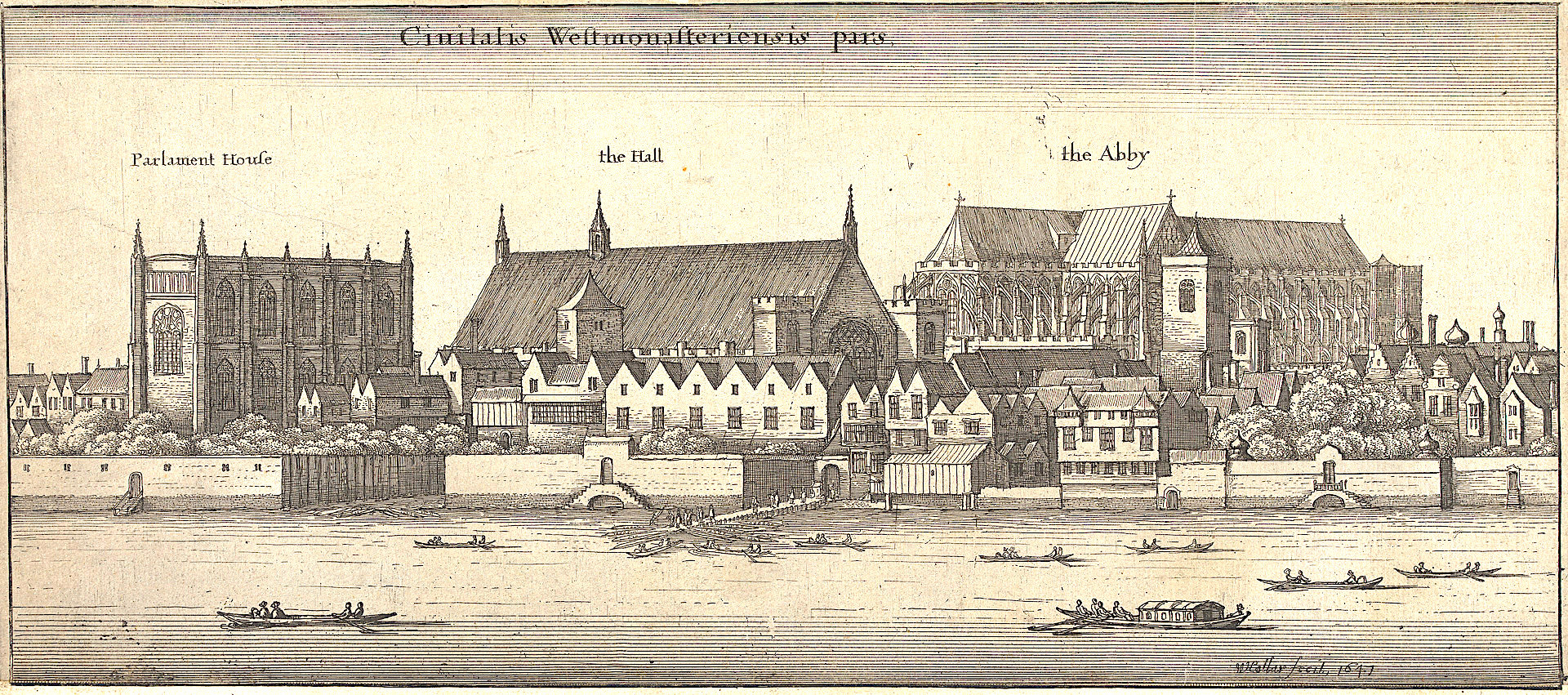
1

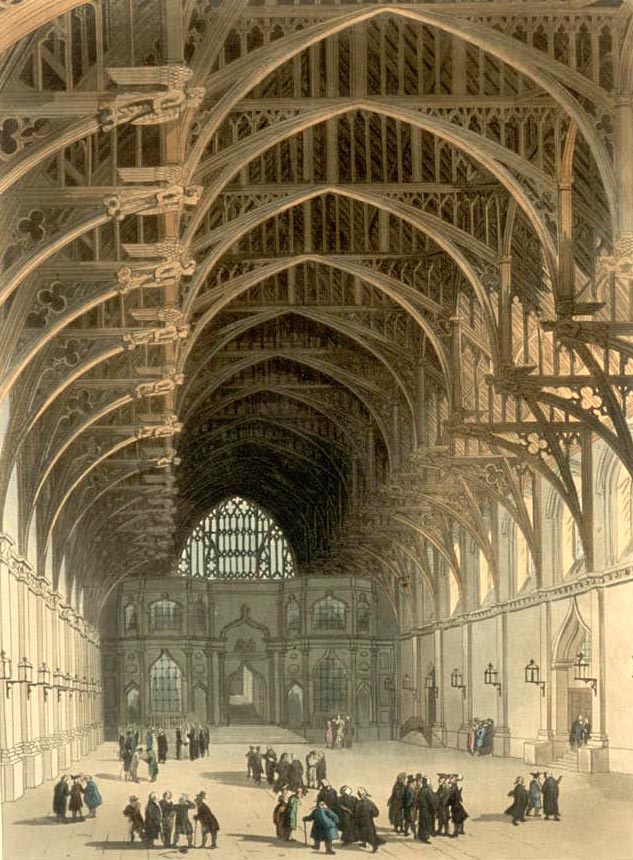
2

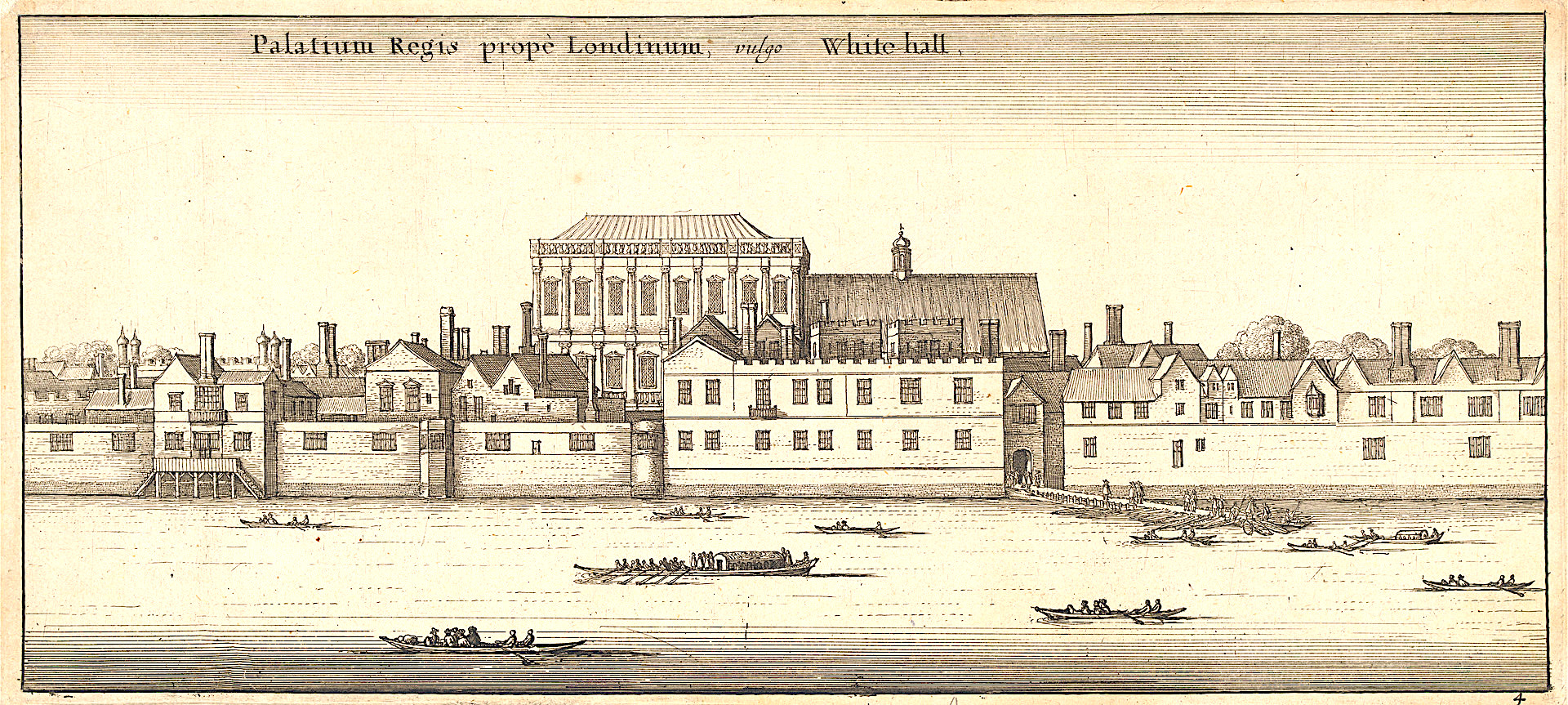
3

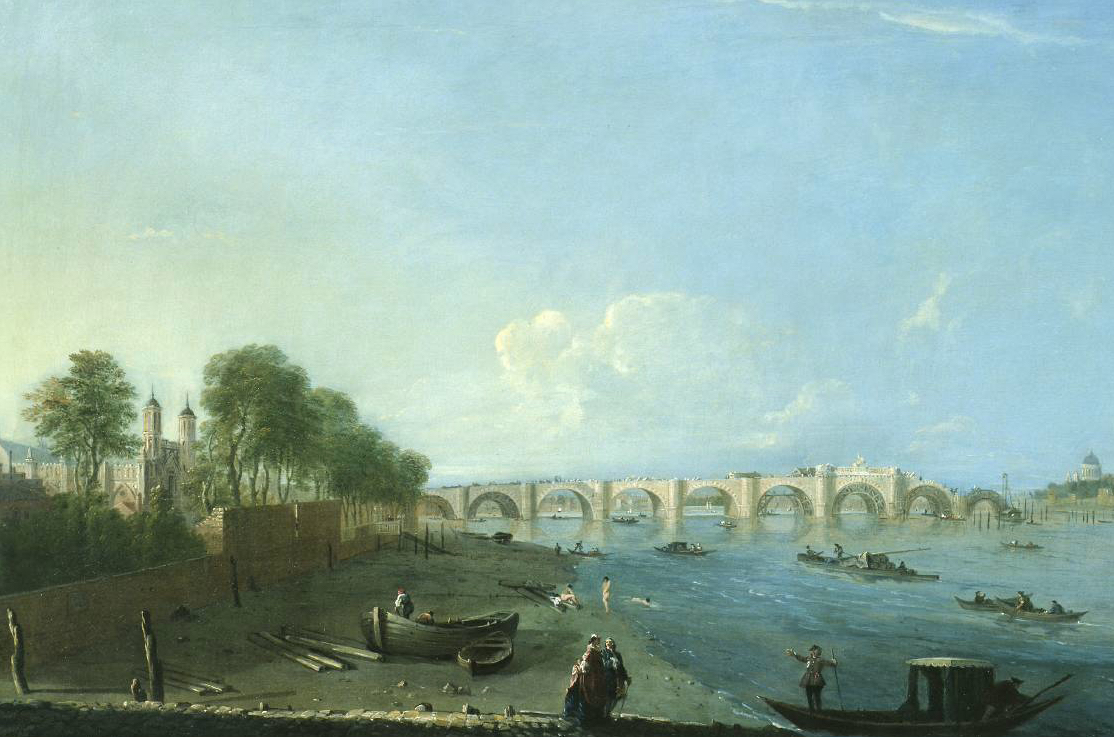
4
1. City of Westminster, 1642. Despite these seemingly robust walls, ultra-high tides went over them (Wenceslaus Hollar: Yale Center for British Art)
2. Westminster Hall, seat of the higher English law courts, could be flooded chest-deep by those tides (Thomas Rowlandson and Augustus Pugin)
3. Whitehall c. 1650. The whole district was drowned in 1663 (Wenceslaus Hollar: Yale Center for British Art)
4. Building Westminster Bridge, 1744. Notice the perfunctory river walls upstream: a disaster waiting to happen (Richard Wilson (detail): Tate Britain)

In 1762 a tide flowed into Westminster Hall covering it to a depth of 4 feet. In 1791 a tide overflowed the banks above Westminster Bridge:

Boats came through the passage of Old Palace Yard from the Thames, and round up to Westminster Hall gate. The two Scotland Yards, Privy Gardens, Whitehall, were under water... Westminster Hall suffered much; the water ran in at the great door for upwards of an hour, and was up to the second step leading to the Court of King's Bench.

=== South Bank ===
==== The medieval wall and Lambeth Marsh ====
A commission was sent to view and repair the banks "betwixt Lambehethe and Grenewiche" in 1295, and again to Lambeth in 1444—this time to provide for its proper governance "according to the Laws and Customes of Romeney Marsh". Lambeth itself was a marsh.

Present-day walkers along Belvedere Road and its continuation Upper Ground, SE1, cannot see the Thames, yet they are actually following the line of the medieval river wall. Already in the Elizabethan era that wall, called Narrow Wall, no longer fronted the river but stood inland, where it served as a causeway through the marsh. Between Narrow Wall and the Thames there was a wide strip of marshy ground overgrown with rushes and willows; this is shown on Norden's map of 1593. The road continued to be called Narrow Wall until the late Victorian era.

A map of 1682 shows that Lambeth, except for the river front, remained open marsh and pasture ground intersected with many drainage ditches. The land was not developed until Waterloo Bridge was built (1817).

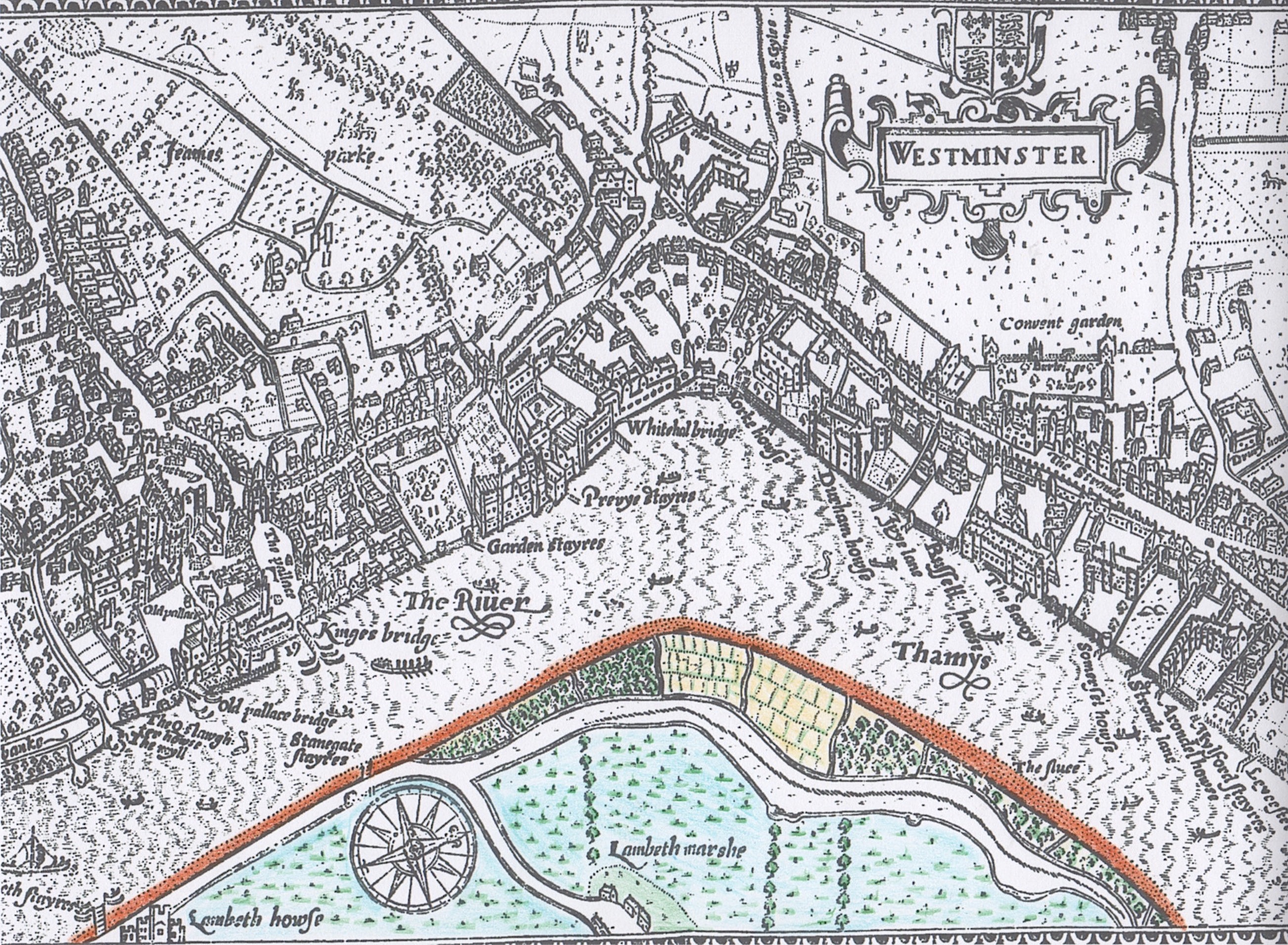
1 Lambeth marsh, Elizabethan map

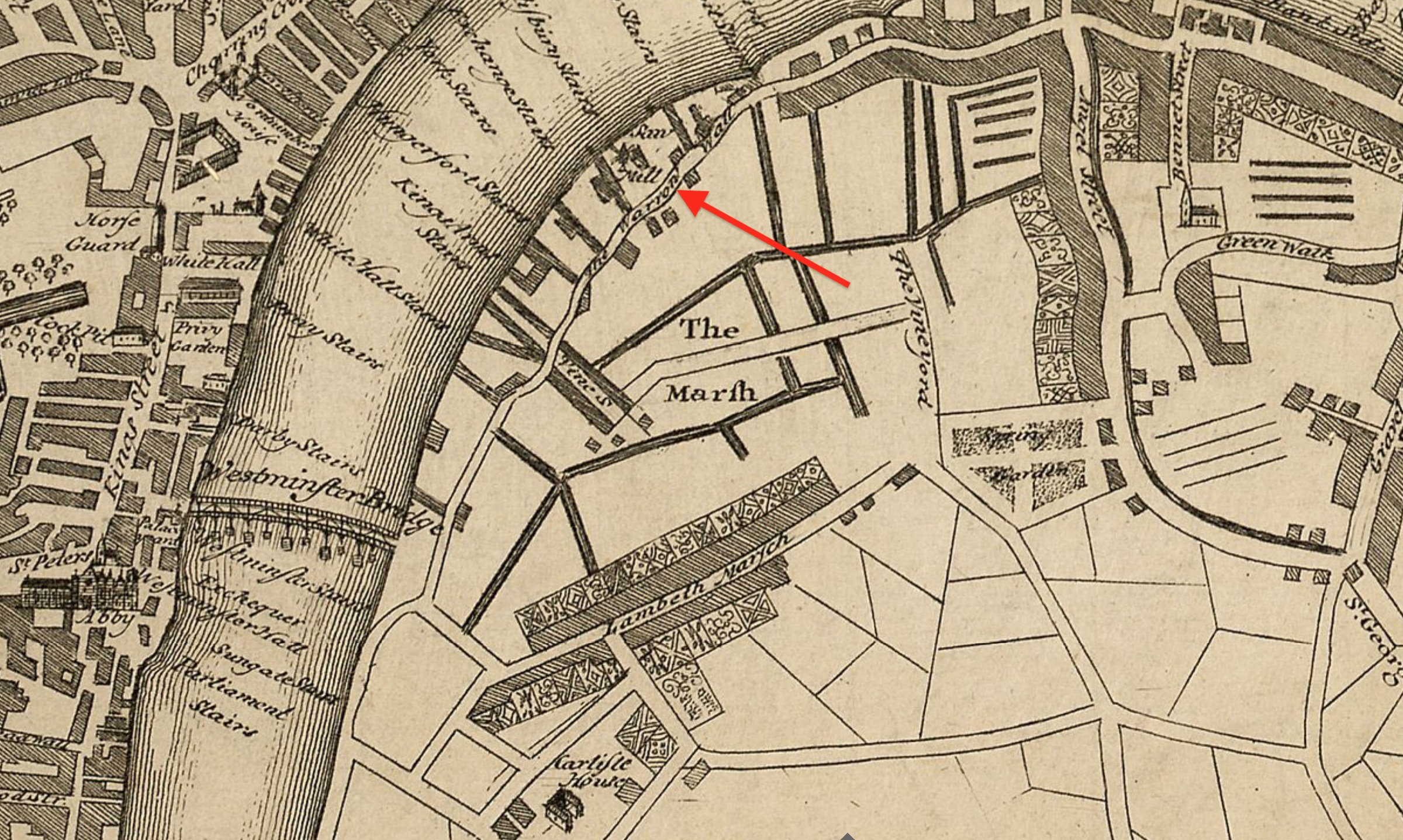
2 Lambeth marsh, mid-18th century

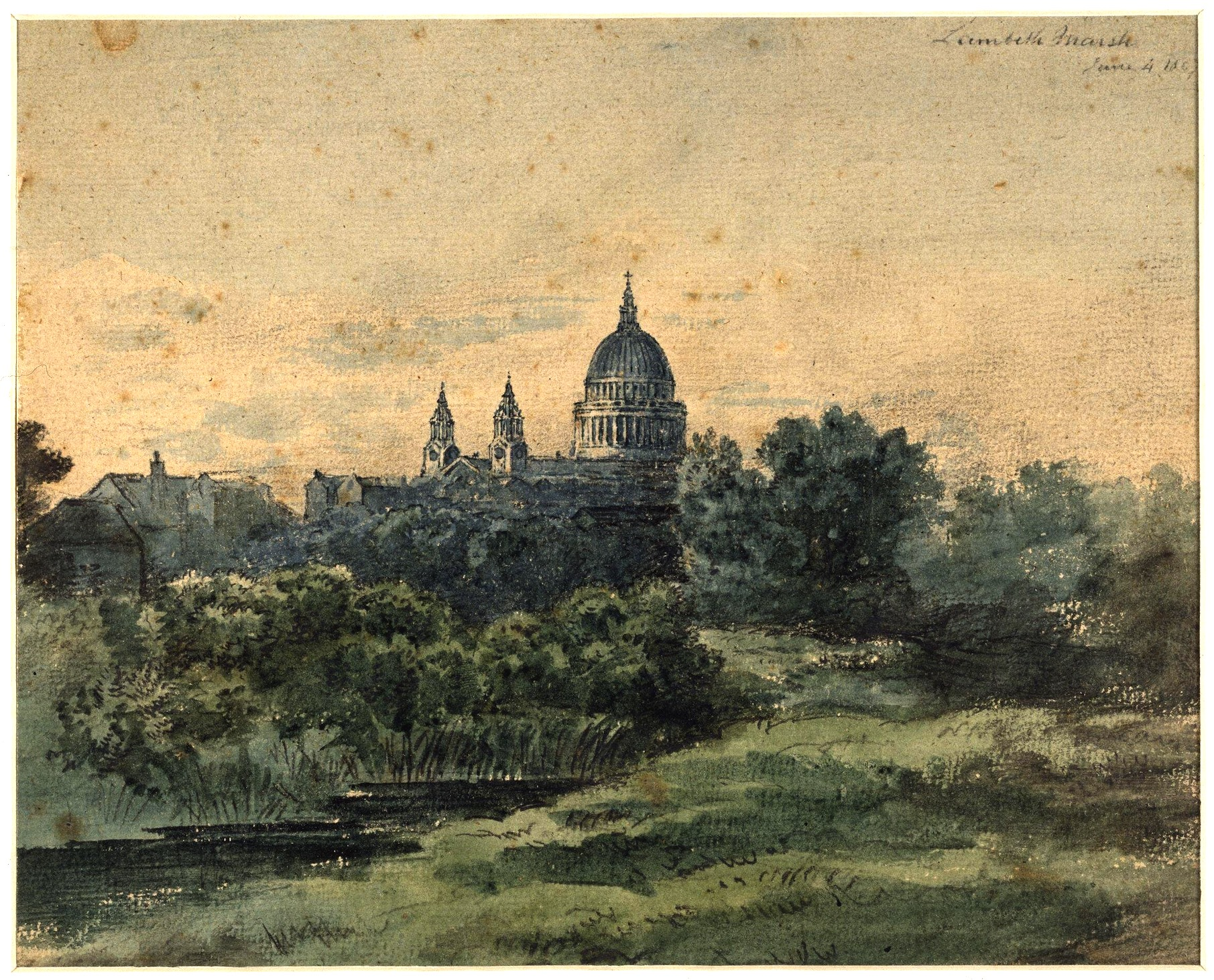
3 1807 watercolour

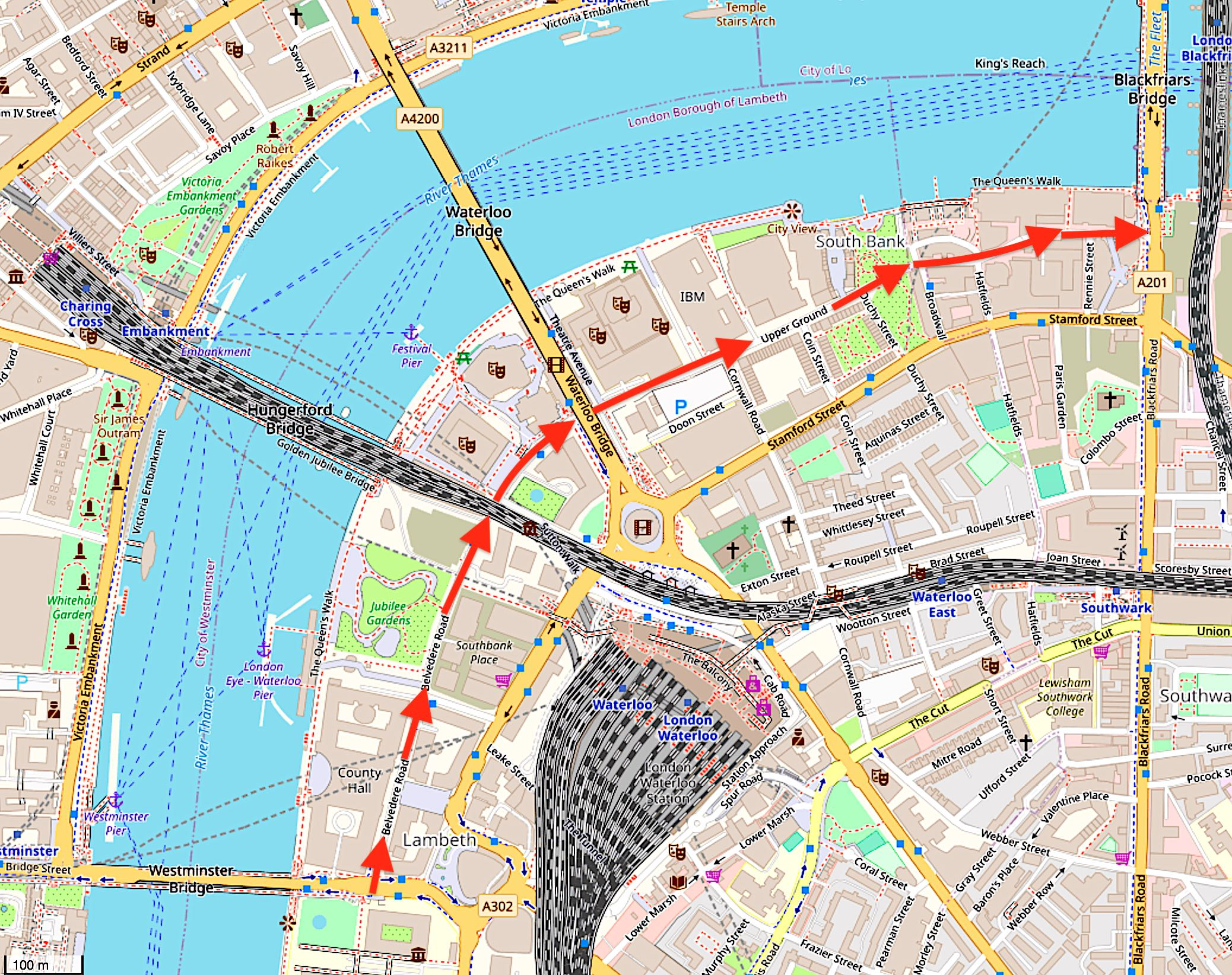
4. Medieval river wall today

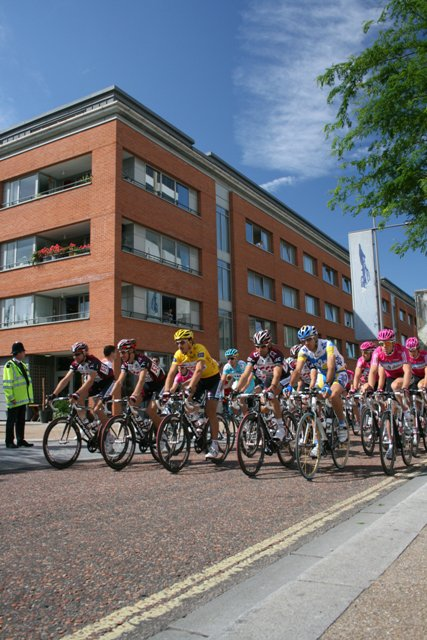
5 In use

1. Lambeth Marsh in 1593. The orange strip is the Elizabethan river wall. The white strips are obsolete river walls, by now standing inland, and include Narrow Wall—today Belvedere Road and Upper Ground, SE1. Notice "The sluce". (Map by John Norden, highlighted detail)
2. Lambeth Marsh about 1740. The roads served as causeways through the marsh; possibly, all were former river walls or counter-walls. The red arrow denotes Narrow Wall.
3. St Paul's Cathedral from Lambeth Marsh, 1807, Patrick Nasmyth, watercolour on paper, Victoria and Albert Museum
4. Line of medieval Narrow Wall shown on the modern OpenStreetMap.
5. Tour de France cyclists riding it (Upper Ground, SE1).

==== The wall as a flood defence, or otherwise ====
1853 A.D.

Q. You are the Rector of Lambeth? A. I am. Q. Are the banks of the Thames adjoining the parish of Lambeth in good repair? A. They are, but they are not high enough; we suffer very much from floods. Q. Do floods frequently occur? A. Whenever we have high tides.

The area was always liable to flooding. In 1242 the river overflowed the Lambeth banks "drowning houses and fields for the space of six miles".

"The surface of this area is mostly below the level of high water", Sir Joseph Bazalgette told the engineering profession in 1865. The traditional sewers were supposed to discharge into the river, but could do so at low tide only. After heavy rains they backed up for days on end: sewage flooded the basements and accumulated in the streets. The area was wet and "malarious". To relieve this, Bazalgette built his Low Level [intercepting] Sewer through the district. Effluent was carried away, not by gravity now, but by steam-powered pumps. He compared the effect of pumping to elevating the whole district by 20 feet.

The Albert Embankment (completed 1868) was not meant to be a flood defence, since it was built on arches to allow vessels to enter draw docks, etc. It was up to riverside proprietors to maintain their river walls, but many failed to make them high enough to cope with unusual tides. They said "What is the use of doing it unless their neighbours do it also?", Bazalgette told the House of Commons. The poor, whose houses stood in the low-lying districts behind, suffered most. Bazalgette saw houses where the water had reached six or seven feet above the floor. "The people were driven out of them into the upper floors". For a few thousand pounds this could have been prevented. Bazalgette's Metropolitan Board of Works sought legal powers to compel them.

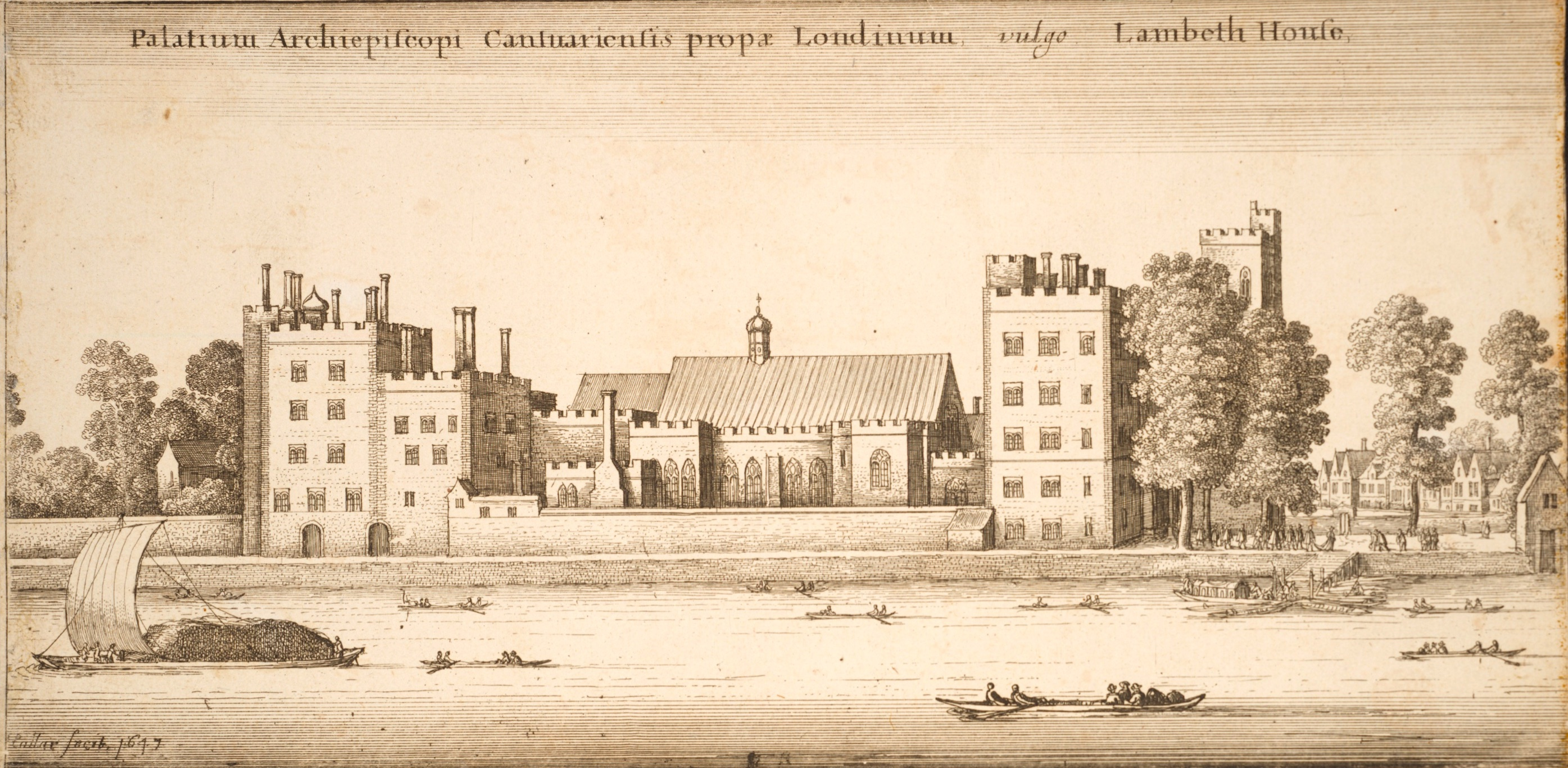
1

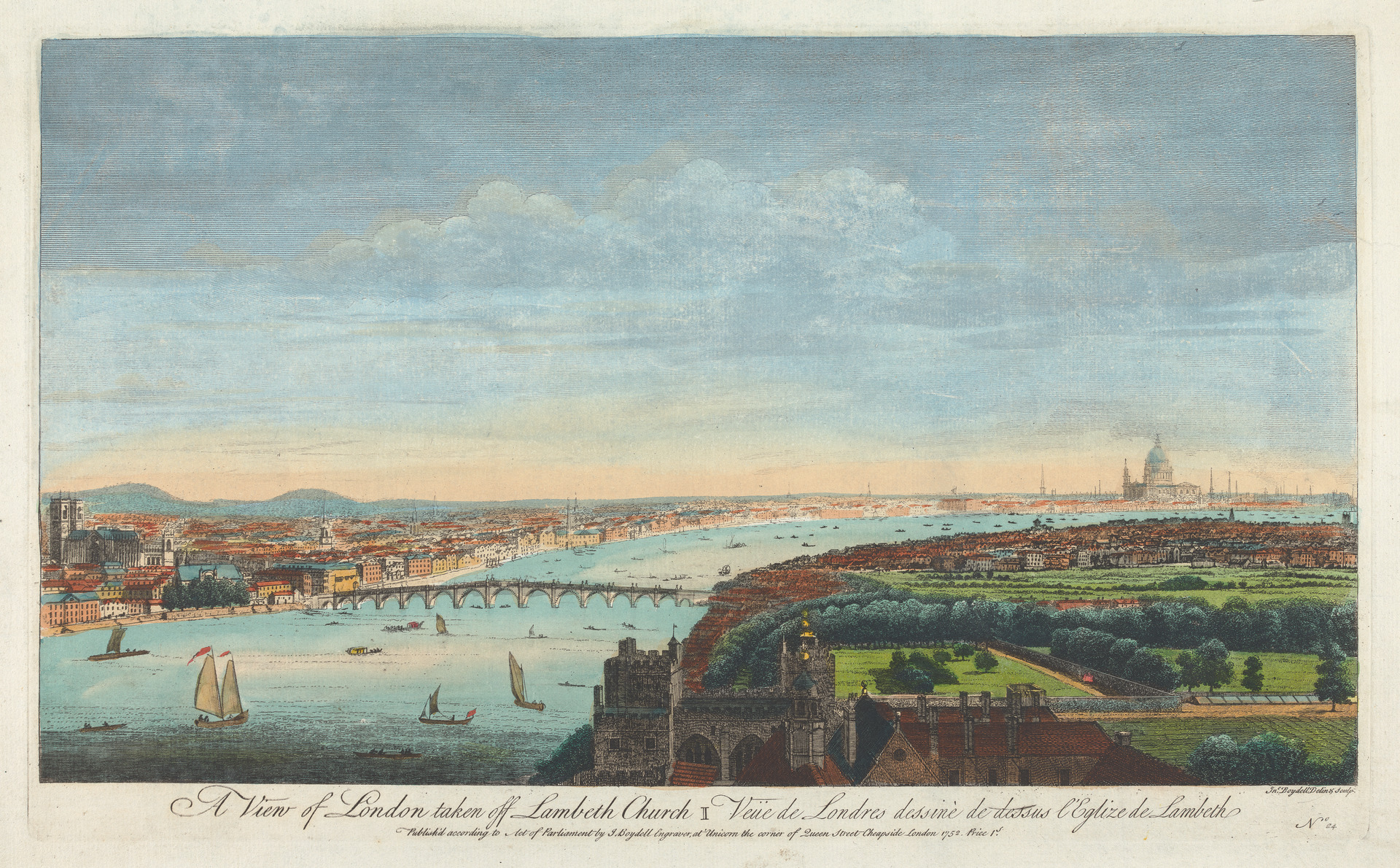
2

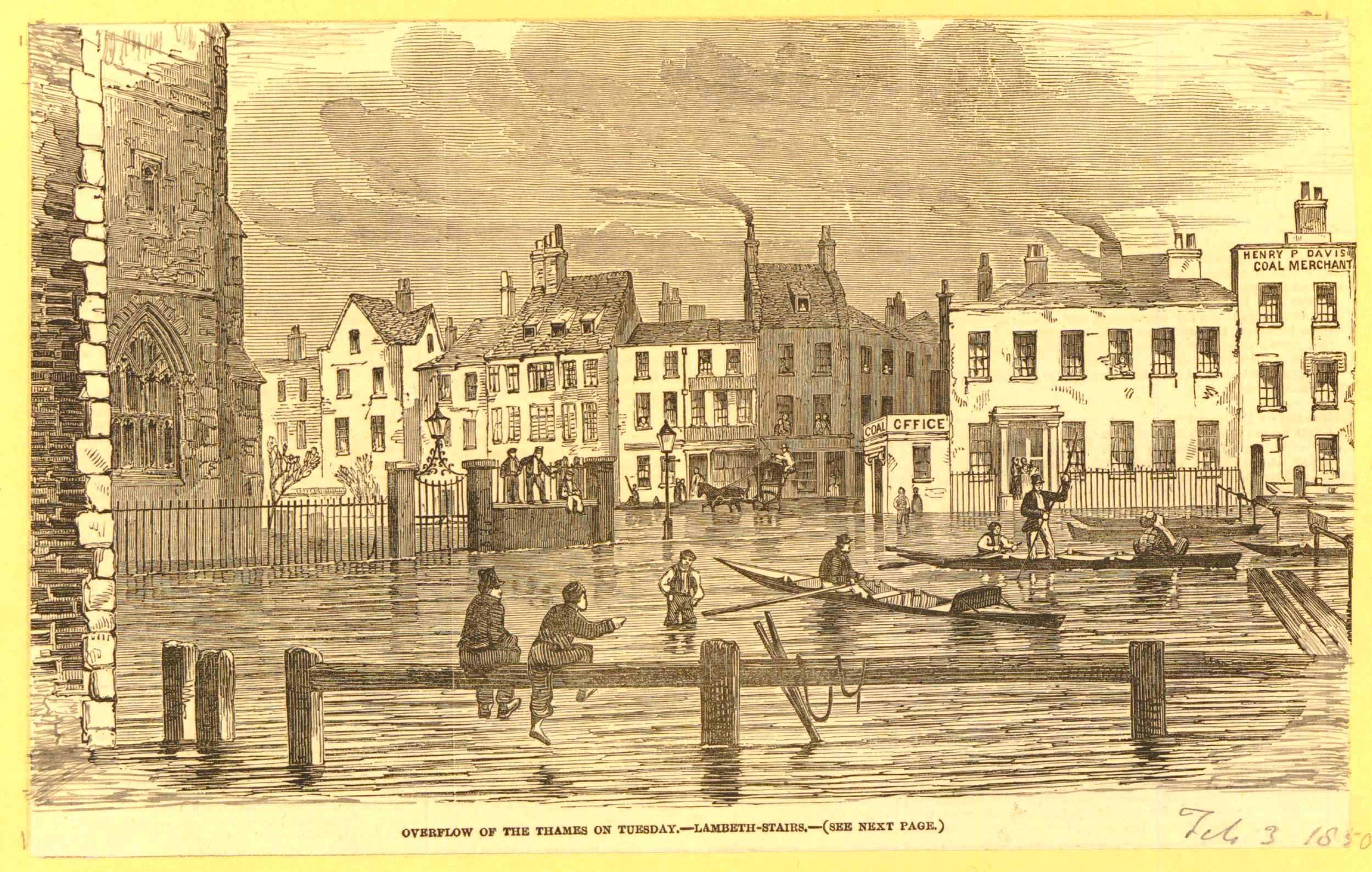
3

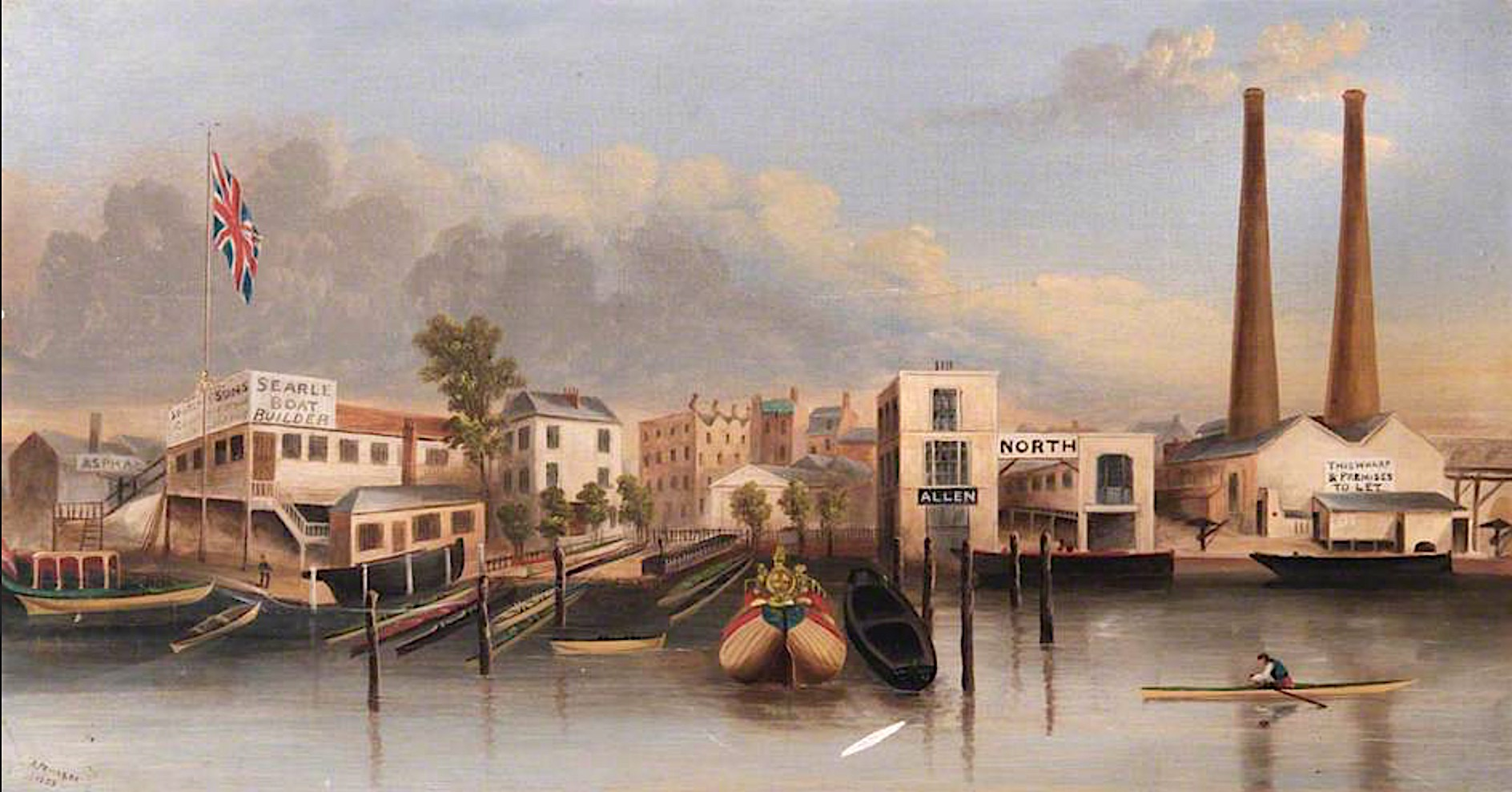
4

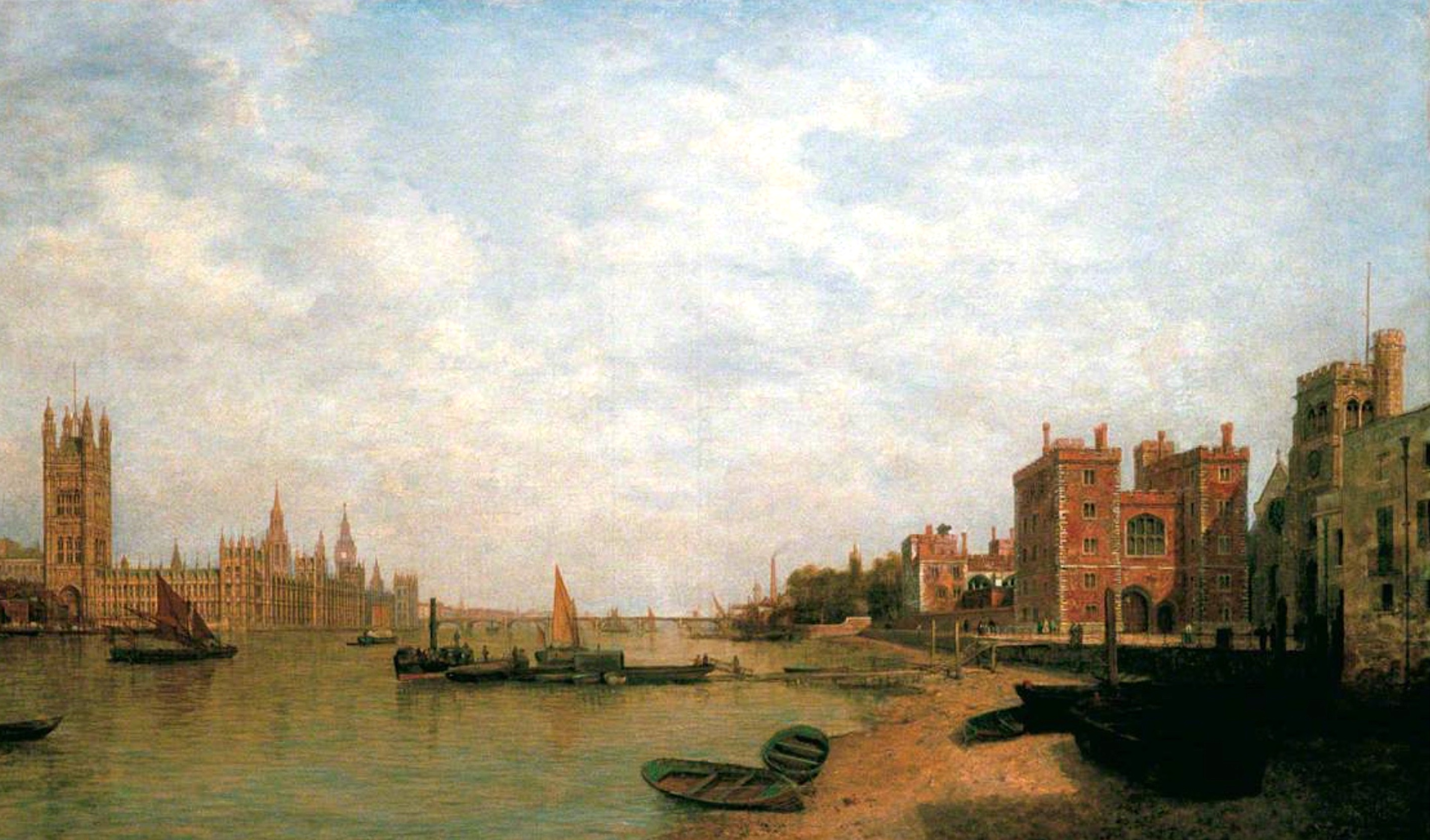
5

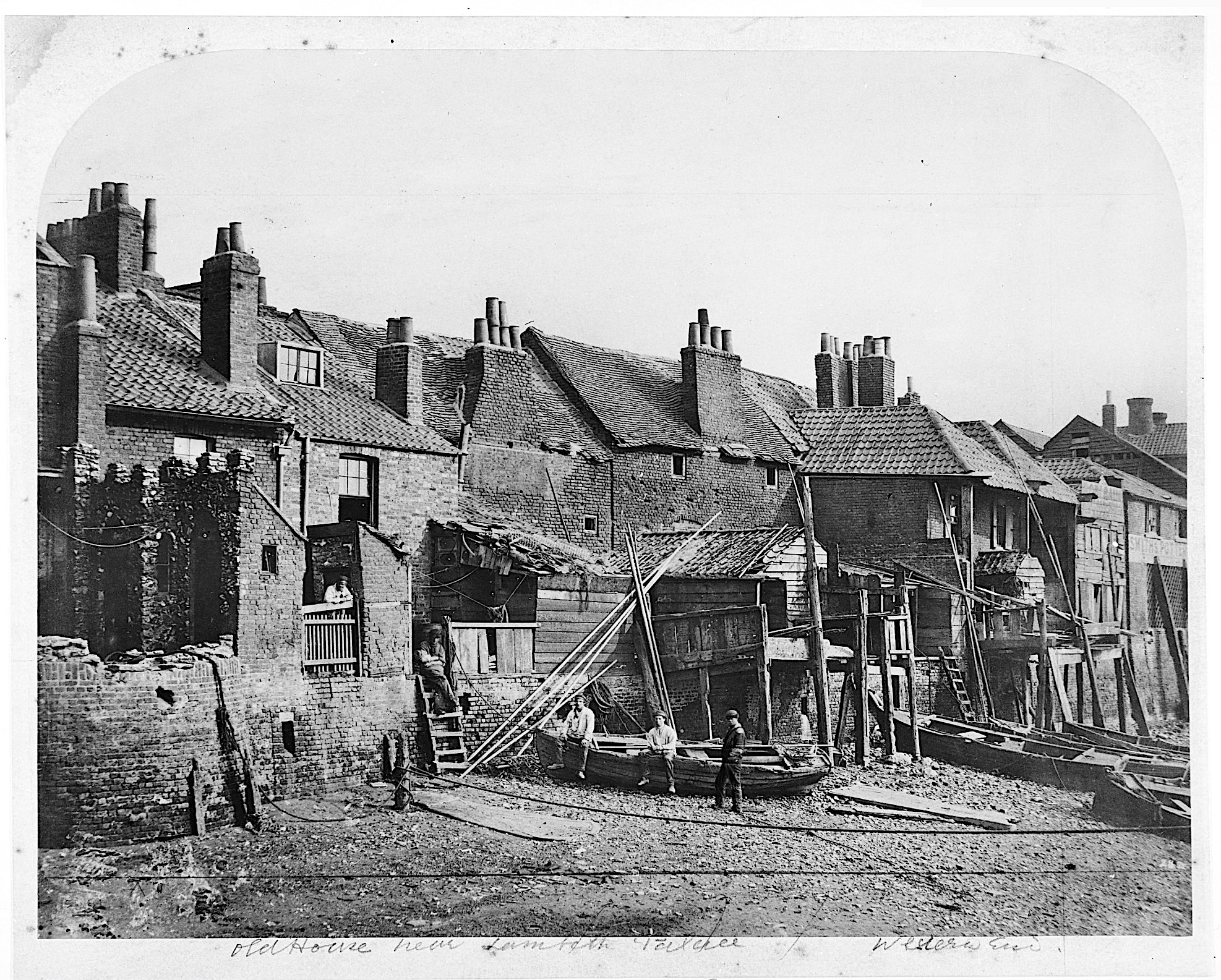
6

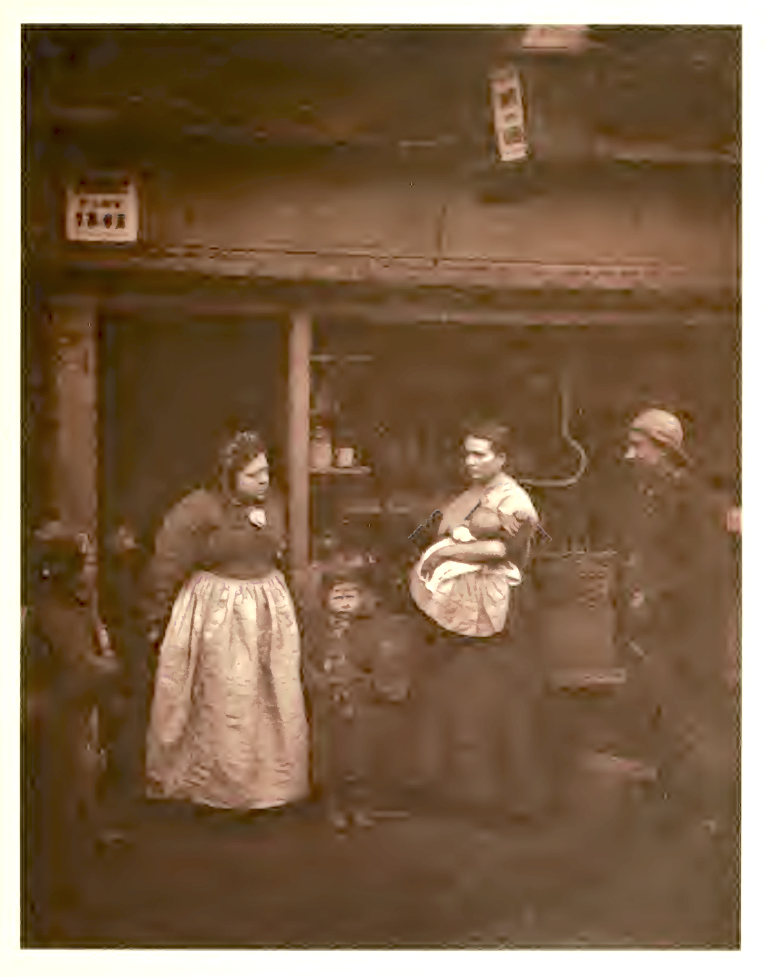
7
1. Lambeth Palace in 1647. Then, a fairly low embankment sufficed. (Wenceslaus Hollar: Fisher Hollar Collection, Toronto)
2. A glimpse of Lambeth Marsh in 1752 (John Boydell: Yale Center for British Art). Caution: trees will not grow on recently drained marsh.
3. Thames overflow, 1850 near Lambeth Stairs (Illustrated London News, 2 February 1850). Lambeth Stairs is shown in images 1 and 5, about where Lambeth Pier is today.
4. Lambeth boatbuilders c. 1853. Boatbuilding, an important local industry, did not go well with high river walls. The boats on Searle's slipway are the Leander Club's: it was their headquarters. City livery barge moored at centre. The site is now St Thomas' Hospital. (Richard John Pembery: Lambeth Archives)
5. Foreshore at Lambeth Palace shortly before the Albert Embankment was made (Henry Pether, 1862, Government Art Collection)
6. Lambeth waterfront 1860-5, low tide. Short ladders suffice to surmount dilapidated river wall. (Unknown photographer: Historic England)
7. Flood refugees, Lambeth, 1877. The Albert Embankment was not designed for flood protection. At unusually high tides poor people were forced out of their homes. (John Thompson, Woodburytype process)

Lambeth was badly affected by the 1928 Thames flood, people drowning in their basements.

For the Festival of Britain (1951) a large expanse of bomb-damaged riverside property was used to make a new embankment wall and create the South Bank.

=== In art: West London ===
The embanking of the Thames in response to the rising tidal head happened too long ago to be captured in art—in most places. But in West London the tide is comparatively recent and, in parts, small even today. Hence pre-Victorian paintings often depict a river with natural banks. Later, modest erosion defences are made, and gradually join up, as in illustrations 5 and 6. The removal of old London Bridge (1834) increased the tide upstream and caused more flooding in the upper districts. Very few papers have been published about the waterfront riverside communities in this area.

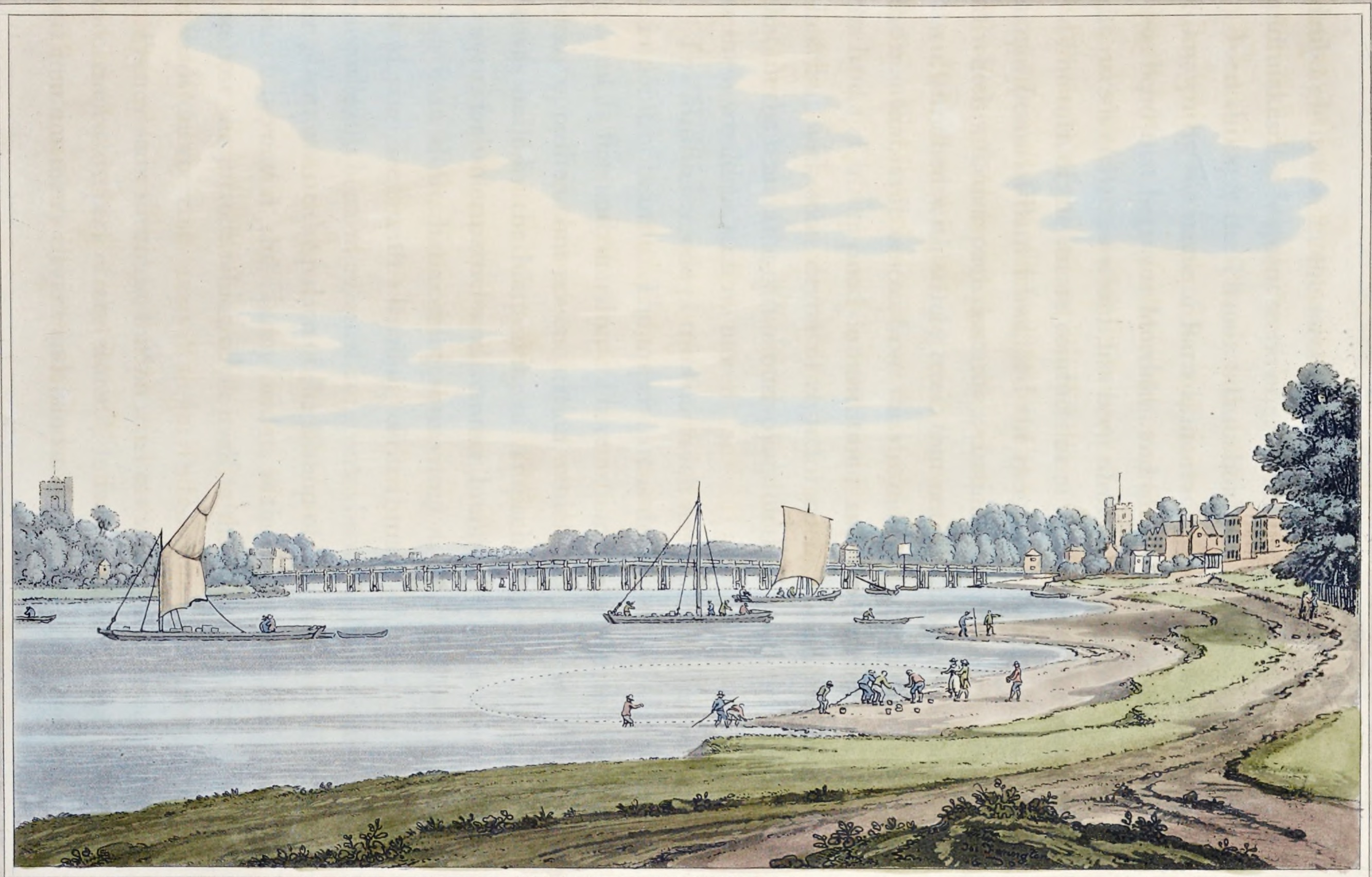
1

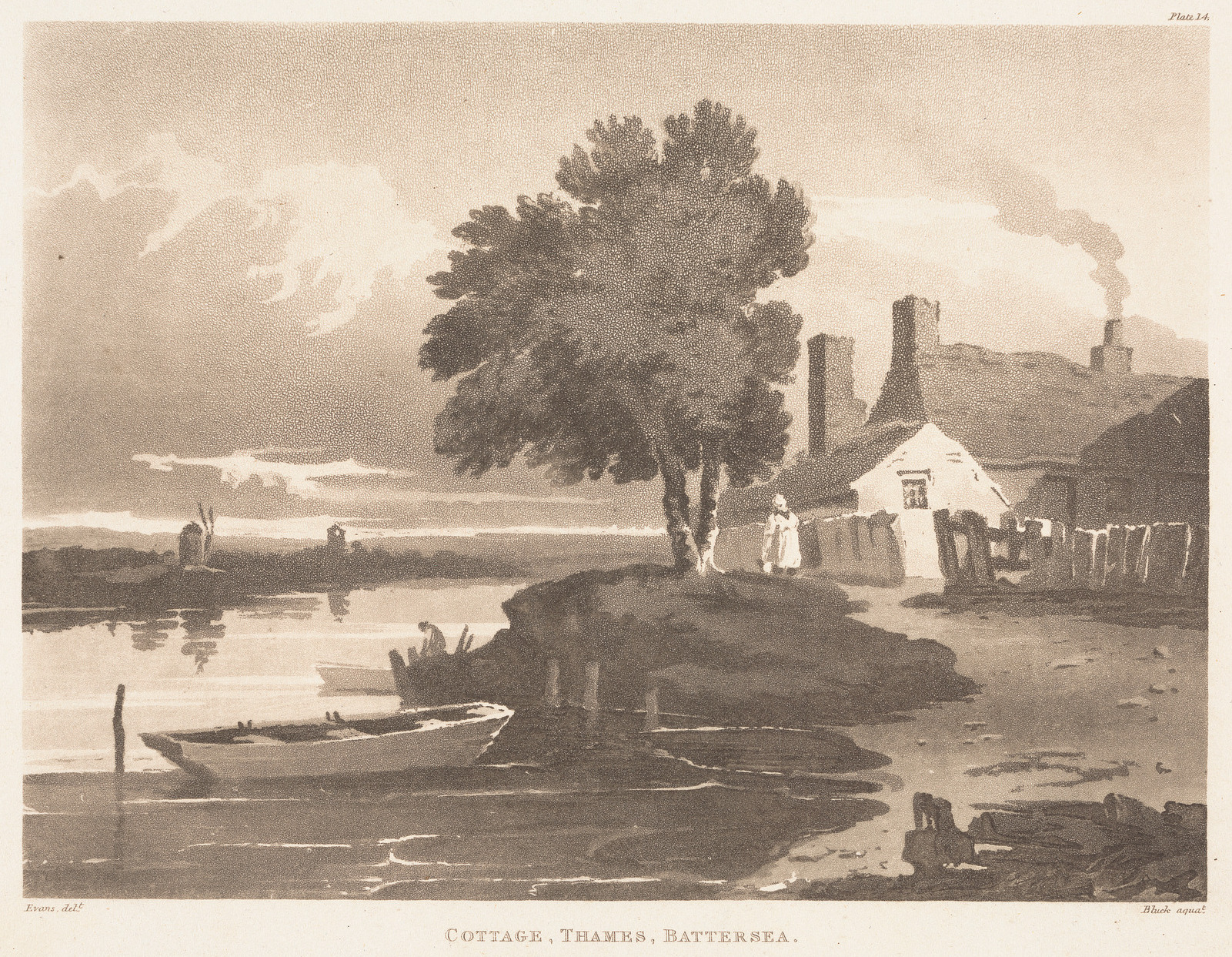
2

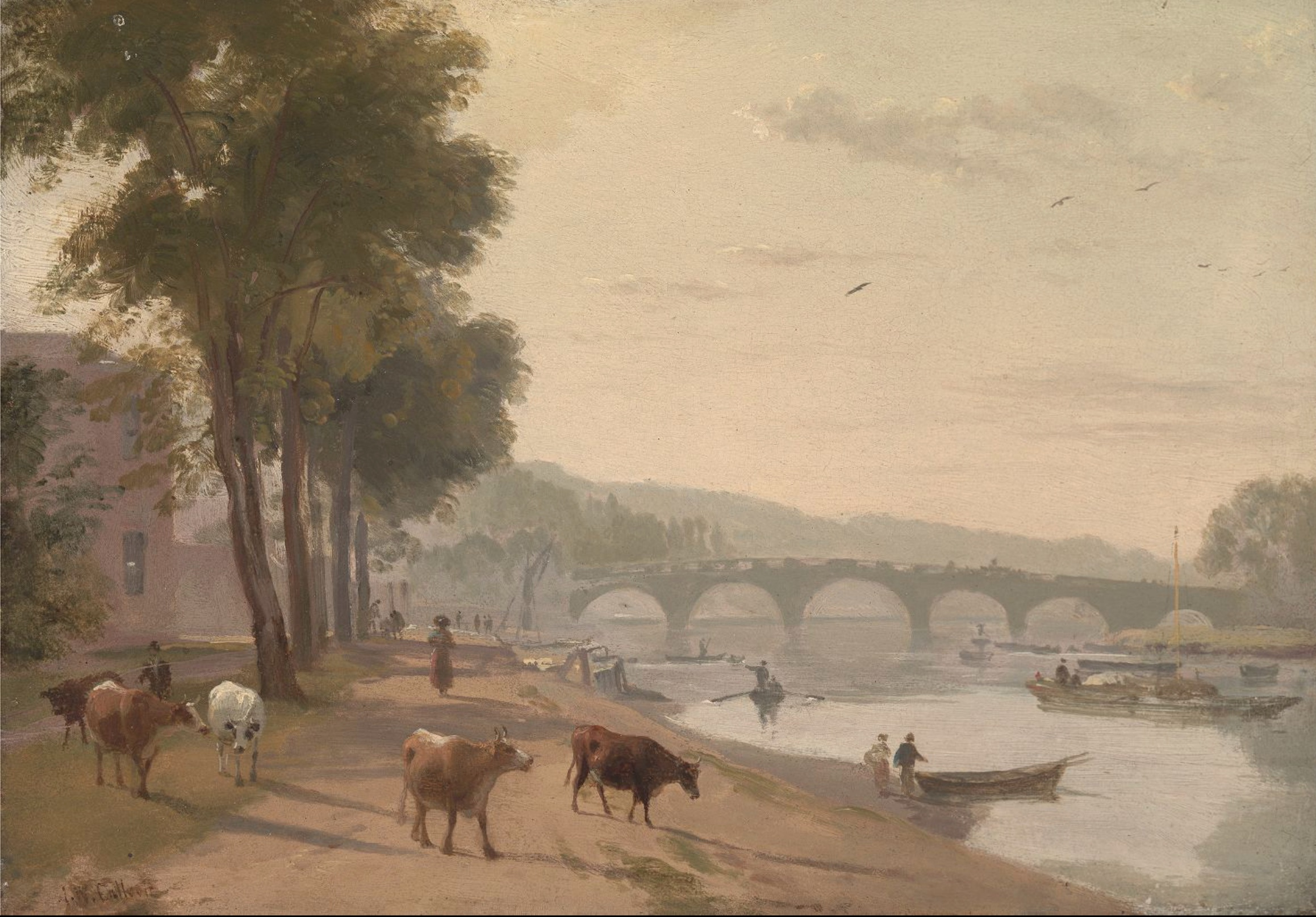
3

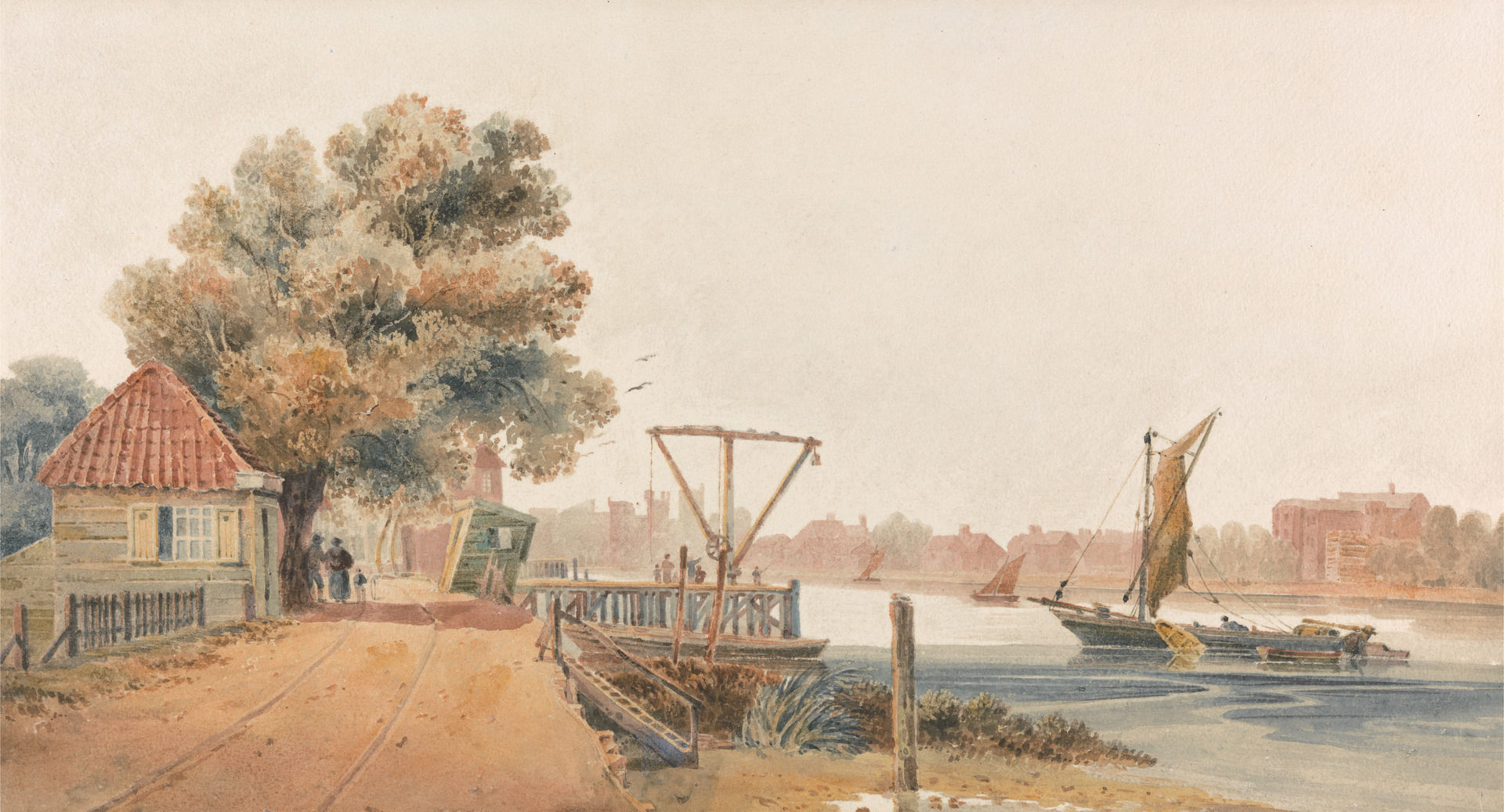
4

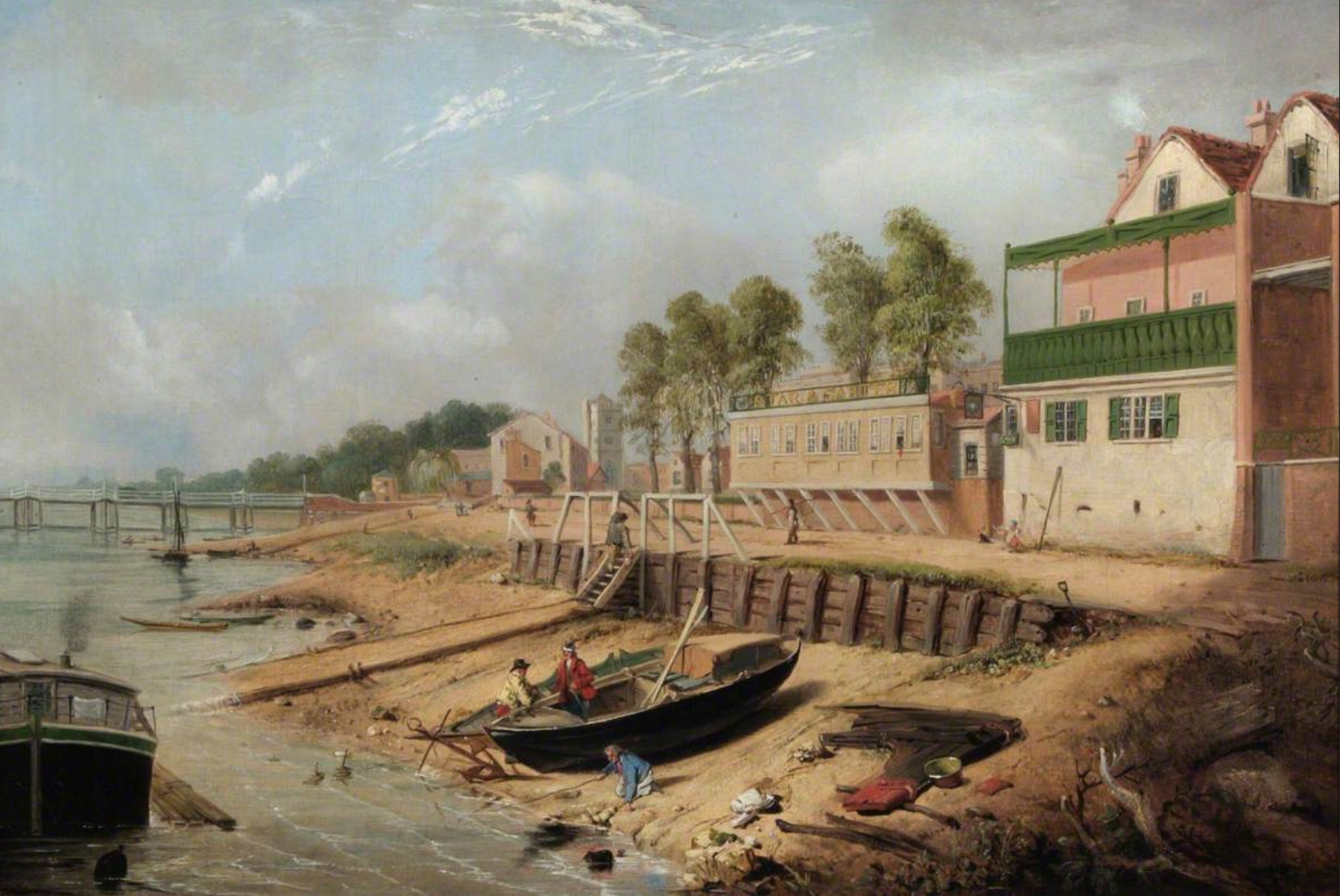
5

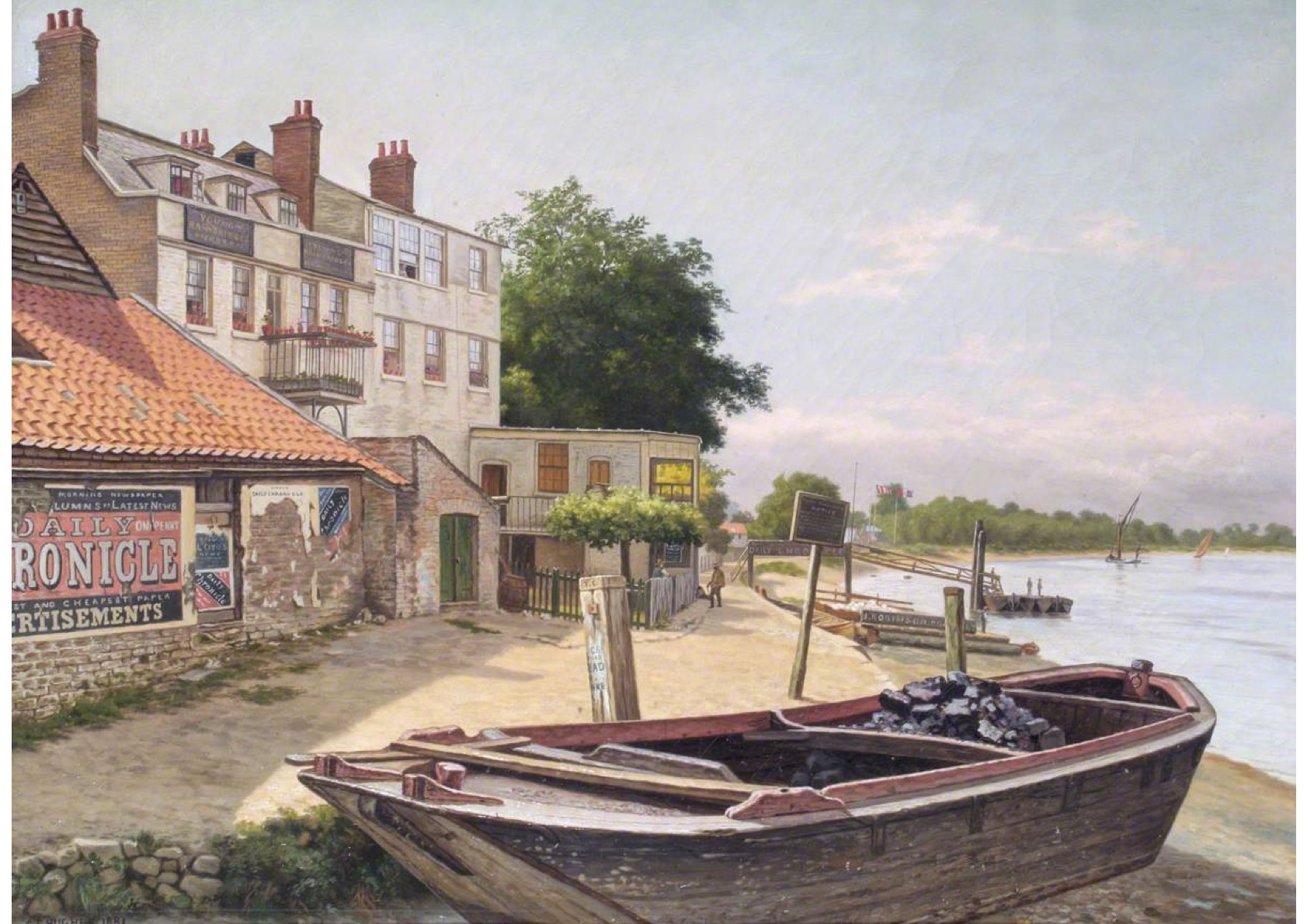
6
1. Fulham in 1792, old Putney Bridge in distance. Notice the natural river bank—and its erosion. (Joseph Farington R.A., print)
2. Cottage, Battersea, 1809 (John Bluck: Yale Center for British Art)
3. Richmond Bridge about 1810 (Sir Augustus Wall Callcott R.A.: Yale Center for British Art)
4. Millbank 1810 (David Cox: Yale Center for British Art)
5. Putney about 1840. Occasional erosion defences have still not joined up. (William Parrott: Wandsworth Collection)
6. Putney about 1880. Now the title is "The Embankment, Putney, London". (George Frederick Hughes: Wandsworth Collection)
Gallery
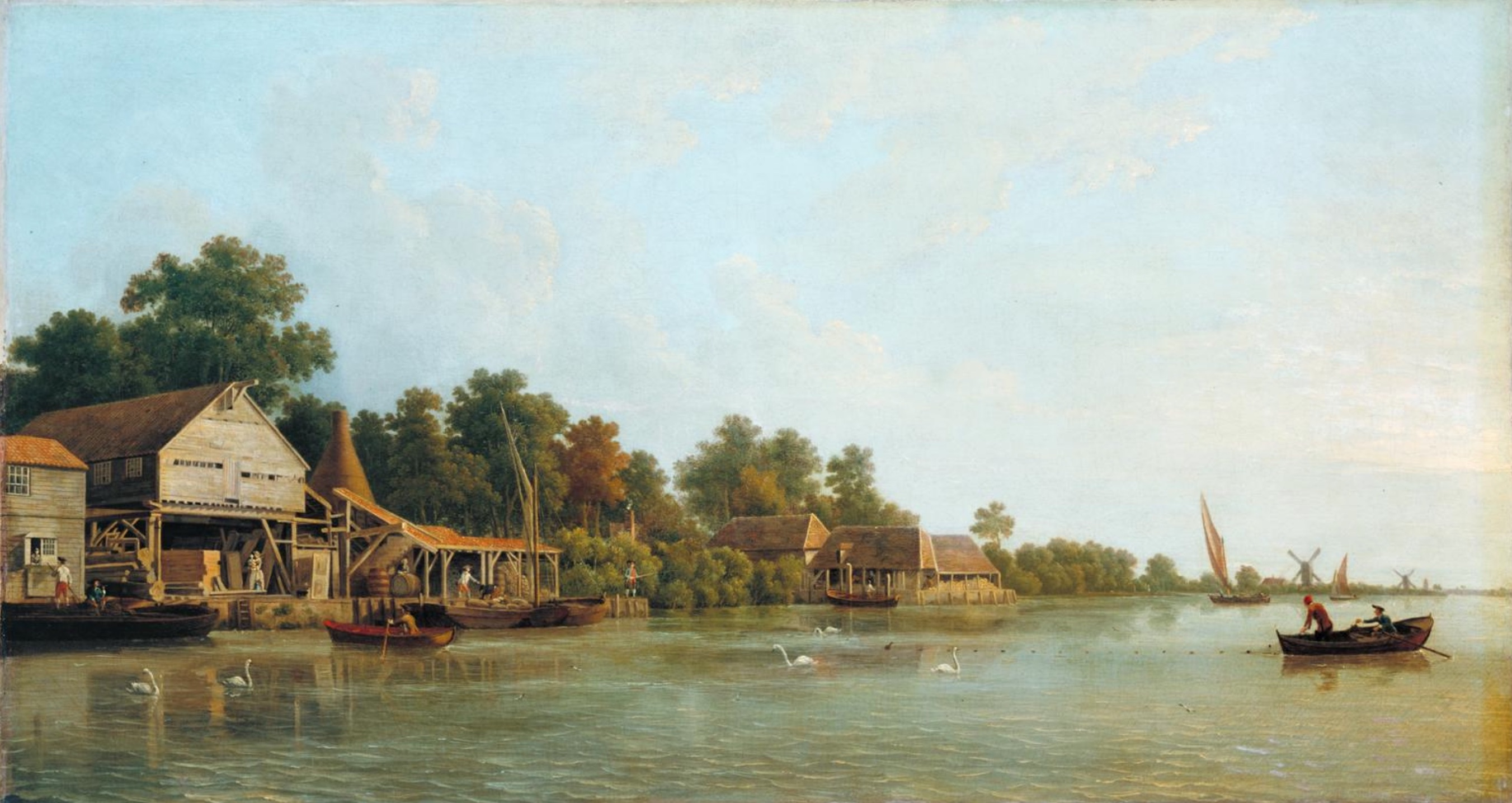
1. Nine Elms c. 1755

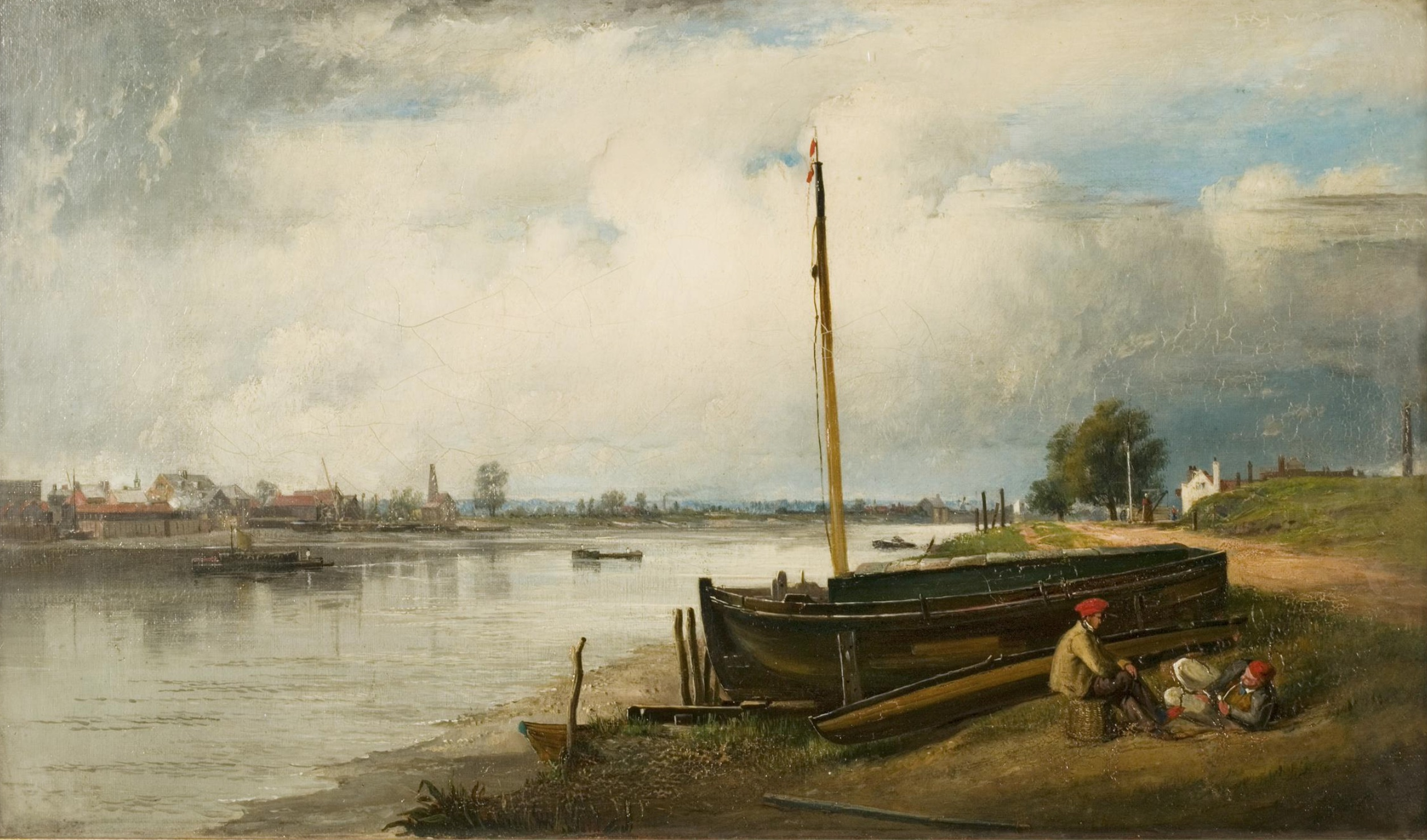
2. Millbank, prob. c. 1815

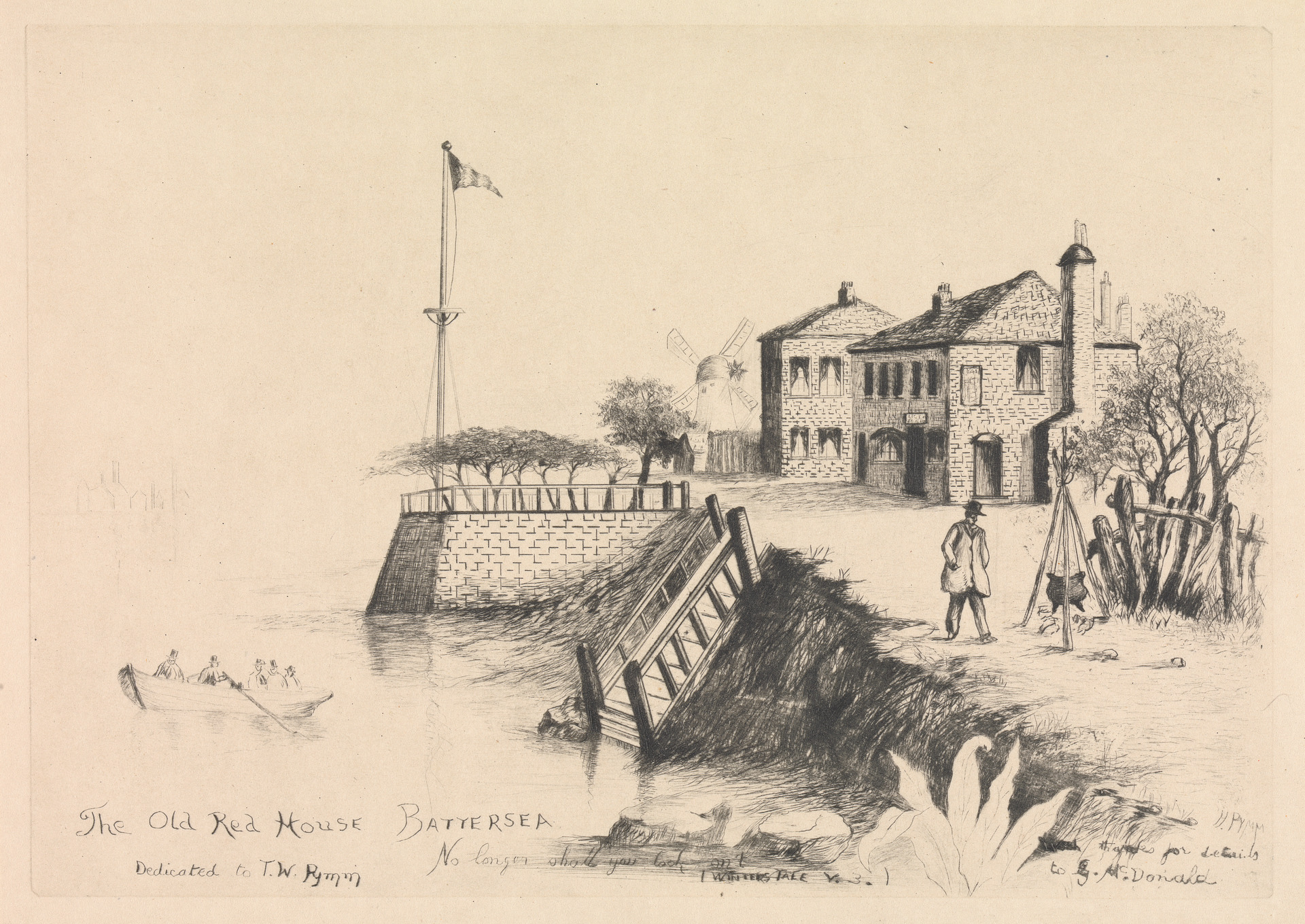
3. Battersea c. 1823

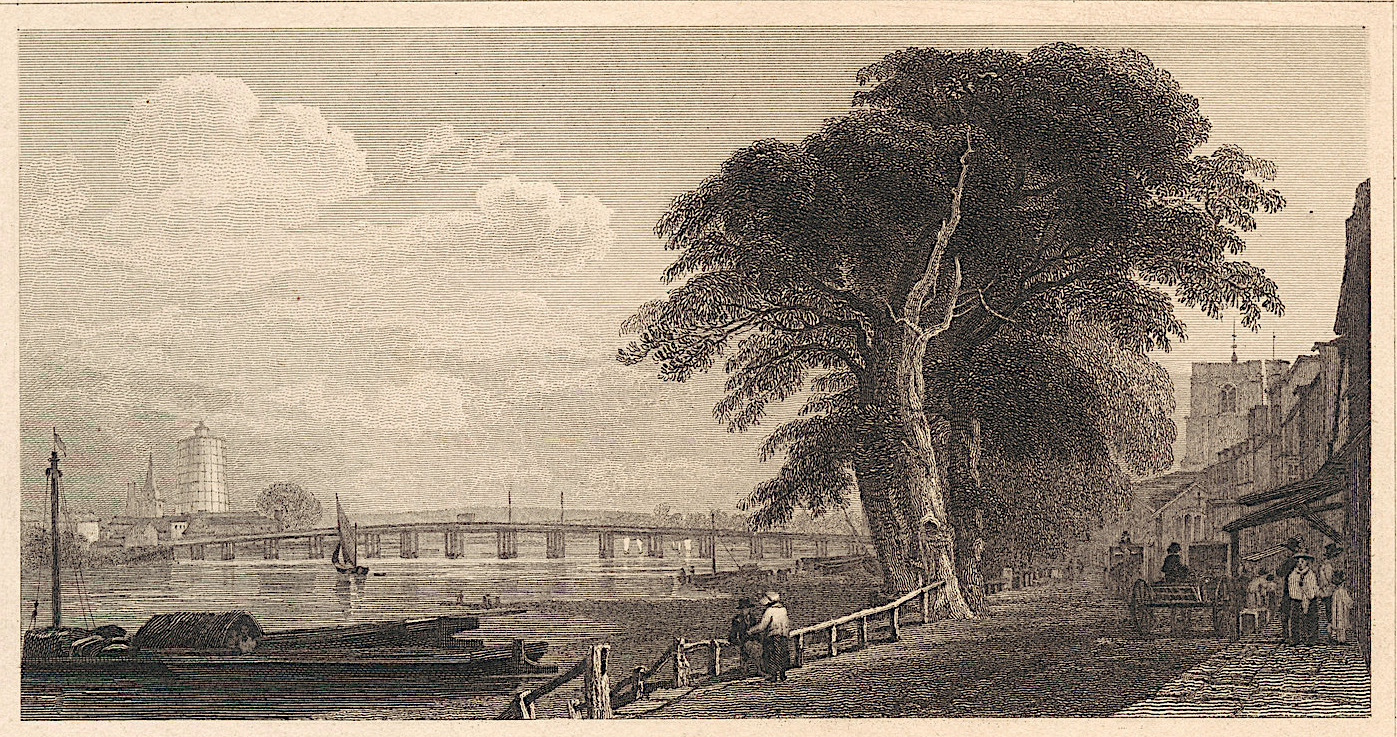
4. Chelsea 1825

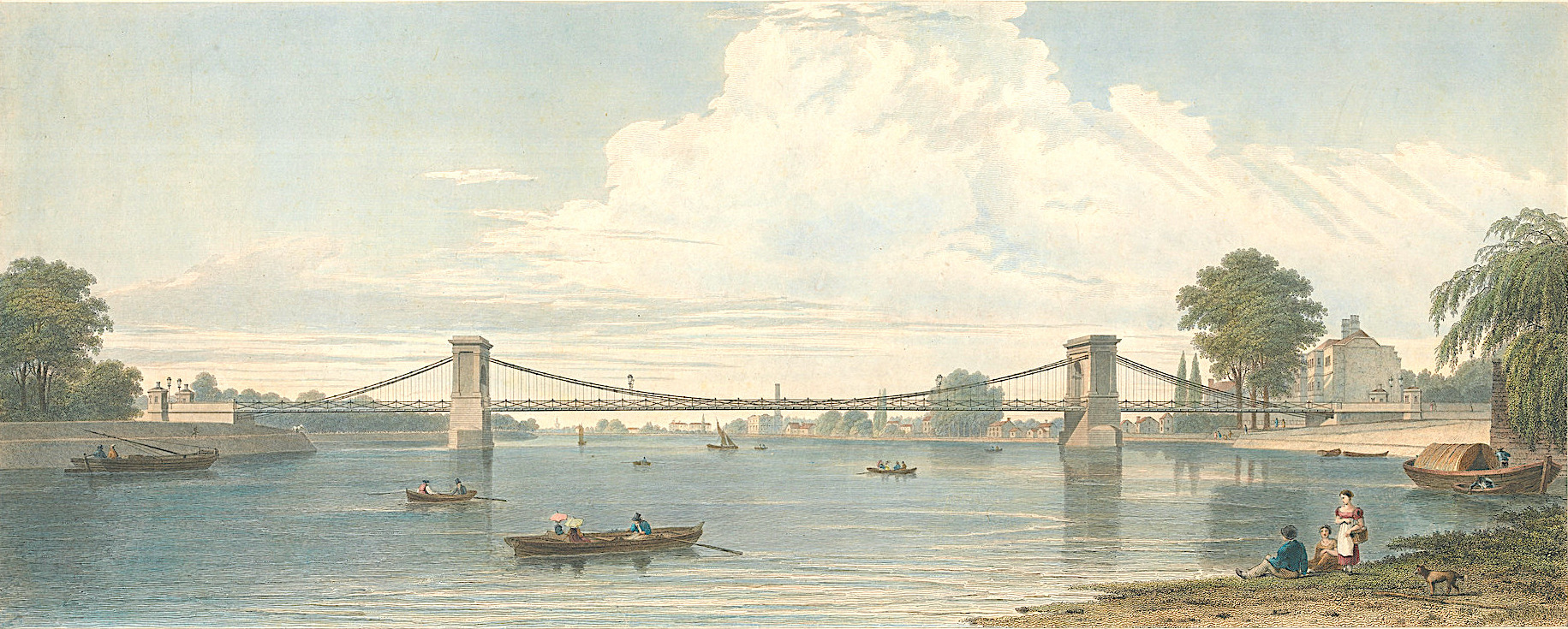
5. Hammersmith Bridge 1827
1. "A Sunset", woodyard on the left (Samuel Scott: Tate)
2. (Richard Redgrave R.A.: Victoria and Albert Museum)
3. "The Old Red House" c. 1823 (H. Pymm: YCBA)
4. Cheyne Walk looking towards Battersea Bridge, 1825 (Charles Heath: YCBA)
5. Barnes on the left, Hammersmith on the right (Letitia Byrne: YCBA)

=== East London ===
==== The struggle to make durable walls ====
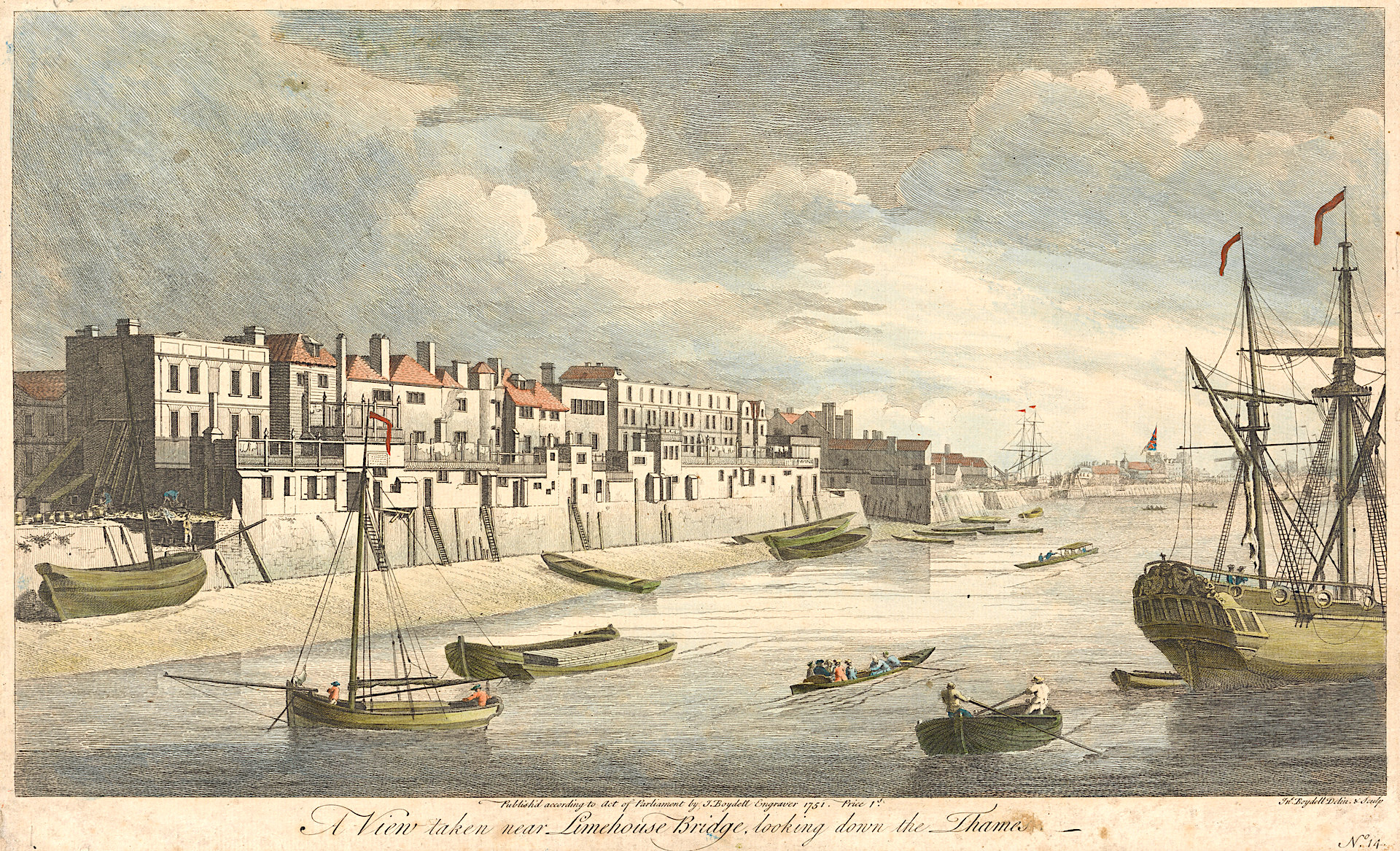
River wall at Limehouse, 1750. Notice the ladders. (John Boydell: Yale Center for British Art)

1325 A.D.

"The Jurors did present upon their Oaths; that a certain person of antient time Lord of the Mannour of Stebenhethe [Stepney], whose name they knew not, did by his industry recover a certain Marsh there, contain∣ing about an hundred Acres of Land, which Marsh was then drowned by the overflowing of the Thames..." — Dugdale, History of Imbanking, XV

1536 A.D.

"Whereas one Cornelius Vanderdelf of Barowe in Brabant in the parts beyond the Sea at his own proper cost and charge according to the King's high pleasure and commandment hath workmanly and substantially inned and fenced a certain ground containing by estimation 130 acres, lying and being besides St Katharine nigh unto the Tower of London and in the parish and town of Stepney, which 130 acres abut upon the highway leading from London to Ratcliff on the north part and upon the Thames on the south part, and the east part abutteth upon the Town of Ratcliff and the west part abutteth upon St Katharine aforesaid, which ground heretofore was continually for the most part surrounded drowned and overflown by the Water of the River of Thames ..." — Statute of Henry VIII.

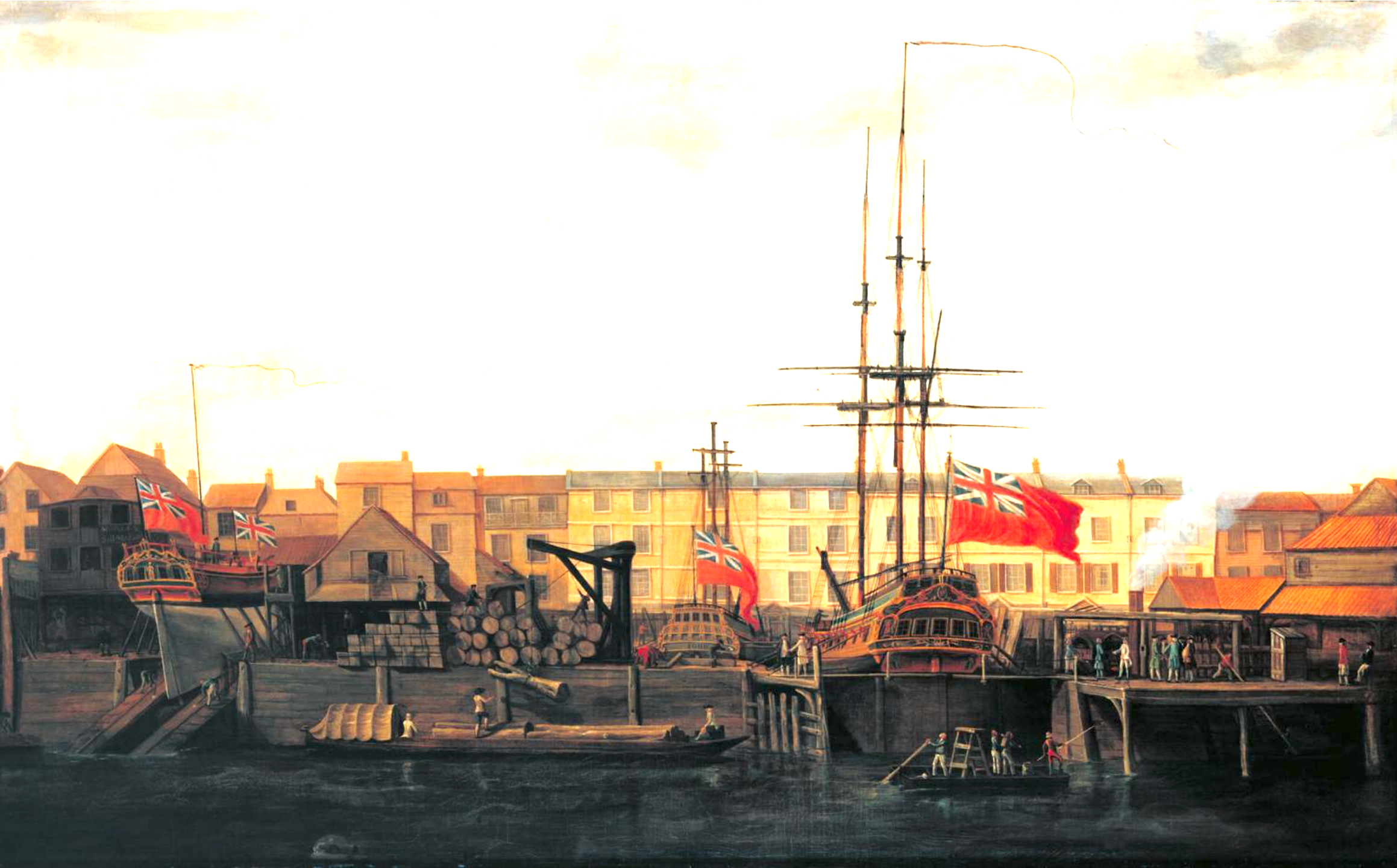
A Dockyard at Wapping, 1784. By this date the river wall (note houses thereon) was secure; dockyards and wharves encroached out into the stream. (Francis Holman: Tate Britain)

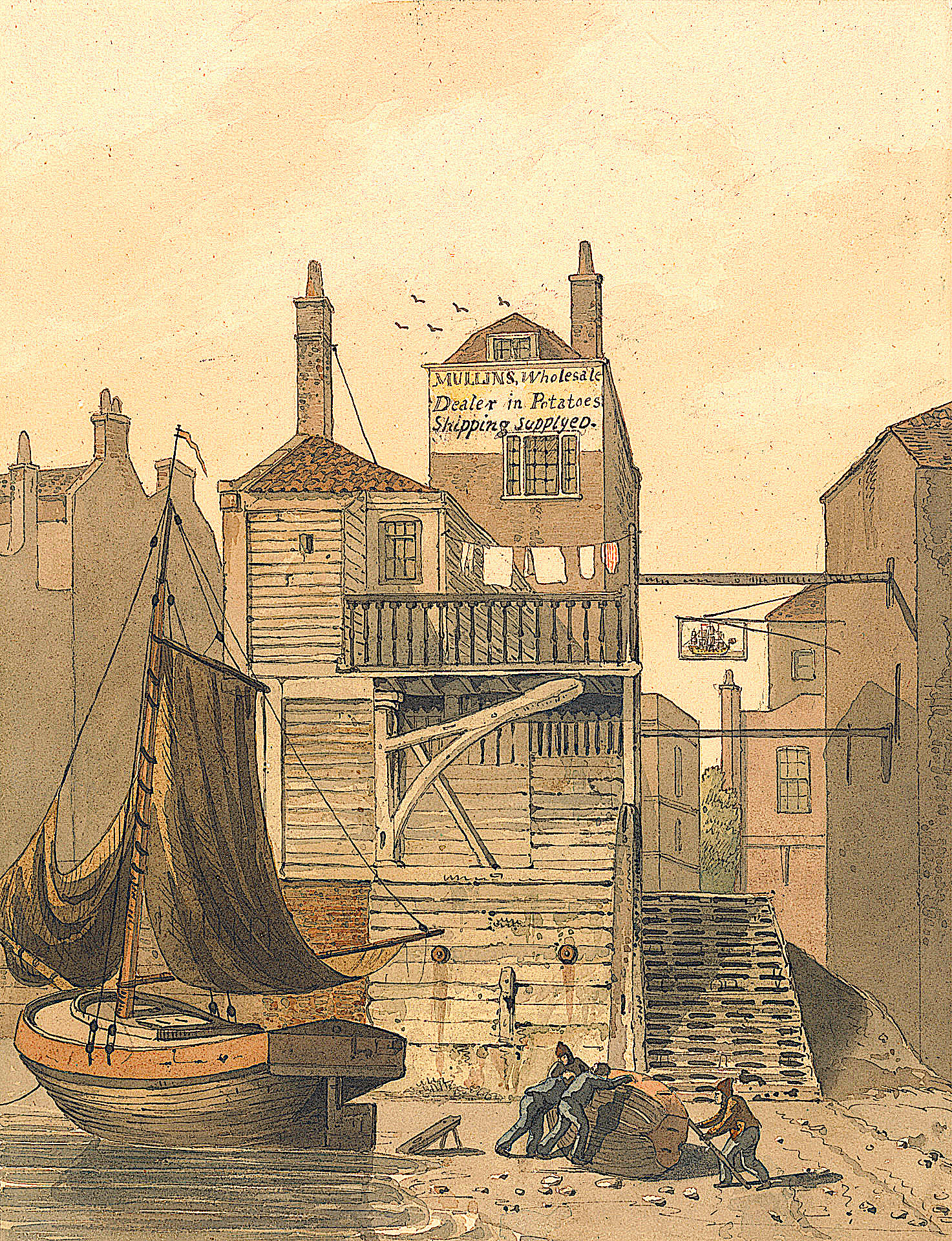
Shadwell, c. 1795. The waterfront was packed with marine industries, fire insurance unprocurable. (George Shepheard, The Ship Inn: Yale Center for British Art)

East of the Tower were the riverside hamlets of Wapping, Shadwell, Ratcliff and Limehouse, all part of the medieval manor of Stepney. The whole area is flat and low-lying. There was a long history of trying to reclaim the river marsh, defeated by breaches of the river wall caused by abnormal tides.

It was possible to walk from the Tower to Ratcliff along a gravel clifftop overlooking the Thames marsh. This was the Ratcliff Highway, a route already used in the Roman era. South, however, was "a low-lying swamp flooded daily by the tide and known by the suggestive name 'Wapping in the Wose'", or simply Wapping Marsh or Walmarsh.

This close to London, perhaps the original river walls went back to Saxon times, though there is no record of it. Already in 1325 a jury—asked about the banks and ditches between St Katharine by the Tower and Shadwell—said they had been made at some remote period in order to inn 100 acres of marsh. Further, an ancient custom of Stepney Manor applied. Tenants had been given land on condition they repaired the walls. Two "wall reeves" were supposed to inspect and admonish slackers. Defaulters could be taken to the manorial court and made to pay triple damages for harm caused ("for every peny three pence"). Despite this the river had broken through the wall again and re-flooded the marsh.

In 1350 Edward III founded the Abbey of St Mary Grace's on the eastern side of Tower Hill. In this desolate area lived nobody but a hermit called John Ingram with some swans. (He is commemorated in Wapping placenames like Hermitage Wall.) The abbey's Cistercian monks were skilled in inning and draining marsh. During the next two hundred years, working eastwards, they inned an unspecified area.

Even so, by the reign of Henry VIII, Wapping Marsh had been "longe tyme surrounded and over flowen with water". A Fleming named Cornelius Vanderdelf of Brabant was called in and he inned and recovered the marsh, described as the area lying between Ratcliff Highway and the Thames, and estimated at 130 acres. Today the area between the Highway and the Thames is considerably more than 130 acres: possibly, further land has been reclaimed since Henry's day by a silent process of gradual encroachment.

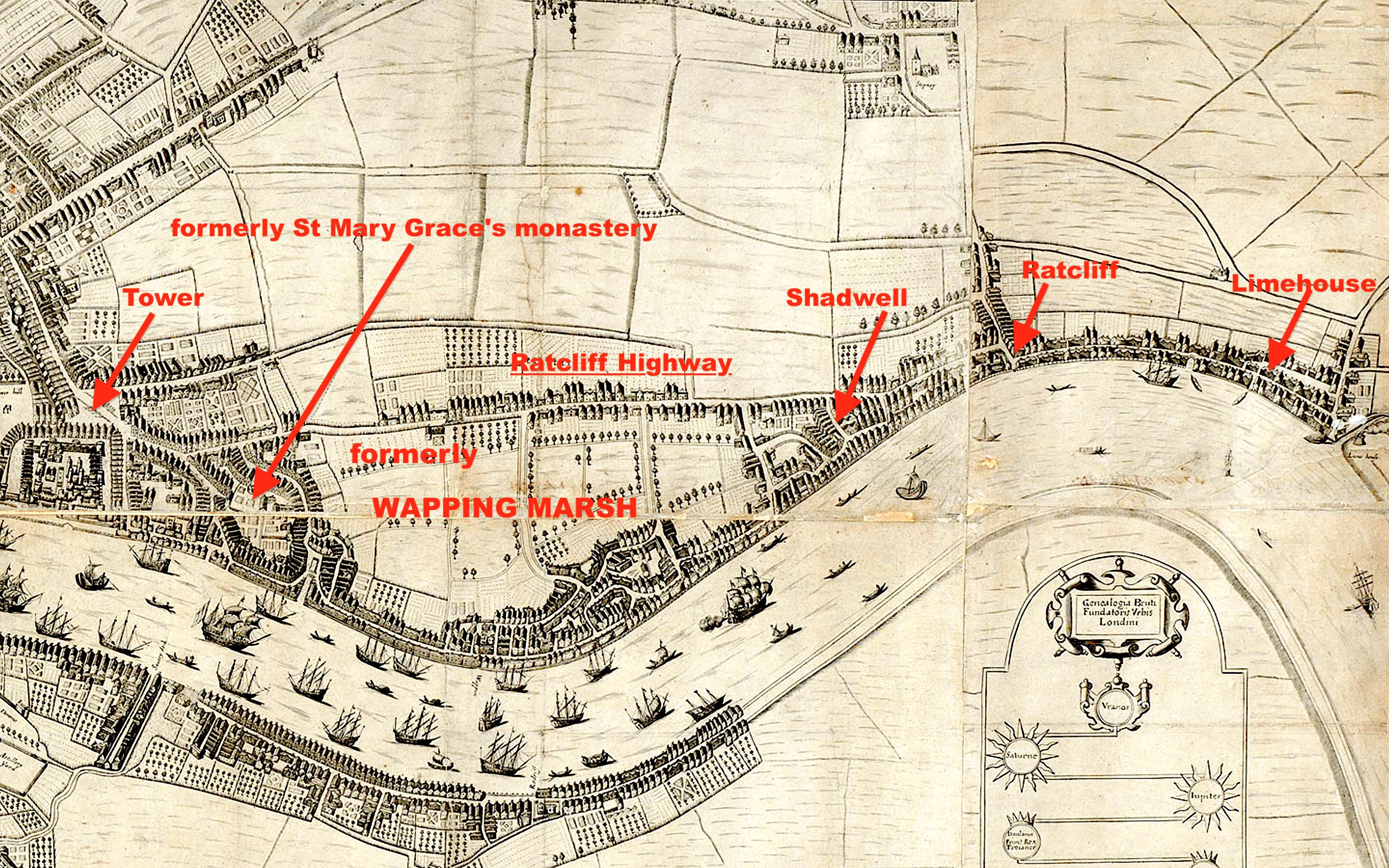
Port of London by 1660. Ribbon development along wall; cattle graze on Wapping Marsh, by now inned. (Base map by Fairthorne and Newcourt, an early quasi-realistic map of the region)

Still there were breaches, until at last, in 1575, the Commissioners of Sewers hit on the solution of encouraging men to build houses on top of the wall itself, after which it was so well maintained that no more breaches are heard of.

Placenames reminiscent of the inning of Wapping Marsh—like Wapping Wall, Green Bank and Prusoms Island—exist to this day. Marsh drainage needed cross walls, and these included Old Gravel Lane [now Wapping Lane] and New Gravel Lane [Garnet Street], "wherein Carts laden with Gravel from neighbouring Fields used to pass to the River Thames, where it was employed in ballasting of Ships".

==== The port ====
As England's maritime industry developed the wall was soon enwharfed. "As houses spread eastwards along the line of the river walls, wharves extended along the waterfront, claiming land from the river with dumps of crushed brick, crushed chalk from the lime kilns, clay, gravel and silt, laid directly on the river silts behind timber revetments". Already in 1598, Elizabethan historian John Stow could write:

... from this Precinct of Saint Kathren, to Wapping in the Wose, and Wapping it selfe, (the vsuall place of Execution for the hanging of Pyrates and sea Rouers, at the lowe water marke, and there to remaine, till thrée Tydes had ouerflowed them) and neuer a house standing within these fortie yeares, but is now made a continuall stréete, or ra∣ther a filthy straight [open] passage, with Lanes and Allyes, of small Tenements inhabited by Saylors, and Uictuallers, along by the Riuer of Thames, almost to Radliffe, a good myle from the Tower.

By 1600 ribbon development stretched virtually unbroken along the shore from the City to Limehouse.

==== Cause of Civil War ====
In the Stuart era the government of Charles I, short of money, thought of a scheme for making some. His Attorney-General started legal proceedings against people who owned houses built on top of the wall, saying they were trespassers. He asked for a court order to demolish the buildings, unless occupants paid rent to the government. He claimed the Thames was an arm of the sea and a navigable royal port, and that the king owned the soil of the river between the high and low water marks, and

all walls, banks, and common sewers leading along by the soil of the said river from Hermitage Wharf to Dickeshore [Duke Shore] in Limehouse; that the defendants had intruded on it by building wharves, houses, and docks on the shore, which belonged to the Crown, and were a nuisance to the river.

Since these houses had stood there for many years—had been officially encouraged—this claim was unlikely to appeal to a jury, but the government's lawyers found ways of avoiding a jury trial. Judges who disliked the government's legal case were pressured or dismissed. This sort of royal claim, repeated in other parts of the country, caused such resentment that it was mentioned in the Grand Remonstrance, leading up to the English Civil War.

==== Fire risk ====
After the Great Fire, London's building regulations required houses to be made of brick. But this area was declared exempt, because "it was believed they could not be built upon timber staves driven into the Thames mud". The result was described by Robin Pearson in Insuring the Industrial Revolution:

Dwellings, workshops and warehouses were thrown up rapidly, with little regard to the quality or materials of construction or the goods and manufacturing processes they contained. They were squeezed between wharves, rope walks, tar and pitch boilers, sail cloth and turpentine factories, timber yards, cooperages and small docks along the lanes and alleys of St Katherine's, Wapping, Shadwell, Ratcliffe and Limehouse ... This became notorious to underwriters as the 'waterside district'.

By the 1760s some fire offices refused to insure anything within 100 yards of the river wall, or they quoted punitive premiums. Boiling pitch and a saltpetre warehouse set off the great fire of Ratcliff (1794) which burnt over 600 houses. Wapping had 13 big fires, more than any other place in England. Fire itself cured the problem, however, by gradually clearing out the risky premises.

Gallery: Riverside pubs and their walls (The Art Journal, 1890)
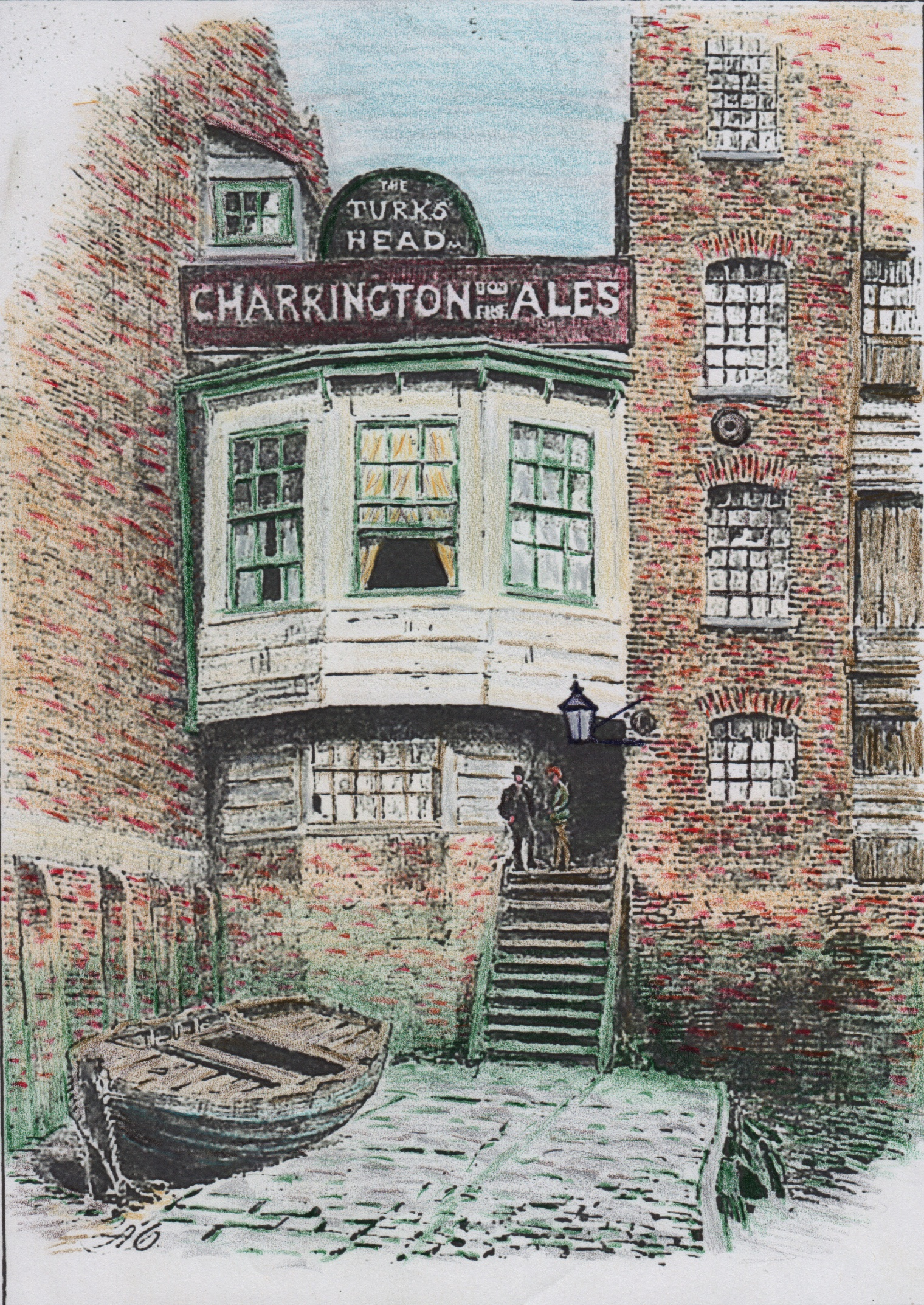
"The Turk's Head". Wapping

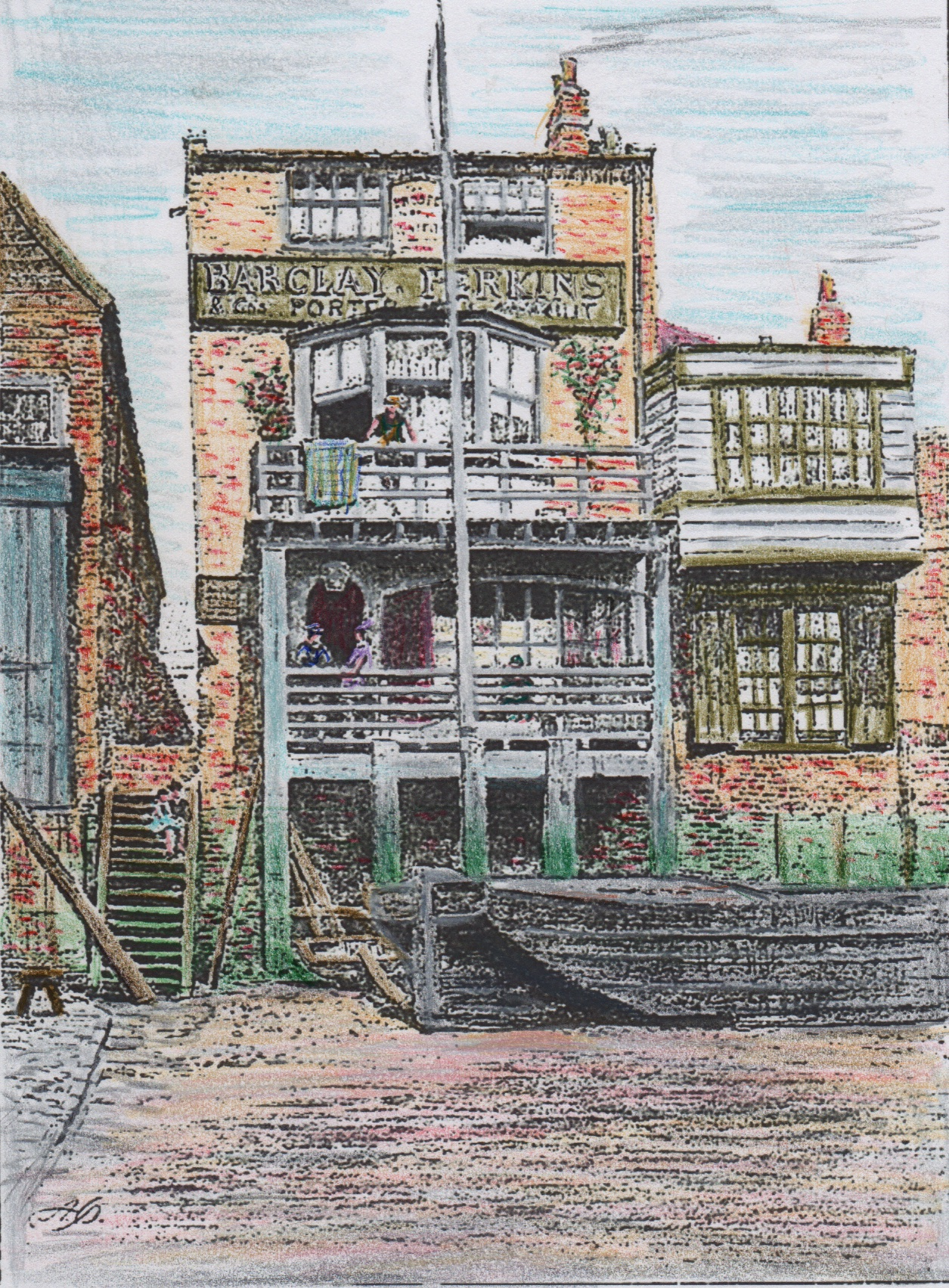
"The Prospect of Whitby", Shadwell

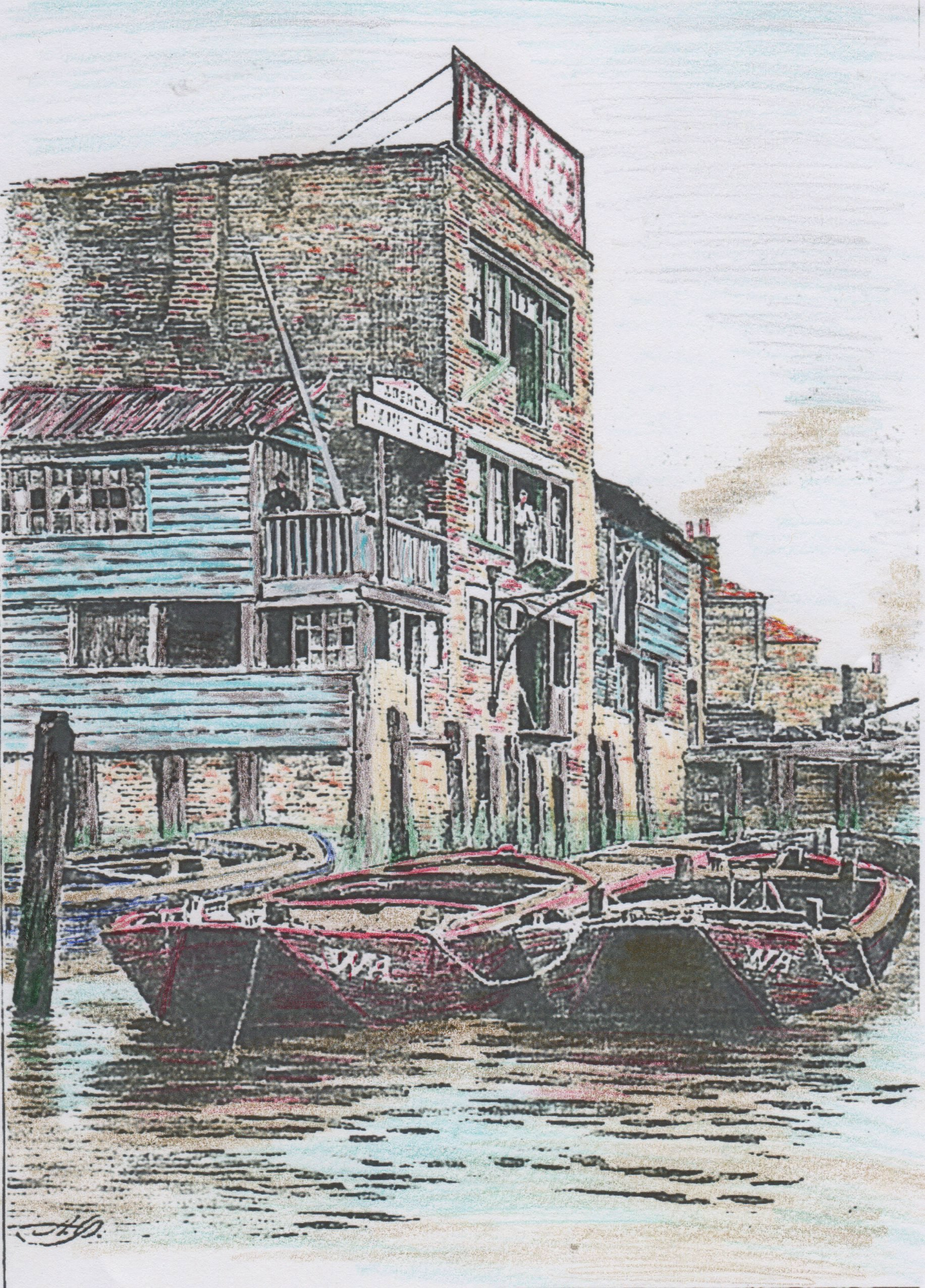
"The Two Brewers", Limehouse

==== Wapping inundations ====
The reclaimed area lay below high water mark, so nothing but the wall stopped it from being overflowed twice a day. But freak tides could surmount it, and during the 19th century did so with increasing frequency.

In 1834 a tide higher than had been known for 40 years did great damage not only in Wapping but in Shadwell, Blackwall, Rotherhithe and Blackfriars. The next year a storm surge made for a tide that overflowed Wapping High Street, down which a wherry navigated. In October 1841 something unusual was foreseen when the ebb tide was so low it grounded steamers in the Thames and made the river fordable. Then, at high tide it flowed into more than a hundred Wapping streets, flooding the cellars and shops and driving the inhabitants to the upper floors.

According to the Rector of Wapping, in 1874 and 1875, boats plied up and down the High Street with five feet of water beneath.

In Hermitage Street, where numbers of the houses have basements below the level of the street, the kitchens, many of them occupied by families, were filled to the ceiling, while the rooms above contained a foot or two of water ... One was chilled to the bone while visiting the damp and muddy tenements; and the line of water-mark on the walls was visible for months afterwards.

==== Archaeological finds ====
In 2005 a team of archaeologists reported an excavation of a site behind the wall at Narrow Street, Limehouse. Finds—including a range of imported fine pottery "unprecedented in the United Kingdom"—showed the occupants must have been unusually rich. "Meals were likely to be served on fine Mediterranean tableware and wine taken in glasses derived from the finest production centres of the age". They realised the 17th-century occupants had been retired pirates of the Caribbean, whom they were able to identify by name.

=== Isle of Dogs ===
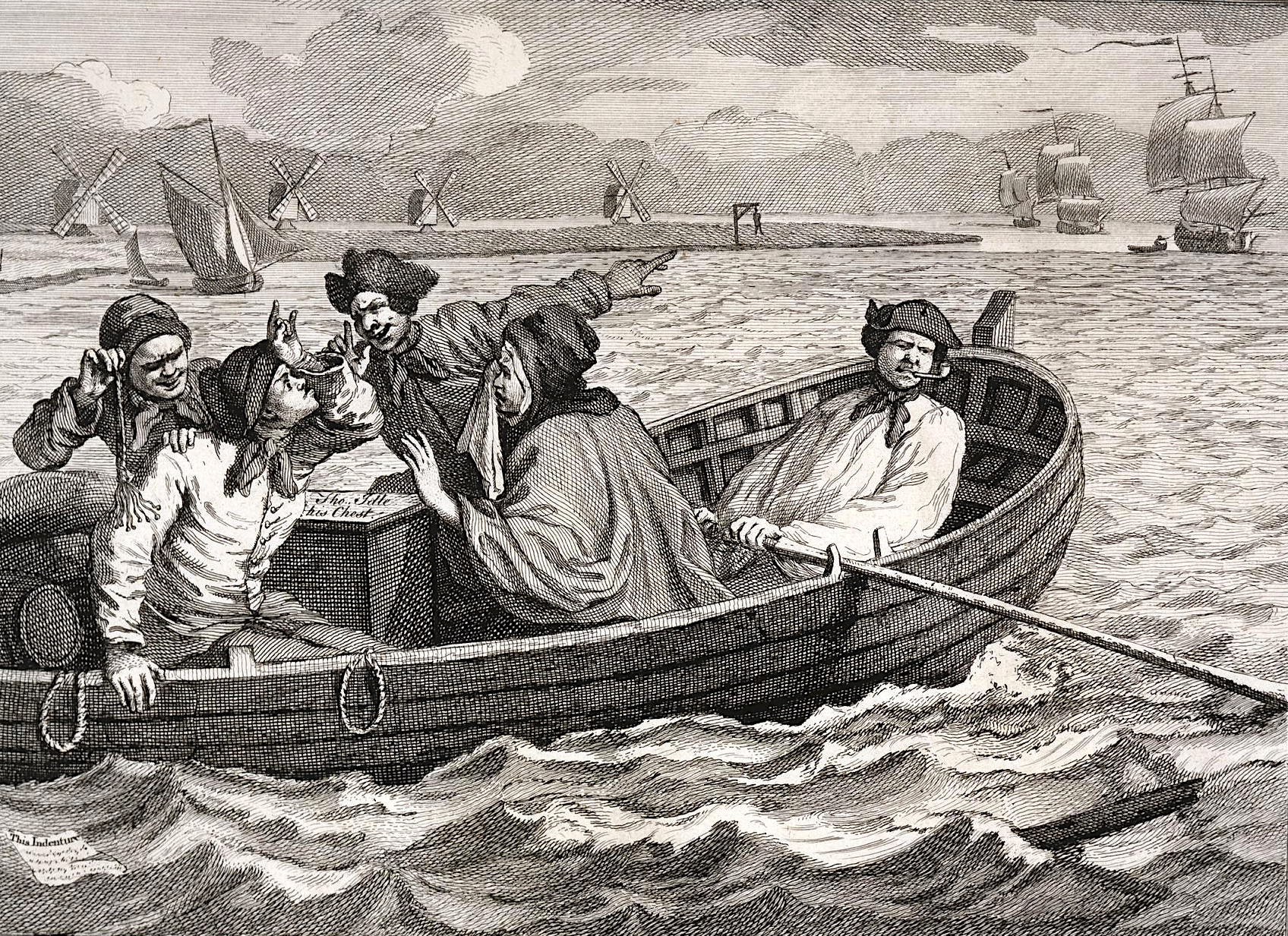
Four windmills and a pirate hanged in chains on the west or Mill Wall of the Isle of Dogs, seen from Limehouse Reach (William Hogarth: British Museum. For narrative, click on 'More details')

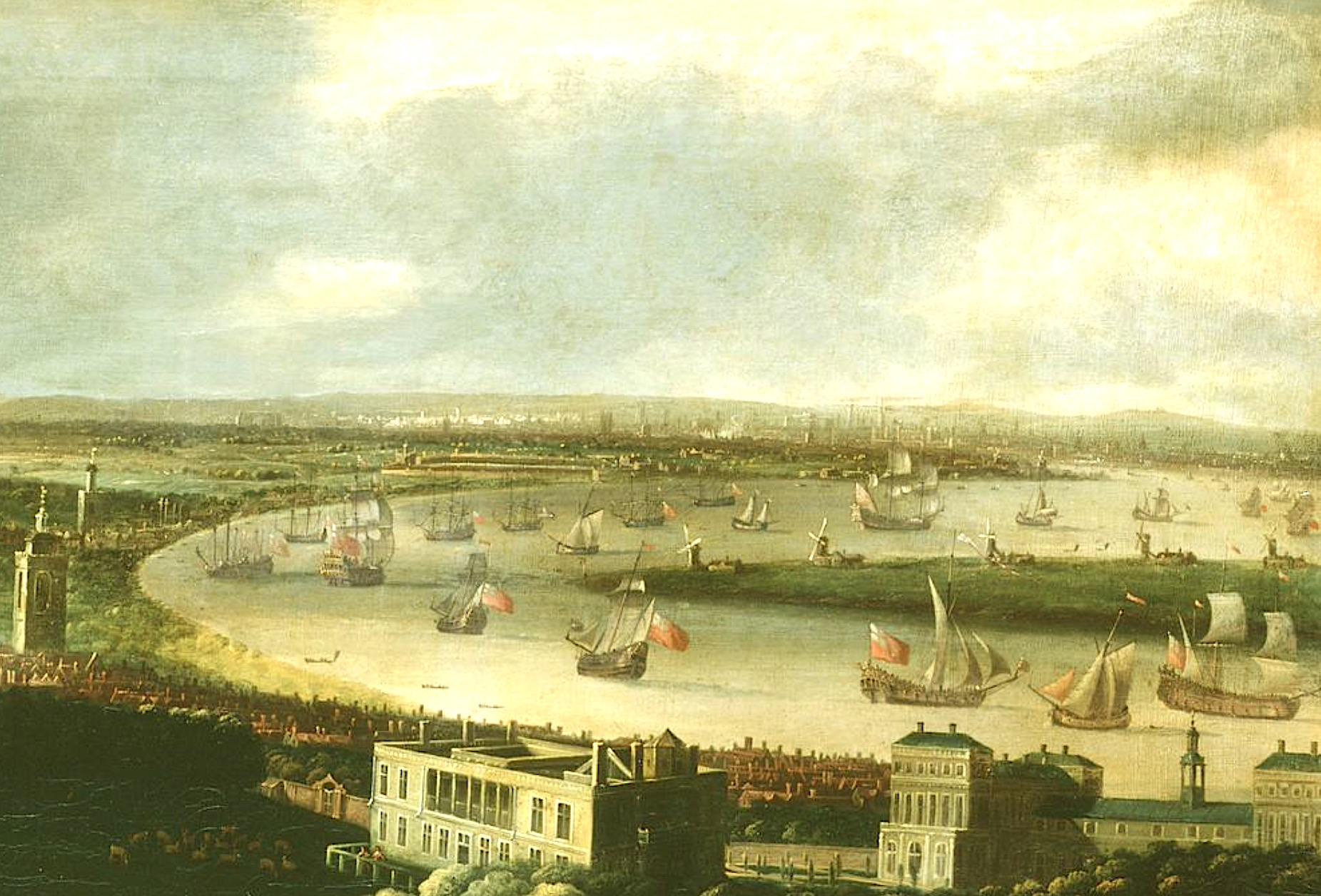
The Mill Wall seen from Greenwich, c. 1685 (British School, detail: Royal Collections Trust)

The Isle of Dogs—in reality, a peninsula formed by a meander in the Thames—was originally a marsh, several feet under water at high tide. At some period, probably in the Middle Ages, it was inned and drained. Given over to cattle and sheep, it was described as the richest pasture in England. The animals grazed below high water level, defended by the river wall (see title image). Since it was part of the medieval parish of Stepney the area was better known as Stepney Marsh. A solitary chapel, later a farmhouse, was the only building. The district kept its pastoral character until mid-Victorian times.

On 25 March 1448, owing to the fault of one "John Harpour, gentleman", who did not repair his bank opposite to Deptford Strond, the violence of tides made a 100-yard breach, drowning 1,000 acres of land. So held the jury. The land was under the tides for 40 years. Breaches occurred elsewhere at other times.

==== Millwall ====
The western wall was exposed to brisk winds. Some seven corn-grinding windmills were built atop it to take advantage of these. It came to be known as Millwall: at one time the Isle of Dogs itself was better known by that name. Pirates were sometimes gibbeted or hanged in chains on the walls, a warning to passing shipping.

==== The Isle of Dogs mirage ====
People standing on the Greenwich bank of the river, gazing across at the Isle of Dogs, could see a curious phenomenon. Normally, the cattle on the Isle of Dogs were not visible, because they were grazing behind the walls. But sometimes, as the tide rose, the animals seemed to float up into plain view. Some thought the Isle of Dogs itself was rising on the tide. Scientists, like Edmund Halley and Charles Hutton, explained it as a mirage—caused by moisture altering the refractivity of the atmosphere. The cattle vanished from sight as the tide fell again.

==== The great breach, or Poplar Gut ====
Poplar Gut was a part-severance of the neck of the Isle of Dogs in Poplar. But for river wall maintenance it might have been complete.

A classic fate of geological formations like the Isle of Dogs is meander cutoff, when the river takes a short-cut across the neck of land; the old bend is left as an oxbow lake. A question is why this did not happen to the Isle of Dogs, turning Greenwich and Deptford into mere lakeside hamlets.

Samuel Pepys' diary for 23 March 1660 recorded:

[In the Isle of Dogs] we saw the great breach which the late high water had made, to the loss of many thousand pounds to the people about Limehouse.

The great breach Pepys saw was in the west wall. It was brought about by ballast-digging on the foreshore. By the time it could be attended to, the incoming tides had scoured out a permanent lake extending a fair way across the neck of the peninsula. (Possibly there was a line of weakness there all along. A map of 1593 shows a small stream cutting off the meander entirely, more or less where the great breach later developed.)

In Gascoyne's map of 1703 the lake was called The Breach (in later maps, Poplar Gut). About 5 acres in extent, people fished in it from boats. Hundreds of East Londoners went swimming there on summer mornings. The area between the Thames and the lake is marked Old Breach, a placename suggesting it had happened there before. A 'horse-shoe" wall is inset around it; this was typical when a breach in the original wall was too difficult to repair. The resulting riverside space (or Forland) was used for the wet storage of timber. The river wall was 15-foot high and 18 feet across at its top, wider at its base.

Poplar Gut was a prominent feature until 1800, when it was absorbed by the new West India Docks. Today the site is part of the Middle Dock ornamental feature in the Canary Wharf financial district.

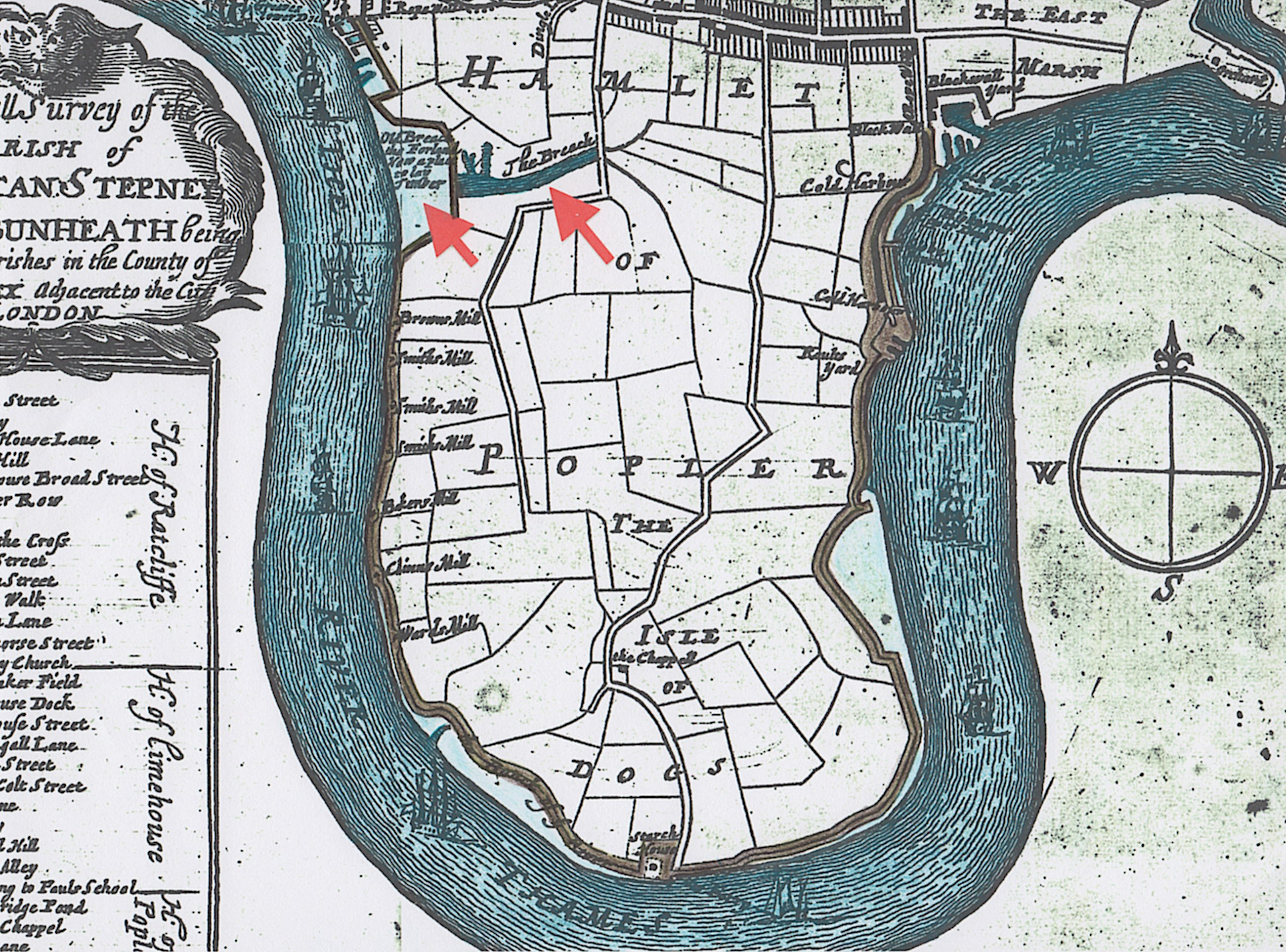
1

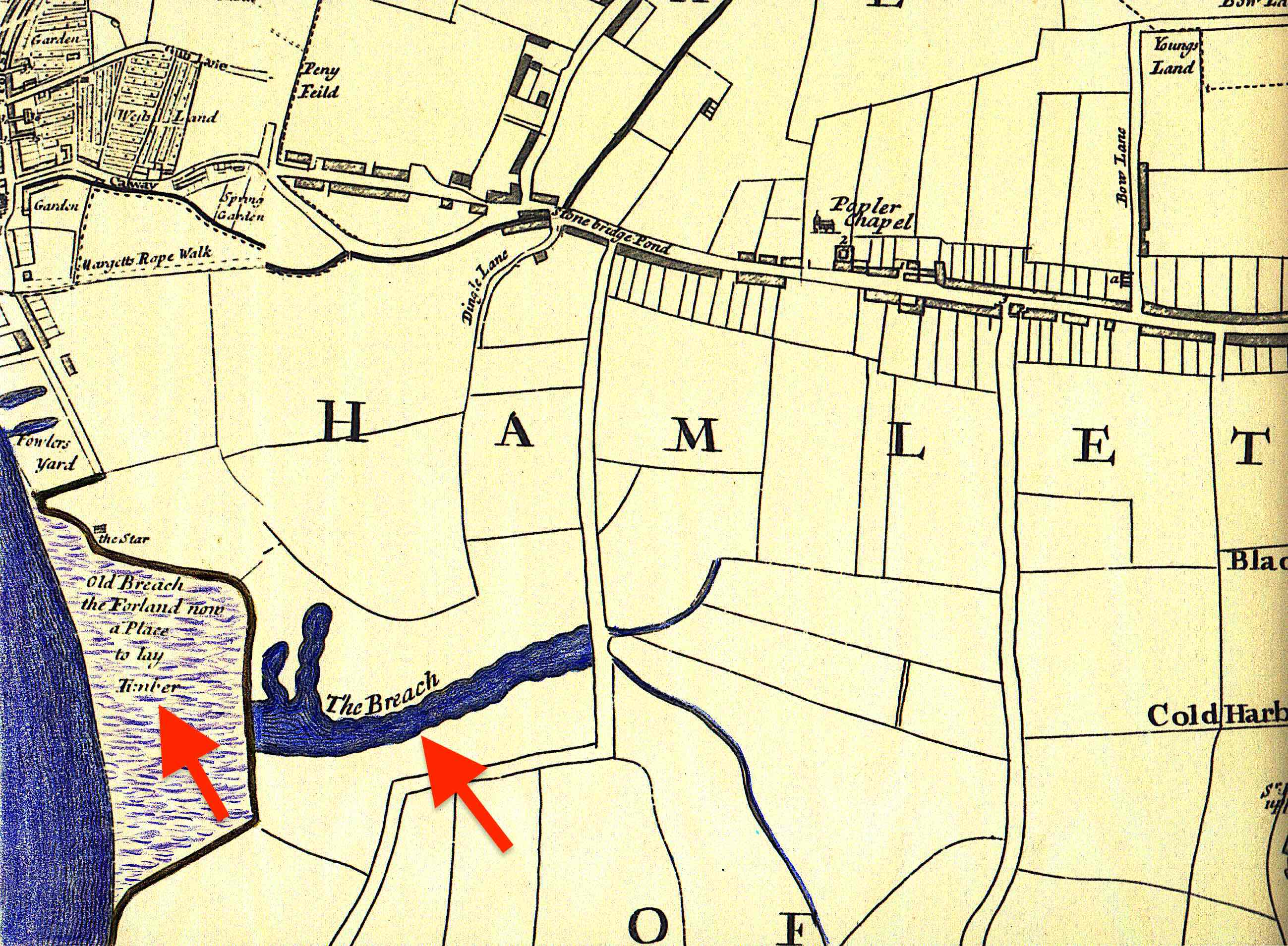
2

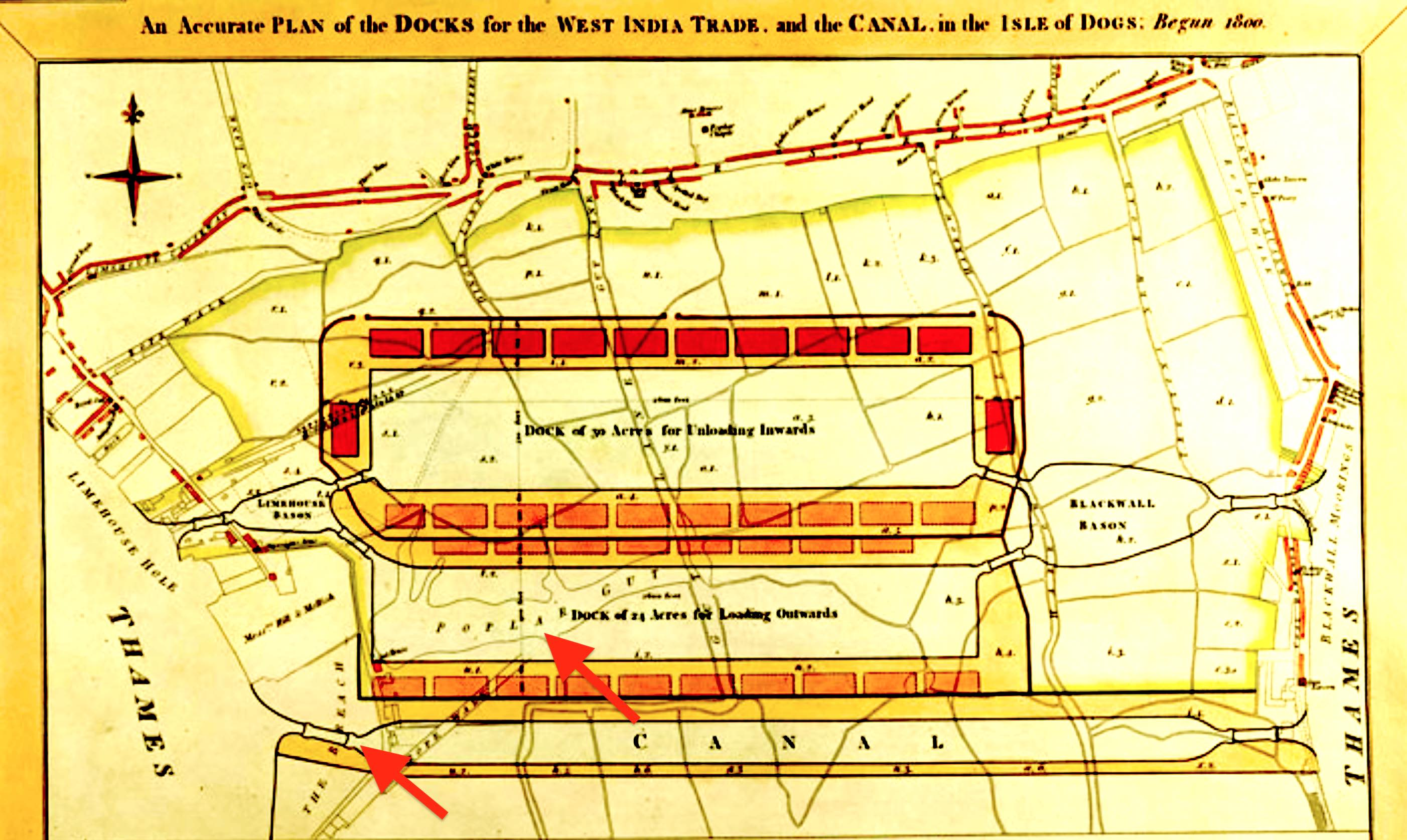
3

4
1. Isle of Dogs, 1703 showing the walls and (red arrows) the Foreland and Poplar Gut. The Foreland is one of the two prominent "horseshoes" made where the original bank could not be repaired. (Joel Gascoyne, Strype's 1735 reduction: East London History Society)
2. Closeup detail (from Gascoyne's An Actuall Survey of the Parish of St Dunstan Stepney alias Stebunheath, 1703)
3. The fate of Poplar Gut, 1800, absorbed by the new West India Docks (red arrows). (John Fairburn: British Library)
4. Today. Canary Wharf, London's second financial district, Isle of Dogs.

Samuel Smiles thought human intervention—specifically, river wall maintenance—preserved the meander at the Isle of Dogs, because the authorities had an incentive to sustain the royal dockyard at Deptford.

=== Stopping Dagenham Breach ===
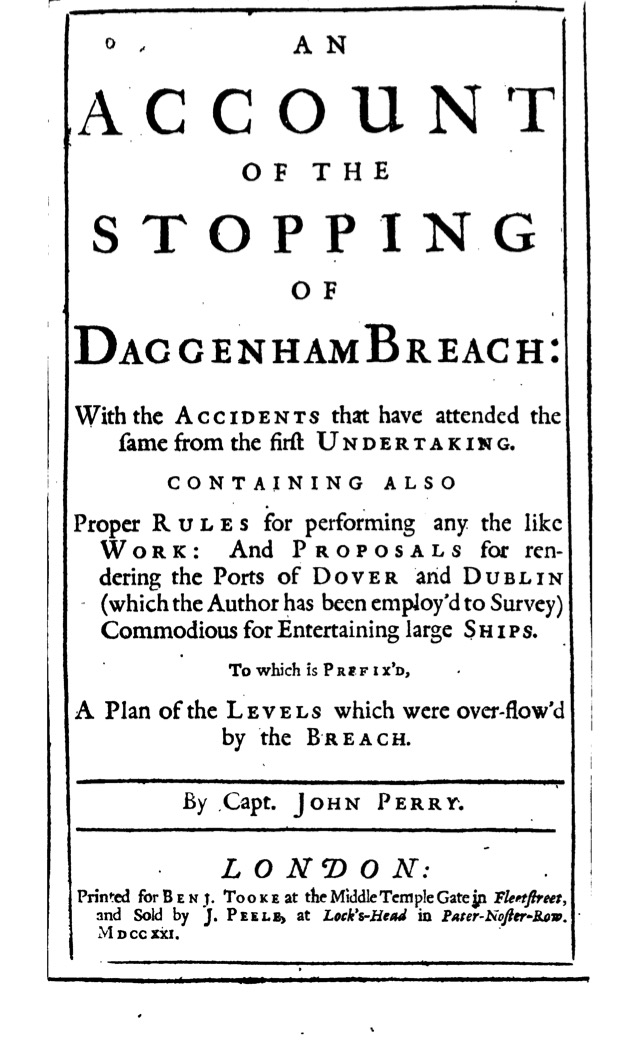
Captain Perry's book (1721), the first English work on civil engineering

Dagenham Breach was a break in the river wall through which the tides scoured out a large, permanent lake and flooded extensive lands. The scooped out sands threatened to block the navigation of the Thames itself. It took 12 or 14 years to fix—at ruinous expense. It was finally repaired by retired naval captain John Perry. Perry left a written account, described as probably the earliest work on civil engineering in England.

The background was that, south of the village of Dagenham and the manor of Havering, there was the usual Thames marsh. At some period in the Middle Ages it had been inned, perhaps by Barking Abbey. Commissioners of Sewers were responsible for the Dagenham and Havering levels. In 1594 the commissioners ordered the River Beam to be inned, not for the first time. The Beam was breached again in 1621 and was repaired by Sir Cornelius Vermuyden. This left two interconnected creeks forming a rough U.

On 29 October 1707 a great tide tore a 14-foot gap through the wall. According to Captain Perry this was because the sluice—a hollow tree trunk—was defective: it "blew up". The conservative English used wooden sluices, which eventually rotted; badly made too, wrote Perry, unlike the Dutch who made them from stone lined with "tarras" (tar).

The breach could easily have been stopped quickly: by setting back a small clay "horseshoe". But "it was nobody's business to act first". Successive tides continued to pour back and forth, widening the gap, gathering strength, cutting a channel through the clay and getting down to the sand and gravel strata, at which the scouring became so rapid the rush was overwhelming. The waters made a 100-foot gap and scoured out an inland lake—really, a tidal river—1 1/2 miles long and 20–40 feet deep. In a fortnight 1,000 acres had been flooded.

Three separate efforts were made to fix the breach. Each had to confront the same engineering difficulty: four times a day, thousands of tons of water were going to rush through that gap, if they could.

The landowners' attempt was the earliest. Their method was to narrow the channel by building a timber work on each side. Then they would wait for the next neap (weak) tide and plug the gap by sinking derelict ships, baskets of chalk, clay and so forth. The general principle was sound, and has been used since. But they failed to appreciate that water under pressure will always find any crack, however small, leak through it, and bore it out. A torrent developed. The ships—including an old man o' war—were literally blown away. The breach was worse than before. The landowners had spent more than the value of their lands.

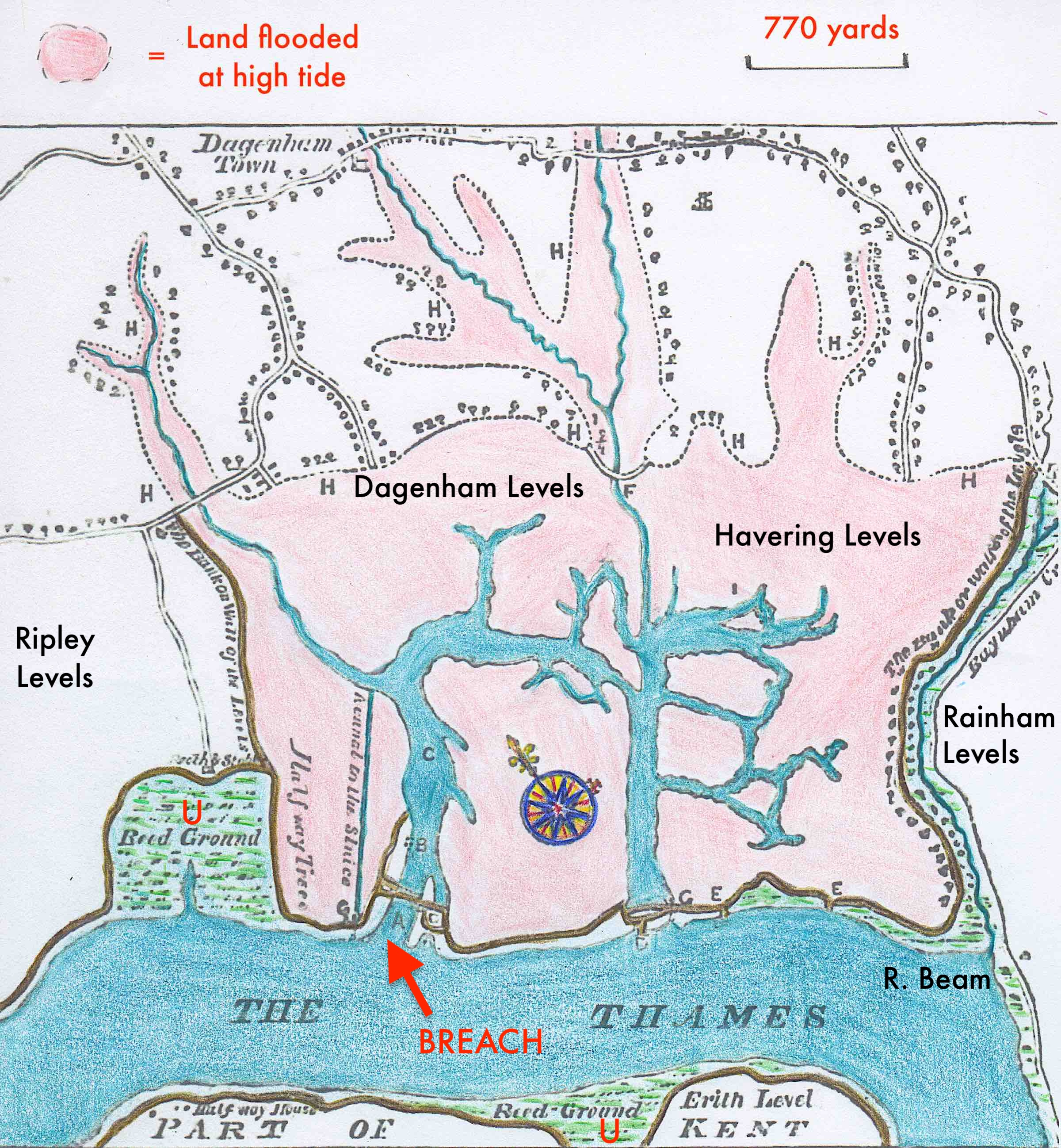
1

2

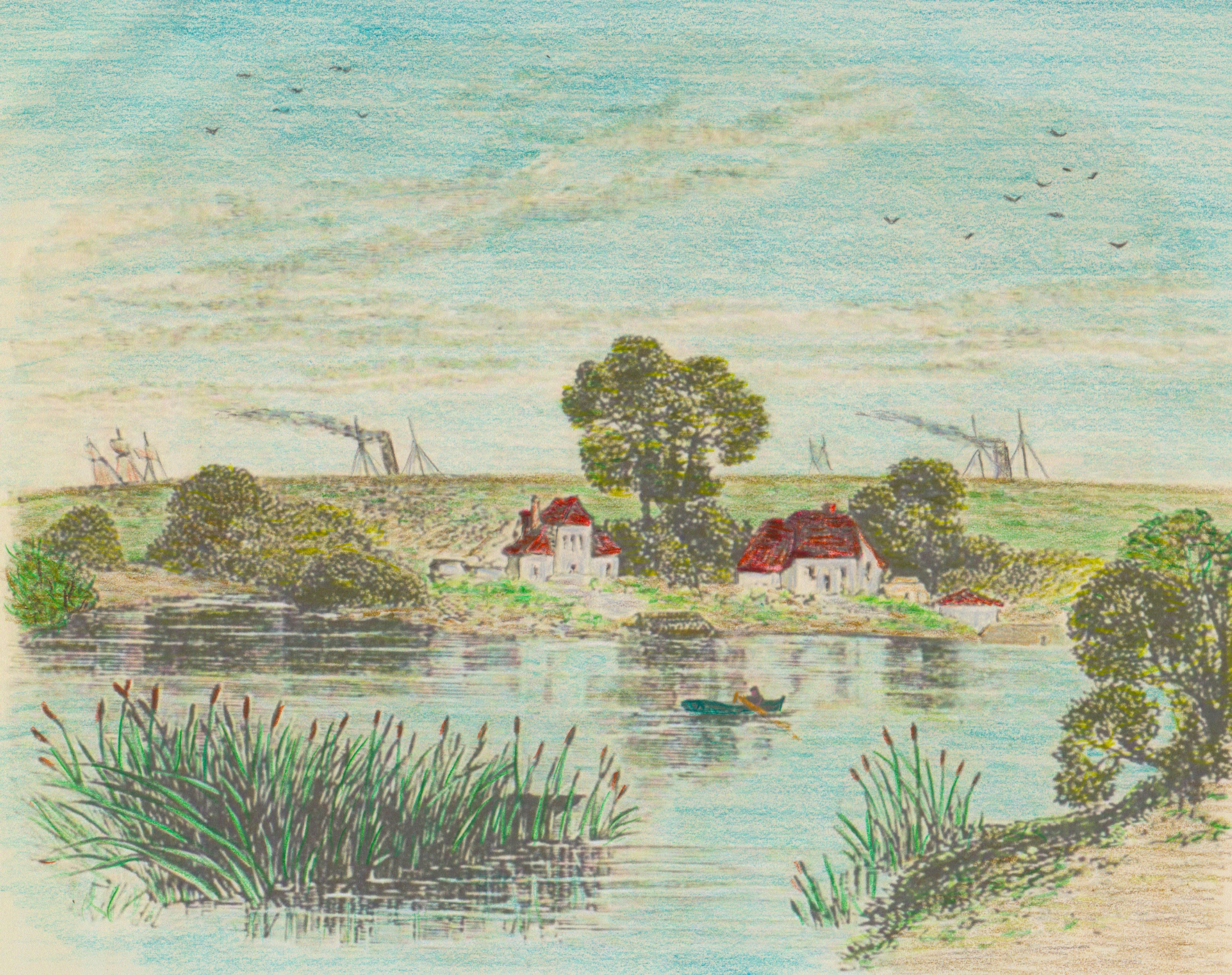
3
1. A map of Dagenham Breach. Tidal waters scoured out a permanent lake. The pink area was flooded at high water. The channel on the right was an old breach, fixed by Vermuyden in 1621. (Notice, unrelated to Dagenham Breach, two typical repair "horseshoes" marked U.)
2. Captain Perry's dovetailed piles (plan view), used to close the gap by building a dam across point A in the map.
3. Dagenham Lake, from a Victorian engraving. Thames shipping passes on the other side of the repaired wall.

According to the Victoria County History,

Dagenham Breach had now become a matter of national importance. The tides flowing in and out of it had built up a huge sandbank in the Thames, opposite the mouth of the breach, which threatened to bring shipping to a standstill. It was also clear that the mending of the breach was now beyond local resources.

Repair of Breach in Thames Bank at Dagenham Coal Duties Act 1713
- Act of Parliament
- Parliament of Great Britain
- Long title: An Act for the speedy and effectual preserving the Navigation of the River of Thames, by stopping the Breach in the Levels of Havering and Dagenham in the County of Essex; and for ascertaining the Coal Measure.
- Citation: 13 Ann. c. 20 (Note: This is the citation in The Statutes of the Realm.); 12 Ann. St. 2. c. 17 (Note: This is the citation in The Statutes at Large.)
- Territorial extent: Great Britain

Dates
- Royal assent: 9 July 1714
- Commencement: 10 July 1714 (Note: Section 1.)
- Expired: 10 July 1724
- Repealed: 30 July 1948
Other legislation
Repealed by	Statute Law Revision Act 1871Statute Law Revision Act 1948

Status: Repealed

Text of statute as originally enacted

A special act of Parliament, the Repair of Breach in Thames Bank at Dagenham Coal Duties Act 1713 (13 Ann. c. 20) was passed. Money was raised by a levy on shipping and imported coal. Tenders were invited for a contract to fix Dagenham Breach at public expense. The winner was one William Boswell, who in 1714 agreed to do the job for a success fee of £16,300 (about £3 million today). Boswell employed an improved version of the landowners' method. Instead of sinking miscellaneous ships, he used mathematically regular chests weighted with stones. Furthermore, the chests had internal doors to allow the tide to ebb and flow freely while the spaces between were being sealed. Only when sealed would the doors be shut. Despite all his efforts Boswell failed for, no matter what he did, he could never get his chests flush with bed of the channel.

A further tender was invited, which was won by Captain Perry. A lone wolf, he had been court-martialled and jailed for surrendering his ship too easily to the French, but afterwards pardoned. Perry agreed to fix the breach for £25,000. He adopted two simultaneous principles:

- He would close the channel by driving a row of piles into its bed to create a dam. Formed with dovetails (as in image 2), the piles would interfit, hence be watertight. To reduce the water pressure on them, the piles would be no taller than was required to close the channel at neap tides. Hence there would be time to rebuild the clay river wall before the next spring tide.

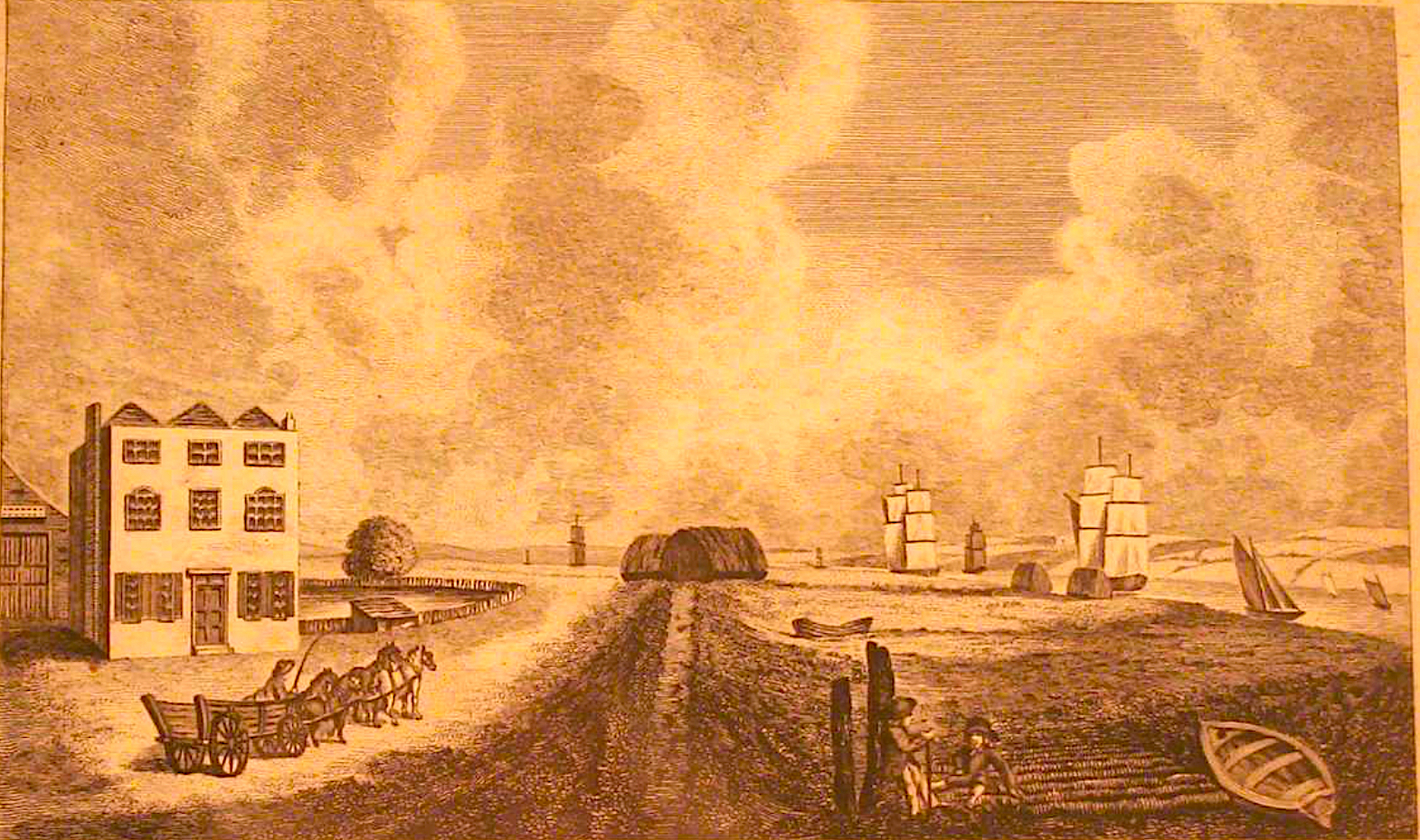
Dagenham Beach House in 1790, a prestigious lodge for anglers, with traces of Perry's remedial works (Valence House Museum)

- But, to further reduce the water pressure his pile dam would have to bear, Perry would make extra apertures through the river wall. Fitted with sluices, they would allow the tide to continue to ebb and flow, finally being closed only when Dagenham Breach had been plugged.

Beset with difficulties, including suppliers who sold him defective clay, a nightwatchman who failed to warn him about an extra-high tide, strikes, and cashflow problems, Perry eventually succeeded, finally plugging the gap on 18 June 1719. He got his success fee, but he was a ruined man. Parliament voted him an extra reward.

The lake remained, as did Captain Perry's house, called Dagenham Beach House. It was popular with anglers. Cabinet ministers went there annually for fish dinners. Later, the lake was made into Dagenham Dock. The Ford Motor Company built its Dagenham works to take advantage of it. Parts of it remain to this day.

=== The Erith explosion ===
Early in the morning of 1 October 1864 a blast was heard all over London and up to 100 miles away. A gunpowder barge moored near Erith, Kent had ignited, setting off two landward powder magazines: the resulting chain explosion consumed 46 1/2 tons of gunpowder and blew the river wall into the Thames.

Fortunately it was low tide, but Lewis Moore, an engineer who chanced to live nearby, realised the gap must be plugged before the tide rose—high water was due at 1:30 p.m. A calamity was impending, worse than Poplar Gut or Dagenham Breach, for the gap was 110 feet long exposing the whole of the country to the rising tide.

The extent of land positively imperilled would be about 4,000 acres, and should it have passed Woolwich and Greenwich by the large sewer [Bazalgette's Low Level Sewer, which went as far west as Putney], it might have done immense damage; the whole of the southern and eastern side of London being more or less below the level of high water.

He called for help from navvies building Crossness Pumping Station and the garrison at the Woolwich Arsenal. Racing against the tide, they improvised impermeable puddled clay to fill the gap and earth-filled artillery sandbags to back it up. If the explosion had occurred even one hour later it would have been impossible to staunch the flow.

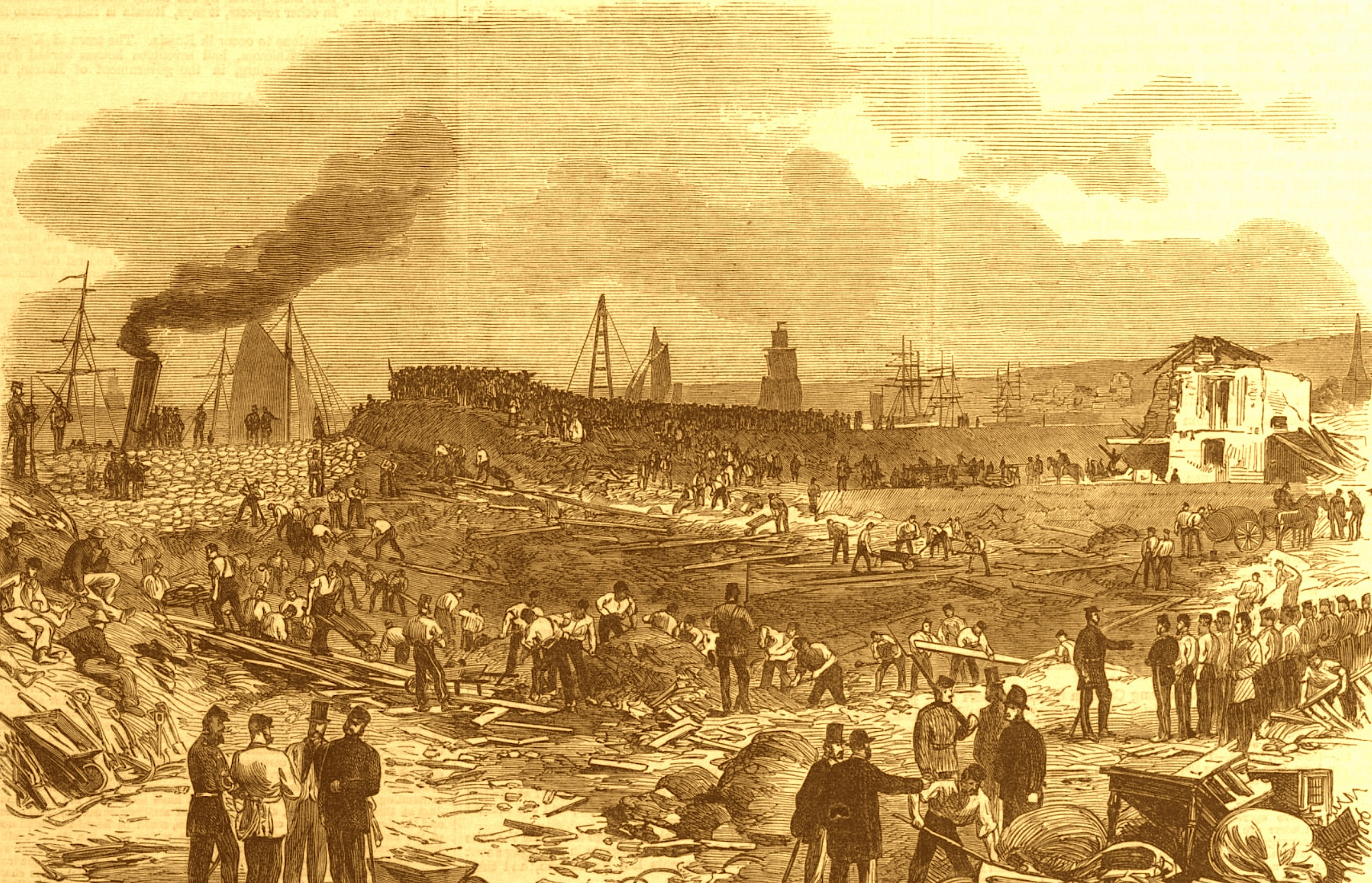
1. Racing against the tide (Illustrated London News, 8 October 1864)

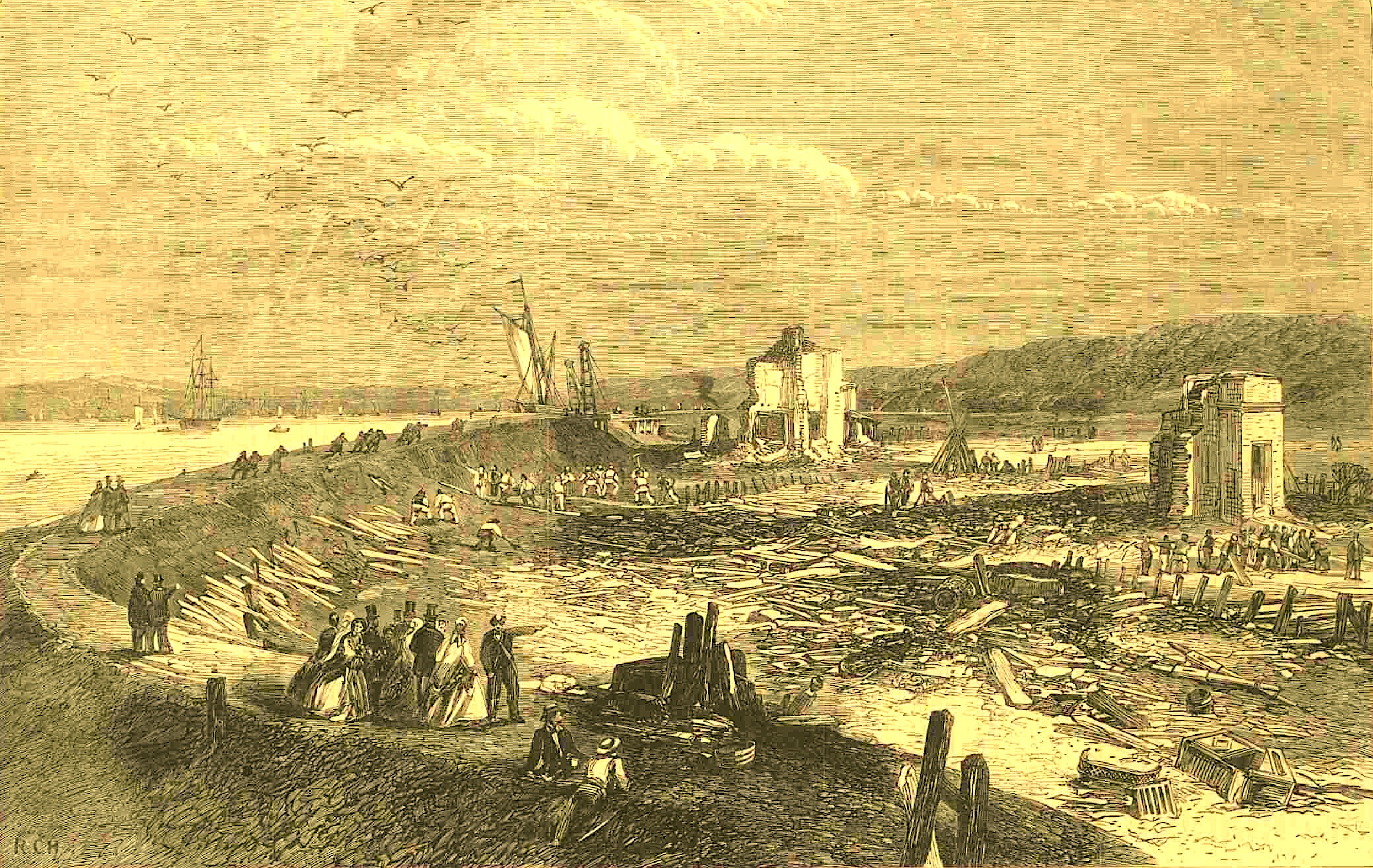
2. Consolidating the wall (Illustrated London News, 15 October 1864)
1. As the tide rises, workmen race to plug the breach with improvised puddled clay and sandbags
2. Having succeeded against the odds, relief shifts have time to restore the river wall

This was not the first time the wall had collapsed. In 1527, half a mile away, the river had irrupted and drowned the land for 63 years; it had to be reclaimed piecemeal by inning.

== London parliamentary embankments ==
Some embankments were explicitly authorised by Parliament. These were not intended as flood defences, primarily.

=== 17th century ===
The first of these was for providing a road beside the river. Called the Forty-foot way, it was proposed by Sir Christopher Wren as part of the rebuilding of London after the Great Fire. The bank between the Tower and the Temple was to be kept clear of buildings for a distance of 40 feet. Section 33 of the Rebuilding of London Act 1666 (18 & 19 Cha. 2. c. 8) was passed to that effect. This open quay existed for 100 years, but then prohibition became ineffective. There were so many building encroachments that the act became a dead letter, and was eventually repealed.

A.D. 1666

"That noe House Outhouse or other building whatsoever (Cranes and Sheds for present use onely excepted) shall be built or erected within the distance of Forty foote of such part of any Wall Key or Wharfe as bounds the River of Thames, from Tower Wharfe to London Bridge and from London Bridge to the Temple Staires, Nor any House Outhouse or other building (Cranes onely excepted) be built or erected within the distance of threescore and ten foote of the midle of any part of the Coommon Sewers coommonly called or knowne by the nams of Bridewell Docke Fleete Ditch and Turmill Brooke from the River of Thames to Clarkenwell upon either side of them before the fower and twentieth day of March which shall be in the yeare of our Lord One thousand six hundred sixty eight".

=== 18th century ===
The first public works embankment was made by Robert Mylne in 1767 in connection with the building of Blackfriars Bridge. Half a mile long, it started at Paul's Wharf and went in a smooth line to the Temple, fronting its riverside gardens. It was not a road, but a straightening of the river bank. Its purpose was to prevent the accumulation of malodorous silt.

In 1777 funds were authorised to make a horse-towing path above Fulham.

==== The Adelphi encroachment ====
London (Thames Embankment) Act 1771
- Act of Parliament
- Parliament of Great Britain
- Long title: An Act for enabling certain Persons to enclose and embank Part of the River Thames adjoining to Durham Yard, Salisbury Street, Ceal Street, and Beaufort Buildings, in the County of Middlesex.
- Citation: 11 Geo. 3. c. 34
- Territorial extent: Great Britain

Dates
- Royal assent: 8 May 1771
- Commencement: 13 November 1770 (Note: Start of session.)
Other legislation
Amended by	Adelphi Estate Act 1933; Adelphi Estate Act 1991

Status: Amended

Text of statute as originally enacted

In 1770, at a site that is today between the Strand and Victoria Embankment Gardens, but then was under the waters of the Thames, the Adam brothers laid a foundation that protruded 100 feet into the stream. According to social campaigner Granville Sharp, they did it by illegally and furtively dumping rubbish into the river until they got a firm surface. On this foundation they built a quay with archways, and the prestigious Adelphi Terrace above and behind. Strenuously opposed by the Corporation of London, the brothers managed to get an act of Parliament, the London (Thames Embankment) Act 1771 (11 Geo. 3. c. 34) to authorise their reckless fait accompli.

The Adam brothers' encroachment
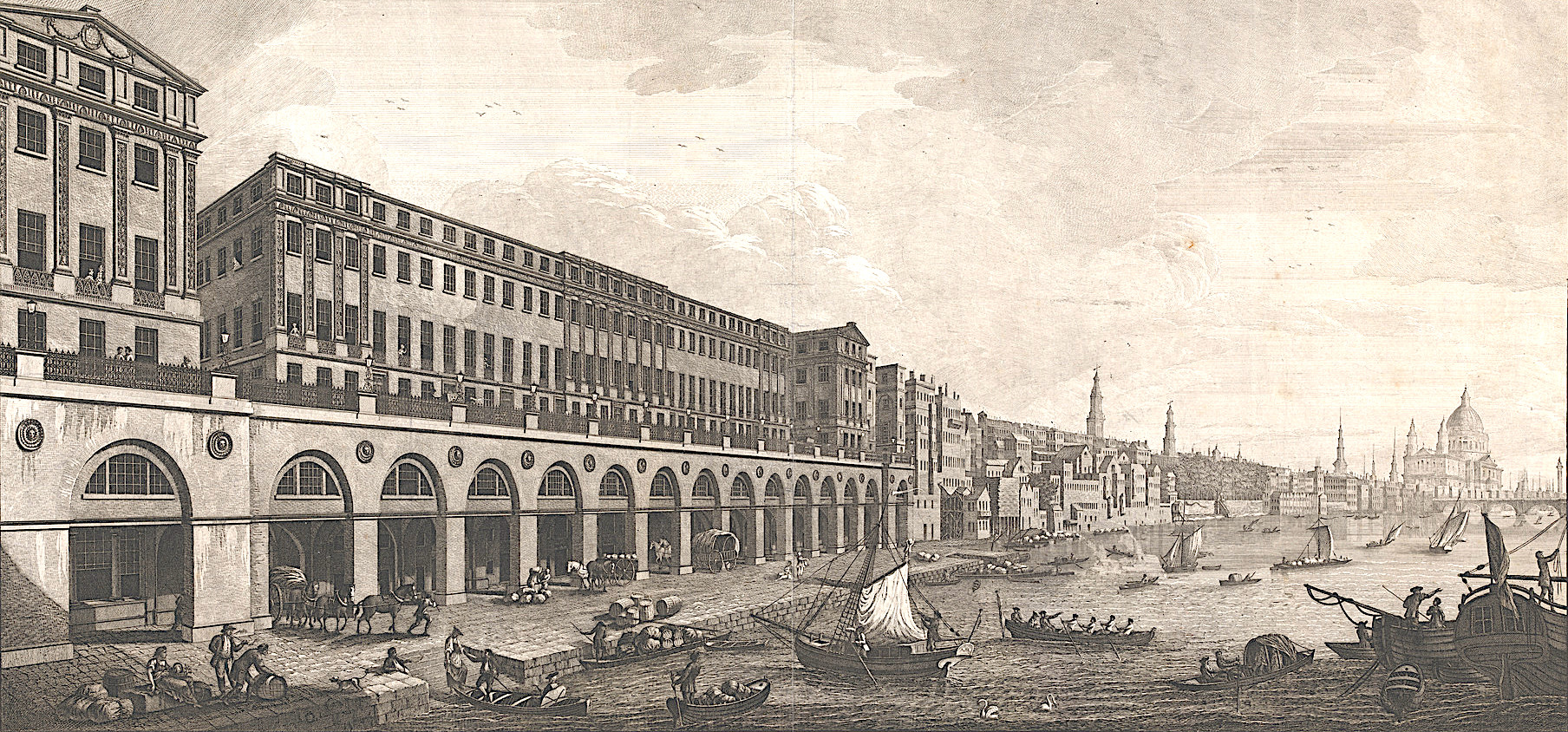
1. The quay

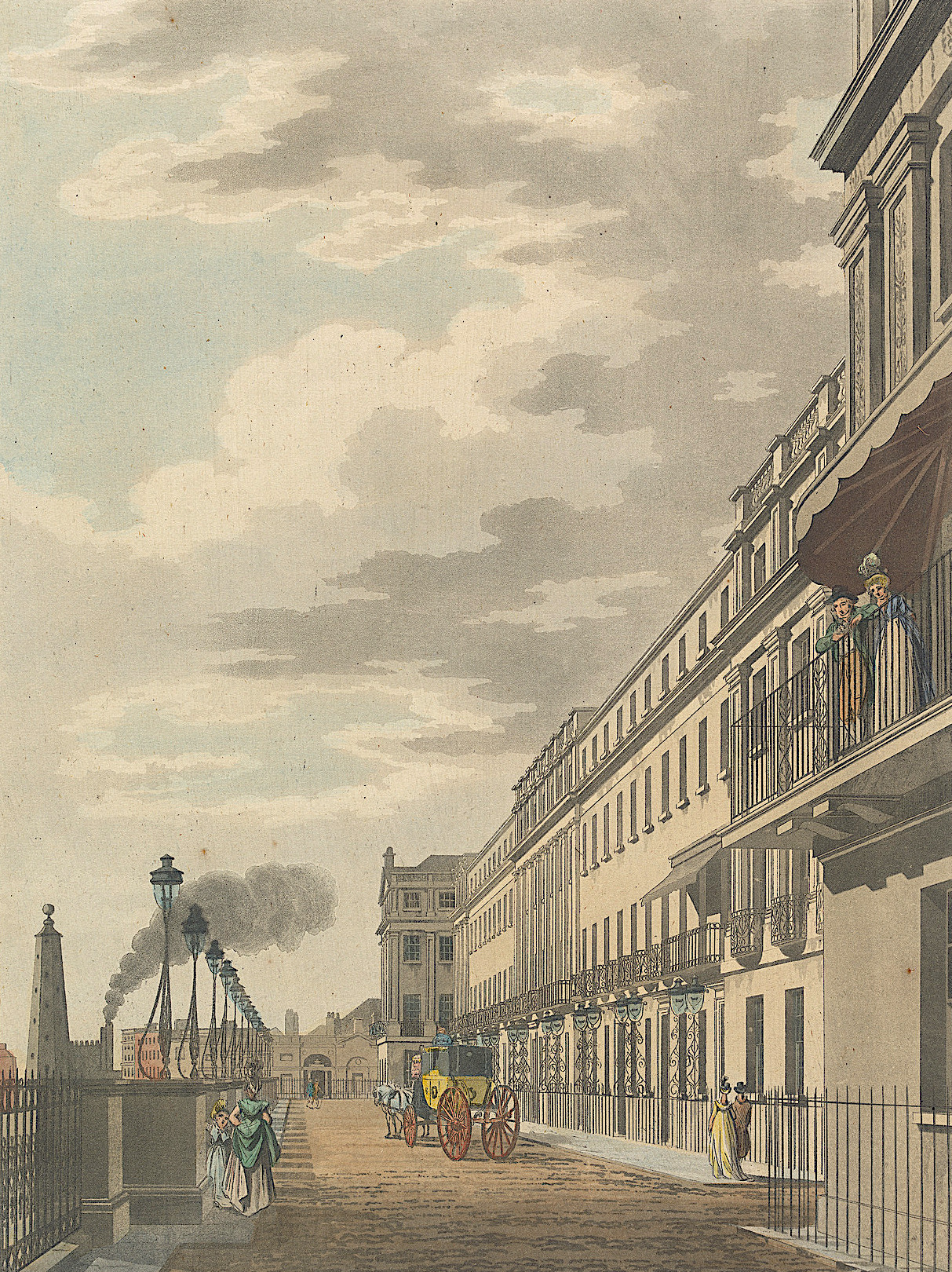
2. The terrace upstairs
1. "View of the South Front of the New Buildings called Adelphi, formerly Durham Yard and that part of the Cities of London and Westminster", 1770 (Benedetto Pastorini: Yale Center for British Art). Today, the bank of Thames has moved 150 yards to the right.
2. "Adelphi Terrace", 1795 (unknown artist: YCBA). Fashionably dressed people, neoclassical terrace, downstairs a bustling quay handles commercial traffic.

=== 19th century ===
==== Millbank ====
Road to Millbank Prison Act 1817
- Act of Parliament
- Parliament of the United Kingdom
- Long title: An Act to enable the Commissioners of His Majesty's Woods, Forests and Land Revenues to make and maintain a Road from Millbank Row, Westminster, to the Penitentiary.
- Citation: 57 Geo. 3. c. 54
- Territorial extent: United Kingdom

Dates
- Royal assent: 27 June 1817
- Commencement: 27 June 1817 (Note: The Acts of Parliament (Commencement) Act 1793.)

Status: Current legislation

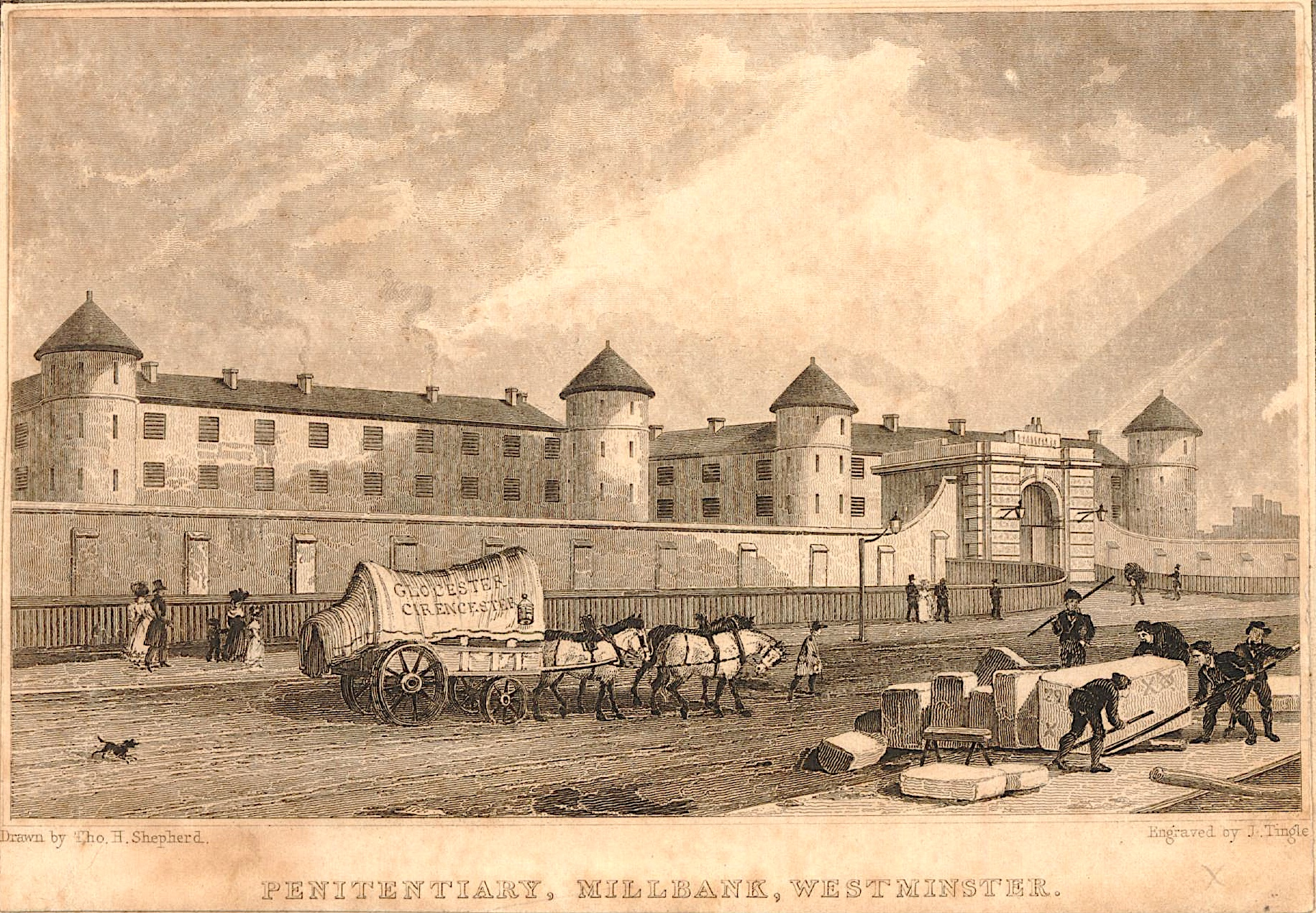
Millbank embankment. Heavy goods traffic passes the Penitentiary (today, site of Tate Britain. The Thames is behind the viewer. Notice the men with crowbars. (Shepherd and Tingle, pub. 1829: British Museum)

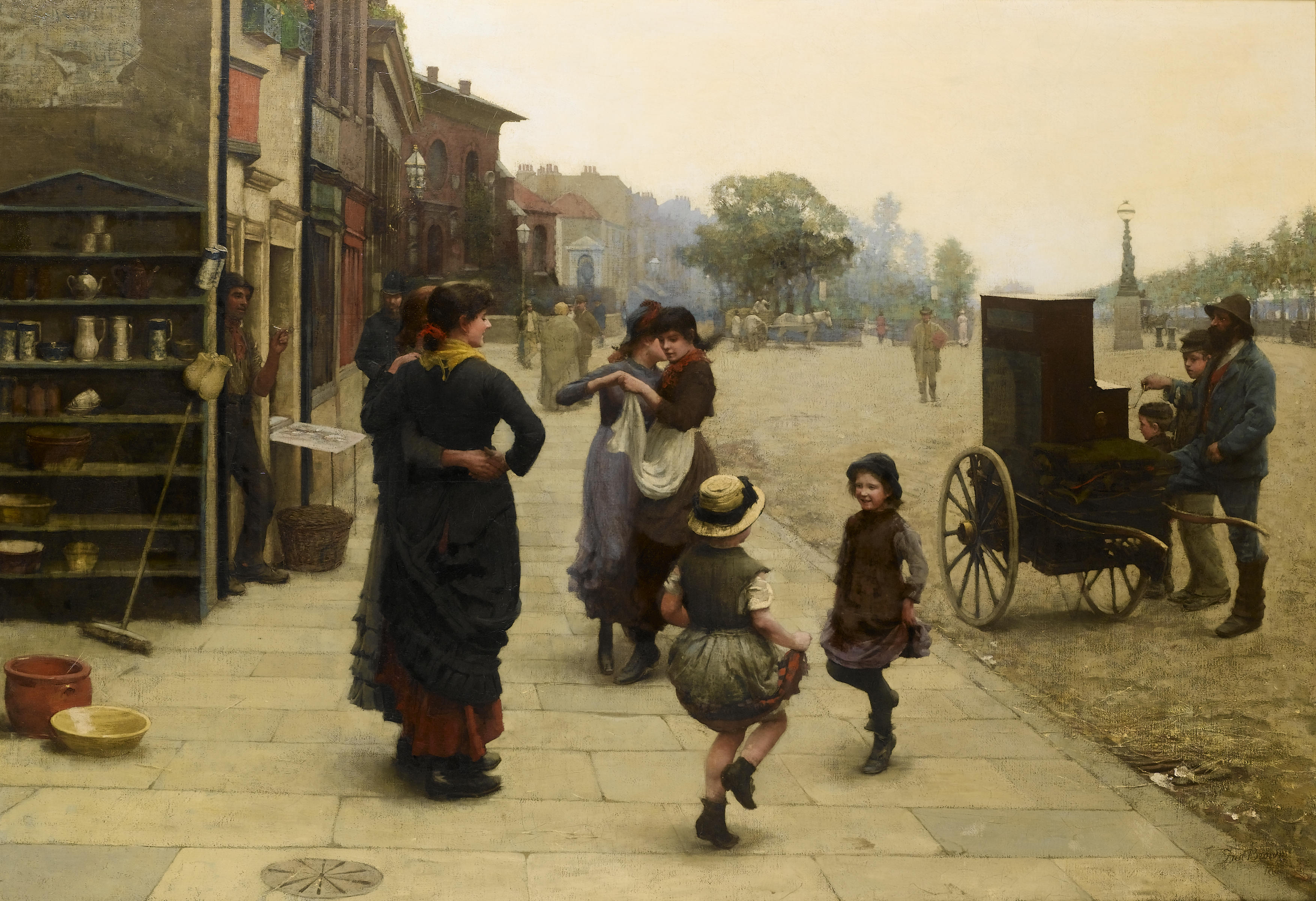
A scene on the Chelsea Embankment, 1883 (Frederick Brown: Bonhams)

The Road to Millbank Prison Act 1817 (57 Geo. 3. c. 54) authorised a road to be made along the bank from Westminster to the newly erected Millbank Penitentiary, going through land of the Earl Grosvenor. Intended to bear heavy traffic, it was embanked over 1,500 feet by Sir Robert Smirke.

==== Palace of Westminster embankment ====
After the old Houses of Parliament burnt down in 1834 they were rebuilt under Sir Charles Barry. As the first step, a new Palace of Westminster embankment was made by constructing a coffer dam and infilling back to the existing river wall. 1,200 feet long, it was engineered by Robert Walker (1840).

==== Mid-Victorian embankments ====
Apart from miscellaneous works in the London docks and Greenwich Hospital (but these totalled more than 9 miles), no significant parliamentary embankments were sanctioned until the 1860s. There was much prevarication, and opposition by vested interests. A sanitary crisis and the urgent need to build a strategic low-level sewer somewhere along the north bank of the Thames—the only alternative was the congested Strand—stimulated the decision to authorise the first of these, the Victoria Embankment.

Executed for the Metropolitan Board of Works (chief engineer Sir Joseph Bazalgette), the total extent of these mid-Victorian embankments was about 3 1/2 miles. Bazalgette's embankments were not built for the purpose of flood defence, though they might have performed that function incidentally. (The Thames in central London had defensive walls already.) Their purpose was to provide much needed public roads and open spaces, and to achieve a more uniform width. Owing to encroachments over many years, in one place the river was three times as narrow as in another. In the wide places, reduced flow caused mud to accumulate—"in a state of constant fermentation".

=== 20th century ===
The last large new embankment in London was made in 1951 in connection with the Festival of Britain (see South Bank, above).

== Bibliography ==
- Airy, George Biddell (1865). Essay on the Invasion of Britain. Nichols and Sons.
- Akeroyd, Anne V. (4 May 1972). "Archaeological and Historical Evidence for Subsidence in Southern Britain". Philosophical Transactions of the Royal Society of London. Series A, Mathematical and Physical Sciences. 272 (1221, A Discussion on Problems Associated with the Subsidence of Southeastern England (May 4, 1972)): 151–169. JSTOR 74025.
- Anderson, Adam (1787). History of Commerce. Vol. II. London: J. Walter.
- Archibald, Marion; Lang, Janet R.S.; Milne, Gustav (1995). "Four Early Medieval Coin Dies from the London Waterfront". The Numismatic Chronicle. 155. Royal Numismatic Society: 163–200. JSTOR 42668794.
- Ayre, Julian; Wroe-Brown, Robin (2015). "The Eleventh- and Twelfth- century Waterfront and Settlement at Queenhithe: Excavations at Bull Wharf, City of London". Archaeological Journal. 172 (2): 195–272. doi:10.1080/00665983.2015.1023237. S2CID 161361604.
- Baker, T F T, ed. (1998). "Stepney: Early Stepney". A History of the County of Middlesex. Vol. 11. London: British History Online.
- Bankoff, Greg (2018). "Malaria, Water Management, and Identity in the English Lowlands". Environmental History. 23 (3): 470–494. doi:10.1093/envhis/emx137.
- Bazalgette, Edward (1878). "The Victoria, Albert and Chelsea Embankments of the River Thames". In Forrest, James (ed.). Minutes of the Proceedings of the Institution of Civil Engineers. Vol. LIV (IV). London.
- Bazalgette, Joseph William (1865). On the main drainage of London: and the interception of the sewage from the River Thames. London: Institution of Civil Engineers. hdl:2027/mdp.39015020093186.
- Bazalgette, Joseph (1877). "Evidence to the Select Committee on the Thames River (Prevention of Floods) Bill". Parliamentary Papers: Reports from Committees. Vol. 10.
- Besant, Walter (1901). "The Wall". East London. New York: Century.
- Bluer, R. (1994). "Old Sun Wharf, Narrow Street, Ratcliff E14, London Borough of Tower Hamlets". MOLA (Museum of London Archaeology).
- Bosselman, Fred P. (1996). "Limitations Inherent in the Title to Wetlands at Common Law". Stanford Environmental Law Journal. 15: 247–337.
- Bosworth, G.F. (1912). Cambridge County Geographies: West London. Cambridge University Press.
- Bowen, A.J. (1972). "The Tidal Régime of the River Thames; Long-Term Trends and their Possible Causes". Philosophical Transactions of the Royal Society of London. Series A, Mathematical and Physical Sciences. 272 (1221, A Discussion on Problems Associated with the Subsidence of Southeastern England): 187–199. JSTOR 74029.
- Bowen, Anthony J.; Pinless, Sally J. (1974). "Effects of bank raising along the Thames". Coastal Engineering. ASCE Press. pp. 2471–2482. doi:10.1061/9780872621138.148.
- Bowler, E.E.M. (1968). The Reclamation and Land Use of the Thames Marshes of North West Kent (PhD). London School of Economics and Political Science/Ethos. Archived from the original on 16 May 2023.
- Buss, Rev. Septimus (1879). "Wapping". In Vivian, Arthur H. R. (ed.). Mission Life; or Home and Foreign Church Work. New Series. Vol. X Part I. London: W. Wells Gardner.
- Colquhoun, P. (1800). A Treatise on the Commerce and Police of the River Thames. London: Joseph Mawman.
- Cracknell, B.E. (1956a). "Who Built the Walls?". PLA Monthly. XXXI. Port of London Authority: 13–15.
- Cracknell, B.E. (1956b). "Rebuilding the Walls". PLA Monthly. XXXI. Port of London Authority: 356–8.
- Cracknell, B.E. (1957). "Kentish Ragstone". PLA Monthly. XXXIV. Port of London Authority: 18–20.
- Cracknell, Basil E. (1968). Portrait of London River: The Tidal Thames from Teddington to the Sea. London: Robert Hale. SBN 7091 0300 X.
- Croot, Patricia (1997). "Settlement, Tenure and Land Use in Medieval Stepney: Evidence of a Field Survey c. 1400". The London Journal. 22 (1): 1–15. doi:10.1179/ldn.1997.22.1.1.
- Cruden, Robert Peirce (1843). The History of the Town of Gravesend in the County of Kent and of the Port of London. London: William Pickering.
- Dale, Hylton B. (1922). "The Worshipful Company of the Woodmongers and the Coal Trade of London". Journal of the Royal Society of Arts. 70 (3648): 816–823. JSTOR 41355975.
- Dalrymple, Grant S. (1840). "A Description of the Coffre Dam at the site for the new Houses of Parliament". Minutes of the Proceedings. I. London: Institutiom of Civil Engineers: 18–19.
- Dalton, The Rev. Charles B. (1854). "Evidence". Report of the Commissioners Appointed to Inquire into the Existing State of the Corporation of the City of London. London: H.M.S.O.
- Devoy, R.J.N. (1979). "Flandrian Sea Level Changes and Vegetational History of the Lower Thames Estuary". Philosophical Transactions of the Royal Society of London. Series B, Biological Sciences. 285 (1010). Royal Society: 355–407. JSTOR 2418110.
- Divers, David (2000). "Excavation of Post-Medieval Wharfside Buildings, Dunbar Wharf, Narrow Street, Limehouse, 1996". Industrial Archaeology Review. XXII (1): 53–62. doi:10.1179/iar.2000.22.1.53. S2CID 110154113.
- Dobson, Mary (1980). ""Marsh Fever" – the geography of malaria in England". Journal of Historical Geography. 6 (4): 357–389. doi:10.1016/0305-7488(80)90145-0. PMID 11632265.
- Downing, Samuel (1864). "Hydraulic Earthworks: Dagenham Breach". The Practical Mechanic's Journal. IX (2d). London: Longmans, Green, Longmans, Roberts: 30–32, 58–60.
- Dugdale, William (1662). The History of Imbanking and Drayning ... Extracted From Records, Manuscripts, and other Authentick Testimonies. Alice Warren.
- Dyson, AG (1981). "The terms 'quay' and 'wharf' and the early medieval London waterfront". In Milne, Gustav; Hobley, Brian (eds.). CBA Research Report No. 41: Waterfront Archaeology in Britain and northern Europe. The Council for British Archaeology. doi:10.5284/1081765. ISBN 0-906780-08-X.
- Ehrman, John (2012). The Navy in the War of William III 1689–1697: Its State and Direction. Cambridge University Press. ISBN 978-1-107-64511-0.
- Evans, John H. (1953). "Archeological Horizons in the North Kent Marshes". Archaeologia Cantiana. 66. Kent Archeological Society: 103–146 +2 maps.
- Fletcher, Joseph (1844). "History and Statistics of the Present System of Sewerage in the Metropolis". Journal of the Statistical Society of London. 7 (2). Wiley: 143–170. doi:10.2307/2338088. JSTOR 2338088.
- Galloway, James A.; Potts, Jonathan S. (September 2007). "Marine Flooding in the Thames Estuary and Tidal River C. 1250–1450: Impact and Response". Area. 39 (3). Wiley on behalf of The Royal Geographical Society (with the Institute of British Geographers): 370–379. doi:10.1111/j.1475-4762.2007.00753.x. JSTOR 40346052.
- Galloway, James A. (2012). "'Tempests of weather and great abundance of water': the flooding of the Barking marshes in the later middle ages". In Davies, Matthew; Galloway, James A. (eds.). London and Beyond. Essays in honour of Derek Keene. University of London Press; Institute of Historical Research. pp. 67–84. ISBN 978-1-905165-70-4. JSTOR j.ctv5131n6.10.
- Galloway, James A. (2009). "Storm flooding, coastal defence and land use around the Thames estuary and tidal river c.1250–1450". Journal of Medieval History. 35 (2): 171–188. doi:10.1016/j.jmedhist.2008.12.001. S2CID 159702696.
- Galloway, James A. (2010). "'Piteous and Grievous sights': The Thames Marshes at the Close of the Middle Ages". In Galloway, James A. (ed.). Tides and Floods: New Research on London and the Tidal Thames from the Middle Ages to the Twentieth Century. London: Institute of Historical Research. ISBN 978-1-905165-59-9.
- Galloway JA (2013). "Storms, economics and environmental change in an English coastal wetland: The Thames Estuary c. 1250–1550". In Thoen, Erik, et al. (eds.). Landscapes or seascapes? The history of the coastal environment in the North Sea area reconsidered [author's preprint]. Comparative Rural History of the North Sea Area. Vol. 13. Turnhout: Brepolis. doi:10.1484/M.CORN-EB.6.09070802050003050400050800. ISBN 978-2-503-54058-0.
- Galloway JA (2015). "London and the Thames Estuary in the Later Middle Ages: Economic and Environmental Change". In Wilkin, A, et al. (eds.). Town and Country in Medieval North Western Europe: Dynamic Interactions [author's pre-print]. The Medieval Countryside. Vol. 11. Turnhout: Brepolis. pp. 119–144. doi:10.1484/M.TMC-EB.5.107296. ISBN 978-2-503-53387-2.
- Garrioch, David (2016). "1666 and London's Fire History: A Revaluation". The Historical Journal. 59 (2): 319–338. doi:10.1017/S0018246X15000382. S2CID 164070445.
- Gater, G H; Wheeler, E P, eds. (1937). "The Adelphi: General". Survey of London. Vol. 18 (St Martin-in-The-Fields II: the Strand). London County Council; British History Online.
- Goodburn, Damian; Davis, Simon (2010). "Two new Thames tide mill finds of the 690s and 1190s and a brief up-date on archaeological evidence for changing medieval tide levels". In Galloway, James A. (ed.). Tides and Floods: New research on London and the tidal Thames from the middle ages to the twentieth century. London: Institute of Historical Research. ISBN 978-1-905165-59-9.
- Gowland, G.L.; Western, A.G. (2012). "Morbidity in the Marshes: Using Spatial Epidemiology to Investigate Skeletal Evidence for Malaria in Anglo-Saxon England (AD 410–1050)". American Journal of Physical Anthropology. 147 (2): 301–311. doi:10.1002/ajpa.21648. PMID 22183814.
- Gray, D.A.; Foster, S.S.D (4 May 1972). "Urban Influences upon Groundwater Conditions in Thames Flood Plain Deposits of Central London". Philosophical Transactions of the Royal Society of London. Series A, Mathematical and Physical Sciences. 272 (1221, A Discussion on Problems Associated with the Subsidence of Southeastern England (May 4, 1972)): 245–257. JSTOR 74033.
- Grieve, Hilda (1959). The Great Tide: The story of the 1953 flood disaster in Essex. Chelmsford: County Council of Essex.
- Gull, W.W. (1854). "Condition of the Thames Marshes". The Civil Engineer and Architect's Journal. XVII. London: R. Groombridge & Sons.
- Hamilton, S.B. (1949). "Captain John Perry 1670–1732". Transactions of the Newcomen Society. 27 (1): 241–253. doi:10.1179/tns.1949.027.
- Hanley, James G. (December 2006). "The metropolitan commissioners of sewers and the law, 1812–1847". Urban History. 33 (3). Cambridge University Press: 350–368. doi:10.1017/S0963926806004020. JSTOR 44613651. S2CID 143586489.
- Hein, Carola; Schubert, Dirk (2021). "Resilience and Path Dependence: A Comparative Study of the Port Cities of London, Hamburg, and Philadelphia". Journal of Urban History. 47 (2): 389–419. doi:10.1177/0096144220925098. S2CID 220513108.
- Hobhouse, Hermione, ed. (1994). "The Isle of Dogs: Introduction". Survey of London: Volumes 43 and 44, Poplar, Blackwall and Isle of Dogs. London: British History Online.
- Home, Gordon (1926). Roman London. New York: George H. Doran.
- Honeybourne, Marjorie B. (1952). "The Abbey of St Mary Grace's, Tower Hill". Transactions of the London and Middlesex Archaeological Society. New Series. XI (1). Archived from the original on 1 December 2021.
- Hudson v. Tabor (1877). Williams, Thomas John (ed.). Weekly Reporter. Vol. XXV.
- Hutton, Charles (1815). Philosophical and Mathematical Dictionary. Vol. II. London: C. Hutton.
- J.W.B. (1861). "The River Walls of Father Thames". Once A Week. London: Bradbury & Evans. pp. 664–9.
- Janssen, Stephen Theodore (1770). A Letter to the Right Honourable William Beckford, Lord-Mayor, and Conservator of the River Thames and Waters of Medway. London: J. Wilkie.
- Johnson, David J. (1995). "An Introduction to the Topography". In Saunders, Ann (ed.). Joel Gascoyne's Engraved Maps of Stepney 1702-4. London Topographical Society. hdl:2027/inu.30000044867095.
- Kennedy, G.G.; Sandars, J.S. (1884). The Law of Land Drainage and Sewers. London: Waterlow Bros. & Layton.
- Killock, Douglas; Meddens, Frank (2005). "Pottery as plunder: a 17th-century maritime site in Limehouse, London". Post-Medieval Archaeology. 39 (1): 1–91. doi:10.1179/007943205X53363. S2CID 162245620.
- Kirk, R.E.G., ed. (1900). "Part IV. Chaucer as Commissioner for Sewers". Life-Records of Chaucer. London: Chaucer Society.
- Lavery, Sarah; Donovan, Bill (June 2005). "Flood Risk Management in the Thames Estuary Looking Ahead 100 Years". Philosophical Transactions: Mathematical, Physical and Engineering Sciences. 363 (1831, The Big Flood: North Sea storm surge (Jun., 2005)): 1455–1474. doi:10.1098/rsta.2005.1579. JSTOR 30039664. PMID 16191661. S2CID 26330471.
- Lewin, J.; Lavery, S. (2002). "Maintaining the Thames tidal defences in a century of climate change". In Tedd, Paul (ed.). Reservoirs in a Changing World. London: Thomas Telford. ISBN 0-7277-3139-4.
- Llewellyn Smith, Hubert (1939). History of East London. London: Macmillan.
- Lyon, Bryce (1957). "Medieval Real Estate Developments and Freedom". The American Historical Review. 63 (1): 47–61. doi:10.2307/1847111. JSTOR 1847111.
- Maitland, William (1756). The History and Survey of London from its Foundation to the Present Time. Vol. II. London: Osborne and Shipton.
- Marsden, P. (1994). Ships of the Port of London: First to eleventh centuries AD. English Heritage. ISBN 978-1-84802-206-5.
- Milne, Gustav (1981). "Medieval riverfront reclamation in London". In Milne, Gustav; Hobley, Brian (eds.). CBA Research Report No. 41: Waterfront Archaeology in Britain and northern Europe. The Council for British Archaeology. doi:10.5284/1081765. ISBN 0-906780-08-X.
- Milne, Gustav (1985). "Port of Roman London" (PDF). ancientportsantiques.com.
- Milne, Gustav; Bates, Martin; Webber, Mike D. (1997). "Problems, potential and partial solutions: An archaeological study of the tidal Thames, England". World Archaeology. 29 (1): 130–146. doi:10.1080/00438243.1997.9980367.
- Milne, Gustav (2003). The Port of Medieval London. Tempus. ISBN 0-7524-2544-7.
- Milne, Gustav (2015). "The Changing River Thames: Some Thoughts from an Archaeological Perspective". The London Journal. 40 (3): 211–217. doi:10.1179/1749632215Y.0000000011. ISSN 0305-8034.
- Moore, Lewis (1865). "On the Erith Explosion, and the Repair of the Thames Embankment". Society of Engineers Transactions for 1864. London: E & FN Spon: 183–199.
- Moore, Stuart A. (1888). A History of the Foreshore (3 ed.). London: Stevens and Haynes.
- Morris, Derek; Cozens, Kenneth (2013). "The Shadwell Waterfront in the Eighteenth Century". The Mariner's Mirror. 99 (1): 86–91. doi:10.1080/00253359.2013.767001. S2CID 161146383.
- Nunn, Patrick D. (1983). "The Development of the River Thames in Central London during the Flandrian". Transactions of the Institute of British Geographers. 8 (2): 187–213. JSTOR 622110.
- Ormsby, H. (1922). "London and Westminster Contrasted". The Geographical Teacher. 11 (4). Geographical Association: 251–260. JSTOR 40555607.
- Owen, A.E.B. (1967). "Records of Commissions of Sewers". History. 52 (174). Wiley: 35–38. doi:10.1111/j.1468-229X.1967.tb01189.x. JSTOR 24406262.
- Parliamentary Gazetteer. Vol. IV. London: Fullarton. 1847.
- Perry, Capt. John (1721). An Account of the Stopping of Daggenham Breach. Benj. Tooke.
- Phillpotts, Christopher (1999). "Landscape into townscape: an historical and archaeological investigation of the Limehouse area, east London". Landscape History. 21 (1): 59–76. doi:10.1080/01433768.1999.10594513.
- Pearson, Robin (2017) [First published 2004]. "Fire insurance markets of Georgian London". Insuring the Industrial Revolution: Fire Insurance of Great Britain, 1700–1850. New York: Routledge. ISBN 978-0-7546-3363-1.
- Powell, W R, ed. (1966). "Dagenham: Economic history and local government". A History of the County of Essex. Victoria County History. Vol. 5. London: British History Online. pp. 281–294.
- Raithby, John, ed. (1811). "A General Act concerning the Commissions of Sewers to be directed in all Parts within this Realm (23 Hen. VIII c.5)". The Statutes at Large. Vol. III. Eyre and Strahan.
- Raithby, John, ed. (1819). "An Act to enable the Commissioners of His Majesty's Woods, Forests and Land Revenues to make and maintain a Road from Millbank Row, Westminster, to the Penitentiary (57 Geog. III c.54)". The Statutes of the United Kingdom. Vol. VII.
- Raithby, John, ed. (1773). "An Act for enabling certain Persons to inclose and embank Part of the River Thames, adjoining to 2 Yard, Salisbury Street, Cecil Street, and Beaufort Buildings, in the County of Middlesex.". The statutes at large, from the eleventh year of King George the Third, to the thirteenth year of King George the Third, inclusive. The Statutes at Large. Vol. IX. London: Charles Eyre and William Strahan. pp. 211–213.
- Rammell, Thomas Webster (1854). "Condition of the Thames Marshes". The Civil Engineer and Architect's Journal. XVII. London: R. Groombridge & Sons.
- Redman, John Baldry (1877). "The River Thames". Minutes of the Proceedings of the Institution of Civil Engineers. XLIX: 67–158. doi:10.1680/imotp.1877.22501.
- Redman (1878). "Embankments of the River Thames". In Forrest, James (ed.). Minutes of the Proceedings of the Institution of Civil Engineers. Vol. LIV (IV). London.
- Reiter, P. (2000). "From Shakespeare to Defoe: malaria in England in the Little Ice Age". Emerging Infectious Diseases. 6 (1): 1–11. doi:10.3201/eid0601.000101. PMC 2627969. PMID 10653562.
- Richardson, Guildford Barker (1877). "Evidence to the Select Committee on the Thames River (Prevention of Floods) Bill". Parliamentary Papers: Reports from Committees. Vol. 10.
- Richardson, H.G. (1919). "The Early History of Commissions of Sewers". The English Historical Review. 34 (135). Oxford University Press: 385–393. doi:10.1093/ehr/XXXIV.CXXXV.385. JSTOR 551072.
- Roberts, Howard; Godfrey, Walter H, eds. (1951). Survey of London: Volume 23, Lambeth: South Bank and Vauxhall. London: British History Online.
- Roche, Charles Mills (1877). "Evidence to the Select Committee on the Thames River (Prevention of Floods) Bill". Parliamentary Papers: Reports from Committees. Vol. 10.
- Ruffhead, ed. (1769). "Magna Charta, The Great Charter". The Statutes at Large. Vol. I. London: Law Printer to the King's Most Excellent Majesty.
- Schofield, John (2018). "Industries and trades on the waterfront". In Schofield, John; Blackmore, Lyn; Pearce, Jacqui; Dyson, Tony (eds.). London's Waterfront 1100–1666: excavations in Thames Street, London, 1974–84. Archaeopress Publishing in association with the City of London Archaeological Trust. ISBN 9781784918385.
- Scott, Beccy; Shaw, Andrew (2009). "The quiet man of Kent: the contribution of F.C.J. Spurrell to the early years of Palaeolithic archaeology". In Hosfield, R.; Wenban-Smith, F.; Pope, M. (eds.). Great Prehistorians: 150 Years of Palaeolithic Research, 1859–2009 (Special Volume 30 of Lithics: The Journal of the Lithic Studies Society). London: Lithic Studies Society. pp. 53–64. Archived from the original on 14 July 2020.
- Sharp, Granville (1771). Remarks Concerning the Encroachments on the River Thames near Durham-Yard. London: G. Bigg.
- Sidell, Jane; Wilkinson, Keith; Scaife, Robert; Cameron, Nigel (2000). The Holocene Evolution of the London Thames. Archaeological Excavations (1991–1998) for the London Underground Limited Jubilee Line Extension. MoLAS Monograph 5. Museum of London Archaeology Service. ISBN 1-901992-10-1.
- Sidell, Jane (2003). "The London Thames: a decade of research into the river and its floodplain". In Howard, Andrew J.; Mackling, M.G.; Passmore, D.G. (eds.). Alluvial Archaeology in Europe: Proceedings of an International Conference, Leeds, 18-19 December 2000. CRC Press. ISBN 9789058095619.
- Smiles, Samuel (1861). The Lives of the Engineers. Vol. I. London: John Murray.
- Spurrell, F.C.J. (September 1885). "Early Sites and Embankments on the Margins of the Thames Estuary" (PDF). The Archaeological Journal: 269–303 + 2 maps.
- Spurrell, F.C.J. (1889). "On the Estuary of the Thames and its Alluvium". Proceedings of the Geologists' Association. 11 (4): 210–230. doi:10.1016/S0016-7878(89)80036-7.
- Spurrell, F.C.J. (1908). "On the Embankments of the Thames in Kent". In Page, William (ed.). The Victoria History of the County of Kent. Vol. I. London: Constable.
- Steckley, George F. (2003). "Collisions, Prohibitions, and the Admiralty Court in Seventeenth-Century London". Law and History Review. 21 (1): 41–68. doi:10.2307/3595068.
- Steyne, Hanna (2013). "Stinking Foreshore to Tree Lined Avenue: Investigating the Riverine Lives Impacted by the Construction of the Thames Embankments in Victorian London" (PDF). Papers from the Institute of Archaeology. 23 (1): 1–11.
- Stock, M.P. (1857). "Baths and Washhouses". The London Quarterly Review. VII: 182–200.
- Stow, John (1598). A suruay of London Contayning the originall, antiquity, increase, moderne estate, and description of that citie. John Wolfe printer to the honorable citie of London.
- Tyler, Kieron (2001). "The excavation of an Elizabethan/Stuart waterfront site on the north bank of the River Thames at Victoria Wharf, Narrow Street, Limehouse, London E14". Post-Medieval Archaeology. 35 (1): 53–95. doi:10.1179/pma.2001.003. S2CID 161733828.
- Uncles, R.J.; Mitchell, S.B. (2011). "Turbidity in the Thames Estuary: How turbid do we expect it to be?". Hydrobiologia. 672 (1): 91–103. doi:10.1007/s10750-011-0757-6. ISSN 0018-8158. S2CID 39364929.
- Van Dam, Petra J.E.M. (2002). "Ecological Challenges, Technological Innovations: The Modernization of Sluice Building in Holland, 1300–1600". Technology and Culture. 43 (3, Water Technology in the Netherlands). The Johns Hopkins University Press and the Society for the History of Technology: 500–520. doi:10.1353/tech.2002.0144. JSTOR 25147957. S2CID 109478393.
- Vanderdelf's Act (1536). "An Act concerning the assurance of the moiety of lands lately inned by Cornelius Vanderdelf unto Richard Hill and his heirs". The Statutes of the Realm printed by Command of King George III. London: Dawsons of Pall Mall (1963 reprint).
- Walford, Edward (1884). Greater London: A Narrative of Its History, Its People, and Its Places. Vol. I.
- Walker, James (1842). "On the improvement of the Thames". The Nautical Magazine and Naval Chronicle. London: Simpkin Marshall: 530–536, 605–615.
- Whitaker, W. (1889). The Geology of London and of Part of the Thames Valley. (Explanation of Sheets 1, 2, and 7.). Vol. I. HMSO.
- Willmoth, Frances (1998). "Dugdale's History of Imbanking and Drayning: a 'Royalist' Antiquarian in the Sixteen‐Fifties". Historical Research. 71 (176). Oxford University Press: 281–302. doi:10.1111/1468-2281.00065.
