= Town of Ramsgate =

Pub in London, England

Coordinates: 51°30′12.5″N 0°3′43.4″W

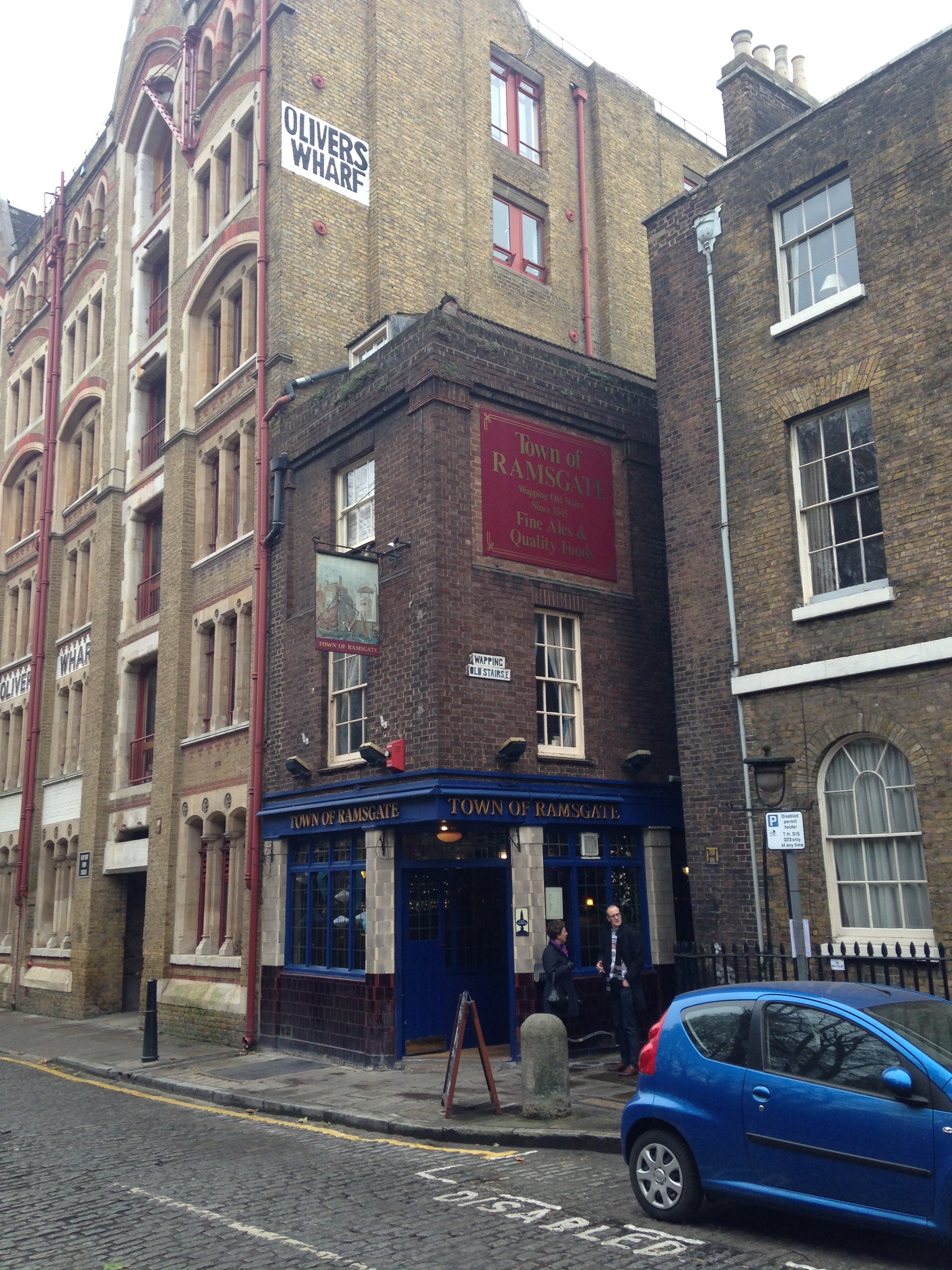
Pictured in 2013

The Town of Ramsgate public house is located at the centre of the ancient hamlet of Wapping in the London Borough of Tower Hamlets. It features in several books about London inns where it is rated as "a notable specimen of a waterman's tavern."

== Construction ==
Although the present building dates back to 1758, the National Monuments Record have stated that it was constructed on earlier foundations. Today it benefits from a Grade II listing, awarded primarily for the pub's interior; the "beamed ceilings, benches, plank paneling and engraved glass screen" but also for its "group value and historical associations."

== Nearby ==
The pub is located between Wapping Old Stairs and Oliver's Wharf.

To the left of the inn are the Georgian houses of Pier Head which were built in 1811 for the employees of the London Dock Company. The railed gardens cover the former entrance to Wapping Basin. Opposite the pub is St. John's Church. Built in 1790, all that remains is the tower, as the main body of the church was destroyed during the Blitz. To the right is Oliver's Wharf.

== See also ==
- Prospect of Whitby
- List of restaurants in London
