= Ramsgate (disambiguation) =

Ramsgate is a seaside town on the South coast of England.

Ramsgate may also refer to:

- Ramsgate, KwaZulu-Natal, a town in South Africa
- Ramsgate, New South Wales, a suburb of Sydney, Australia

== See also ==
- Town of Ramsgate, a pub in Wapping, East London, England
