= London stock brick =

Type of 19th century handmade brick

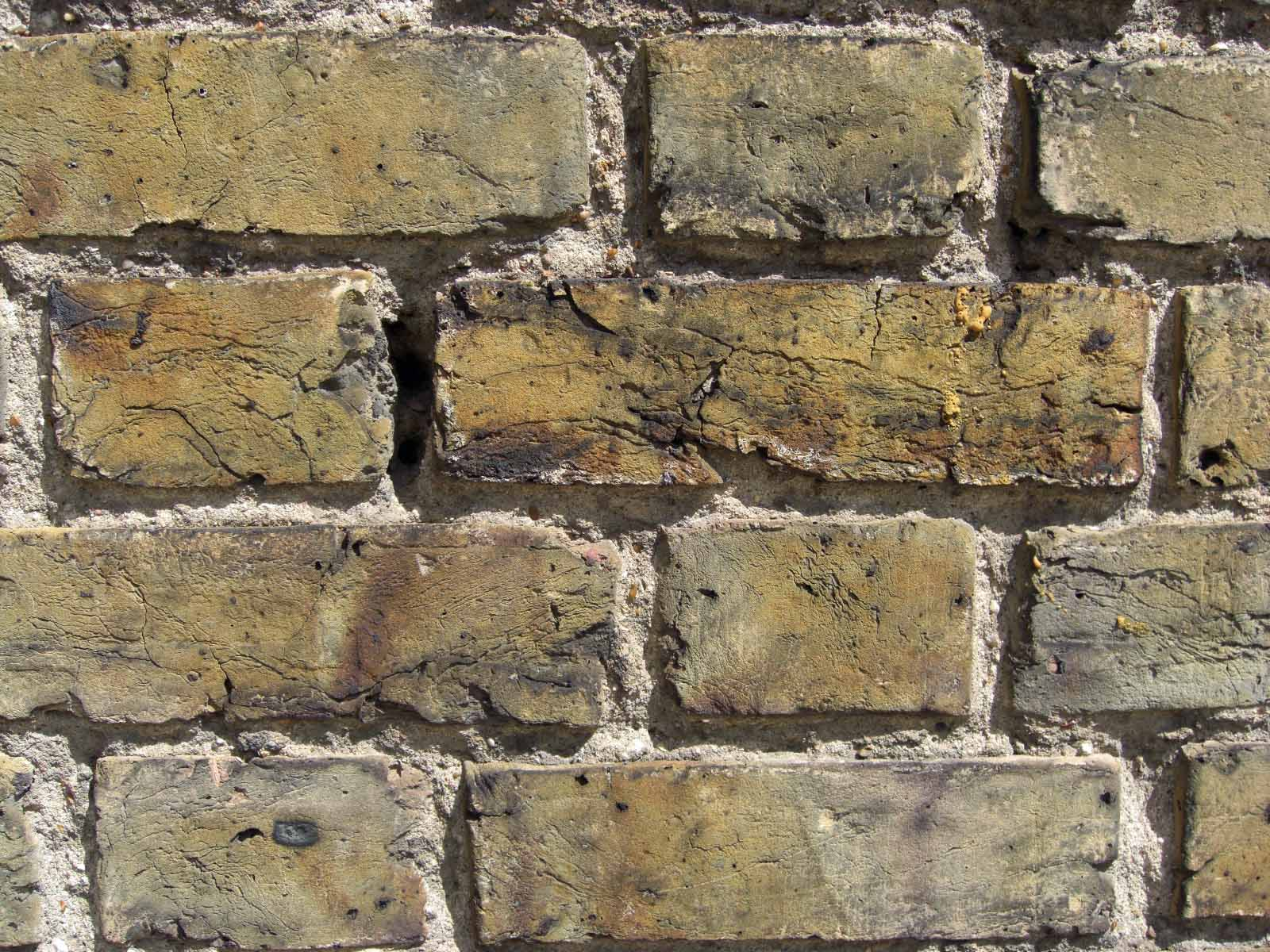
London stock bricks

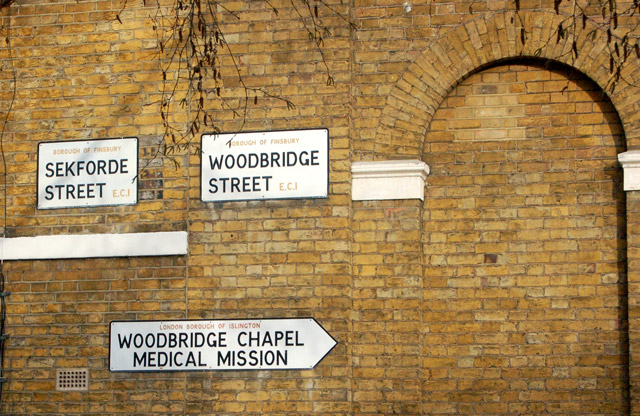
A stock brick wall in Islington

London stock brick is the type of handmade brick which was used for the majority of building work in London and South East England until the increase in the use of Flettons and other machine-made bricks in the early 20th century. Its distinctive yellow colour is due to the addition of chalk. Another important admixture is 'spanish', which is made up of ash and cinders from incinerated waste and rubbish. The spanish ignites on firing and reduces fuel costs at the firing stage.

London Stocks are still made in comparatively small quantities in traditional brickworks, mainly in Kent and Sussex, for heritage work, and machine-made versions are available for use where a cheaper approximation to the traditional product is acceptable. Red stock bricks are also fairly common, but only the yellow or brown bricks are usually known as London stocks.

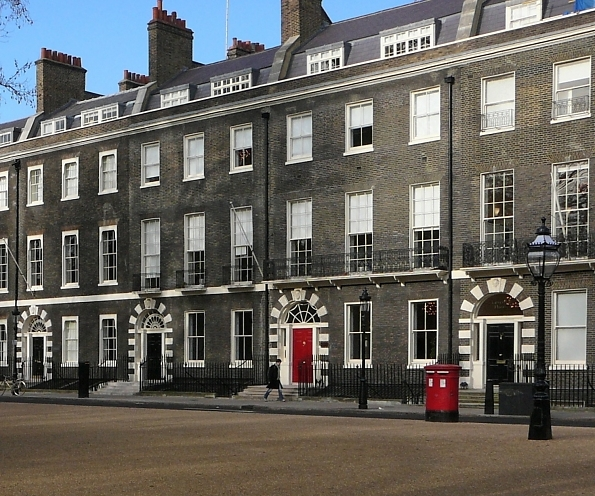
Georgian houses in Bedford Square, London, built from London stock bricks showing discoloration due to atmospheric pollution

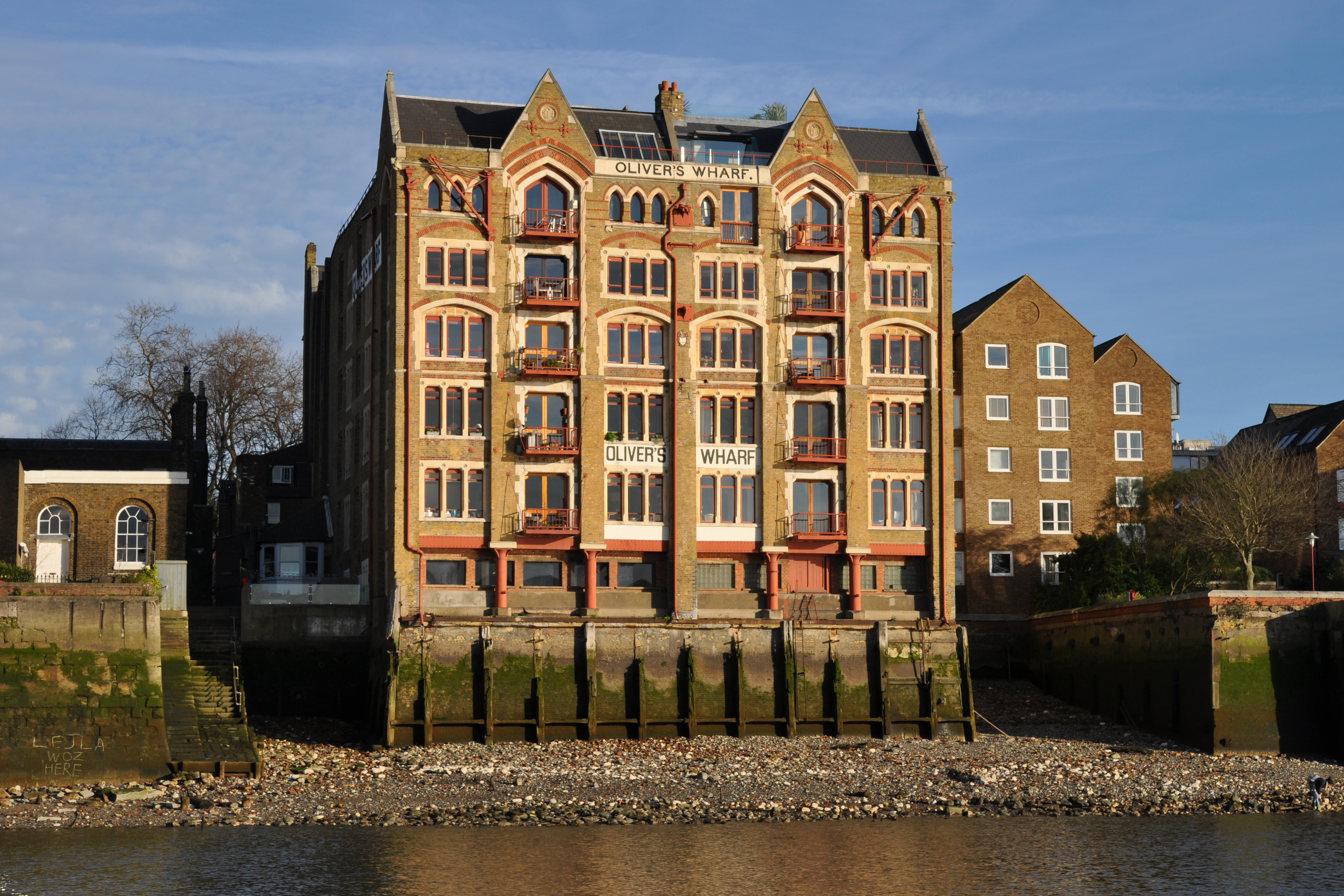
Oliver's Wharf, a Victorian warehouse, showing yellow London stock brick

== History ==
During the 19th century, the fields around London were built up with new housing. Commonly, a field would be excavated to expose the brickearth (which was found overlying the London clay subsoil), which was then turned into bricks on the site by moulding and firing them. The bricks would then be used to build houses adjacent to the brick field – transport was expensive. Once the building work was nearing completion the brick field would be levelled and built upon while a new brick field further out would supply the bricks.

Bricks were also made in clay areas surrounding London. The opening of the Grand Junction Canal to the River Thames at Brentford in 1794 and its Paddington Arm in 1801, enabled the bulk transportation of stock bricks into London from west Middlesex, particularly from the Cowley, Yiewsley and Starveall areas. By the 1890s it is estimated 100 million bricks per year were being produced in west Middlesex, supplying Victorian London's demand for building materials.

In December 1882, the Slough Arm of the canal opened, enabling the transportation of bricks made in Buckinghamshire. Bricks were also made in Kent, Essex and other areas where they could be imported to London by rail. In Stock, Essex, there is a common belief that 'stock bricks' originated there; bricks were certainly made there, but the name is a coincidence, stock being a common English word with many meanings and also a common place-name element.

Air pollution in London during the 19th century and early 20th century commonly caused the bricks to receive a sooty deposition over time, turning the bricks greyish or even black, but the removal of contaminants from the air following the passing of the Clean Air Act in 1956, has enabled older buildings to be cleaned and new buildings to retain their natural colour.

In the 19th century, London stock bricks were available in a variety of grades priced according to their consistency and their regularity of shape and colour. High-grade bricks were used for face work and lower grades were bought for use as internal bricks. It seems to have been common practice for a high grade brick to be broken in half so that it could be used twice, each end appearing as a header in the wall. This cost-cutting would make a wall deficient in bonding bricks, i.e. bricks tying the outer skin of brickwork back to the inner part of the wall, often resulting in the outer skin peeling away from the inner and bulging out. This issue, known as snapped or snap headers, leads to walls which need to be repaired either by rebuilding or by fitting various types of proprietary tie.

== Stock bricks ==
The term 'stock brick' can either indicate the common type of brick stocked in a locality, or a handmade brick made using a stock. A stock or stock board is an iron-faced block of wood fixed to the surface of the moulder's bench. The brick mould fits over the stock; the brick maker fills the mould with prepared clay and cuts it off with a wire level with the top of the mould, before turning out the 'green' brick onto a wooden board called a pallet for drying and firing.

Reclaimed London stock bricks are sought after for decorative and conservation use. The mortar usually used with them in original construction was lime mortar, which is much softer and weaker than modern cement based mortar and can be cleaned off second-hand bricks easily leaving them ready for re-use. Nevertheless, the supply of second-hand stocks cannot always meet the demand, and 'new' second-hand stocks can be obtained from builders' merchants. Unfortunately, some of the new products are painted white or black to simulate the whitewashed or soot blackened surfaces often encountered in the real second hand bricks – making them unsuitable for face-work.

== Mortar ==
Most London stock bricks are more or less porous, as is the lime mortar in which they have traditionally been laid. The pointing should be flush pointing so that rain water can run down off the surface and not be encouraged to soak into the wall as is the case with recessed or struck pointing. When used in this way the brickwork does not get wet all the way through and is thus effectively waterproof.

Lime mortar tends to weaken in London's acidic rainwater and needs repointing several times a century. It has been common since the widespread availability of Portland cement to see London stock brickwork repointed using much stronger cement mortar. As repointing consists of replacing the outer 20–40 mm of mortar, the effect of this is to make the outer 20–40 mm of the brickwork harder and stronger than the interior of the wall. This can lead to spalling of the brick surface, and can also encourage the bulging associated with snapped headers.

== See also ==
- Brick
- Face brick where no plastering is specified
- London Brick Company
