= Dead End Kids (firefighters) =

Firefighters during the London Blitz

The Dead End Kids were a group of firefighters during the London Blitz during World War II.

== History ==
The Dead End Kids were a group of poor children and teenagers organised by Patrick "Patsy" Duggan, a 16 year old dock worker and the son of a Poplar bin man, to fight fires in Wapping, East End of London during the London Blitz. Some of the members had returned to London from their evacuation to the countryside during the "Phoney War." The group took their name from the Dead End Kids street gang from 1930s and 1940s films.

Duggan, with recruits as young as 10 years old, equipped themselves with tools such as buckets of sand and rope to fight fires and help people in distress during the air raids of the Blitz. They formed teams of four to undertake their volunteer duties and would force open doors to rescue people trapped in buildings. Their "headquarters" was in an annex at Watson's Wharf Shelter.

The London Fire Journal, reported an account by an eye witness, who said of the Dead End Kids that: "they rushed up the stairs, ready it seemed to eat fires .. emerging from the building, some of them with their tatty clothes smouldering." A pensioner described how one of the Dead End Kids carried her out of a burning building in her armchair and the group were also credited with rescuing 230 people from a damaged air raid shelter.

Two of the Dead End Kids, Bert Eden and Ronnie Eyres, who were 16 years old and 18 years old respectively, died by being crushed by a wall while they were putting out incendiary bombs. They were buried at Woodgrange Cemetery. Duggan was also injured on this occasion, and later tried to obtain posthumous honours for his friends. Eyres had been accepted into the Royal Air Force (RAF) just before his death.

Other known members were Shamus O'Brien (who was ten years old in April 1941) and Maureen Duggan.

== Legacy ==
Bernard Ashley's 2015 book Dead End Kids: Heroes of the Blitz was inspired by the story of the Dead of Kids.

Peter Ackroyd has referred to the group in his history of London as the "unofficial fight fighters of the Blitz."

In 2025, the Dead End Kids featured in the third episode of Ruth Goodman and Rob Rinder's channel five history programme "In Rich Times, Poor Times."
