= Wapping (painting) =

Painting by James McNeill Whistler

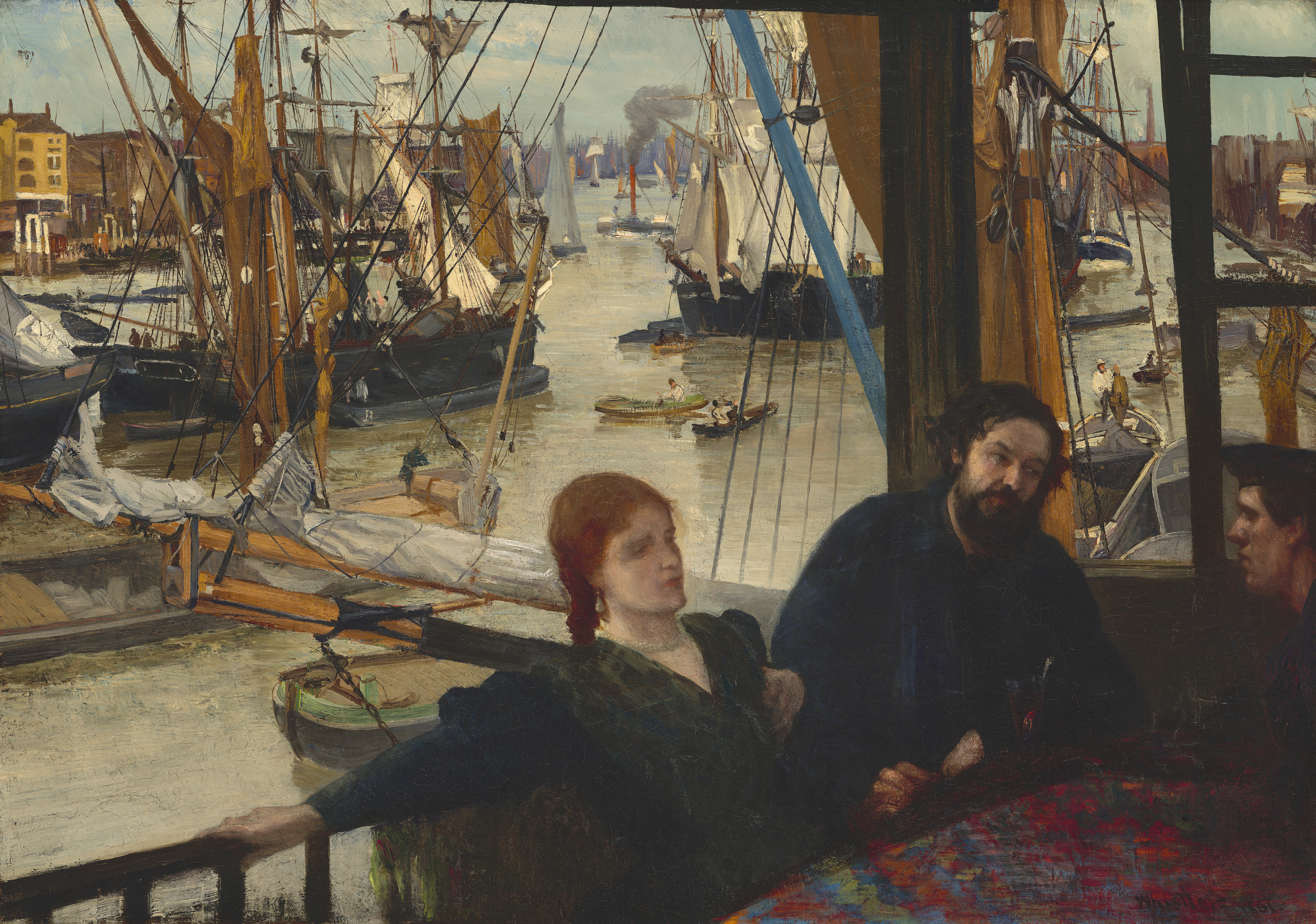
- Artist: James McNeill Whistler
- Year: 1860-64
- Type: Oil on canvas, genre painting
- Dimensions: 72 cm × 101.8 cm (28 in × 40.1 in)
- Location: National Gallery of Art, Washington D.C.

Wapping is an 1864 oil painting by the American artist James McNeill Whistler. It shows a riverside scene in the Rotherhithe district of East London. It captures a view of the River Thames crowded with ships and warehouses, a common feature in his early etchings. It grew out of an etching he had previously made and represented the most complex painting he had yet attempted.

Whistler began the painting that he called Rotherhithe in 1860 when he was living in Wapping, directly across thr river, before moving west to Chelsea. He originally conceived it depicting the discussion between a prostitute and her client. The woman was modelled by his frequent collaborator Joanna Hiffernan. One of the men was his friend and fellow artist Alphonse Legros. He later resumed work on the painting and made some adjustments such as closing the previously open blouse, in order to make it less clear that she was a prostitute. He was now more intestedin the arrangement of the three figures thana narrative.

The picture was displayed at the Royal Academy Exhibition of 1864 held at the National Gallery in London. Whistler sold the work for £350 to a regular patron of his Thomas Winans. Today the painting is in the collection of the National Art Gallery in Washington, which acquired it in 1982.

== See also ==
- List of paintings by James McNeill Whistler

== Bibliography ==
- Jacobi, Carol (ed.) James McNeill Whistler. Tate Publishing, 2026.
- Spencer, Robin. Whistler. 1993.
- Sutherland, Daniel E. Whistler: A Life for Art's Sake. Yale University Press, 2014.
