= Prospect of Whitby =

Pub in London, England

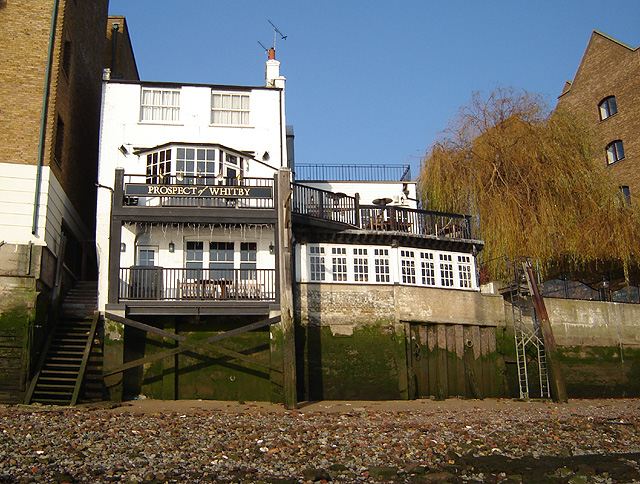
- Pictured from the Thames foreshore in 2006
- Interactive map of Prospect of Whitby

Restaurant information
- Established: c. 1520
- Food type: Pub fare, English
- Dress code: Casual
- Location: 57 Wapping Wall, London, E1W 3SJ, England
- Coordinates: 51°30′26″N 0°03′04″W
- Website: www.greeneking-pubs.co.uk/pubs/greater-london/prospect-of-whitby/

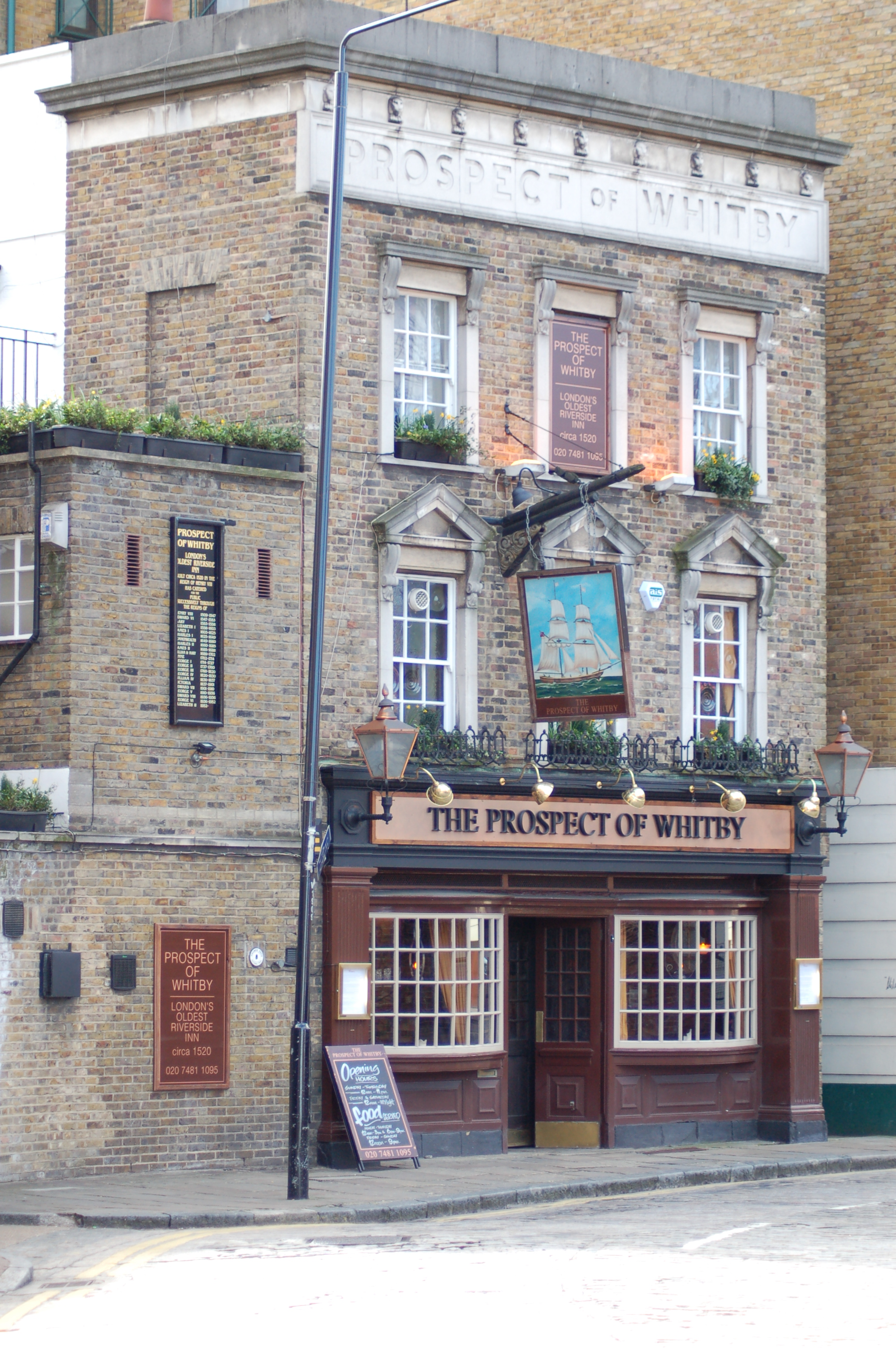
The Prospect of Whitby, street view (2007)

The Prospect of Whitby is a historic public house on the northern bank of the River Thames at Wapping, in the East End of London and the London Borough of Tower Hamlets. It lays claim to being on the site of the oldest riverside tavern, dating from around 1520.

== History ==
The tavern was formerly known as The Pelican and, later, as the Devil’s Tavern, on account of its dubious reputation. All that remains from the building's earliest period is the 400-year-old stone floor. The pub features 18th-century panelling and a 19th-century facade. The pub has a pewter-top bar and is decorated with many nautical objects. In former times it was a meeting place for sailors, smugglers, cutthroats and footpads. Sir Hugh Willoughby sailed from here in 1553 in a disastrous attempt to discover the North-East Passage to China.

According to John Stow, it was "The usual place for hanging of pirates and sea-rovers, at the low-water mark, and there to remain till three tides had overflowed them". Execution Dock was actually by Wapping Old Stairs and was generally used for pirates. In the eighteenth century, the first fuchsia plant in the United Kingdom was sold at the pub.

Views from the pub were sketched by both Turner and Whistler.

Following a fire in the early 19th century, the tavern was rebuilt and renamed The Prospect of Whitby, after a Tyne collier that used to berth next to the pub. The ship brought sea coal from Newcastle upon Tyne to London. Circa 1826 the tavern was named Manns Prospect of Whitby by James Mann who had taken control of Mann, Crossman & Paulin Ltd. The Prospect was listed as a Grade II listed building in December 1950. The pub underwent a renovation in 1951 to double the interior space. In January 1953, the pub was raided by armed robbers. The pub has been visited by Princess Margaret and Prince Rainier III of Monaco.

== In popular culture ==
There is a scene in the 1956 film D-Day the Sixth of June, starring Robert Taylor and Richard Todd, in which Taylor's character is seen with Dana Wynter's character having drinks in the pub during the Second World War.

The video for Gilbert O'Sullivan's 1970 hit "Nothing Rhymed" was shot here, as he was living close by in a bedsit when he wrote the song.

The pub features briefly in an episode of Only Fools And Horses. When Uncle Albert goes missing in one episode Del Boy and Rodney travel around London looking for him. Nicholas Lyndhurst is shown in one scene walking out of the pub.

In the comicbook The League of Extraordinary Gentlemen Mina Harker pauses in front of the pub and says it brings back memories. She is referring to the beaching of the Demeter at Whitby in the novel Dracula.

The pub is also featured in Vercors's novel Les Animaux dénaturés.

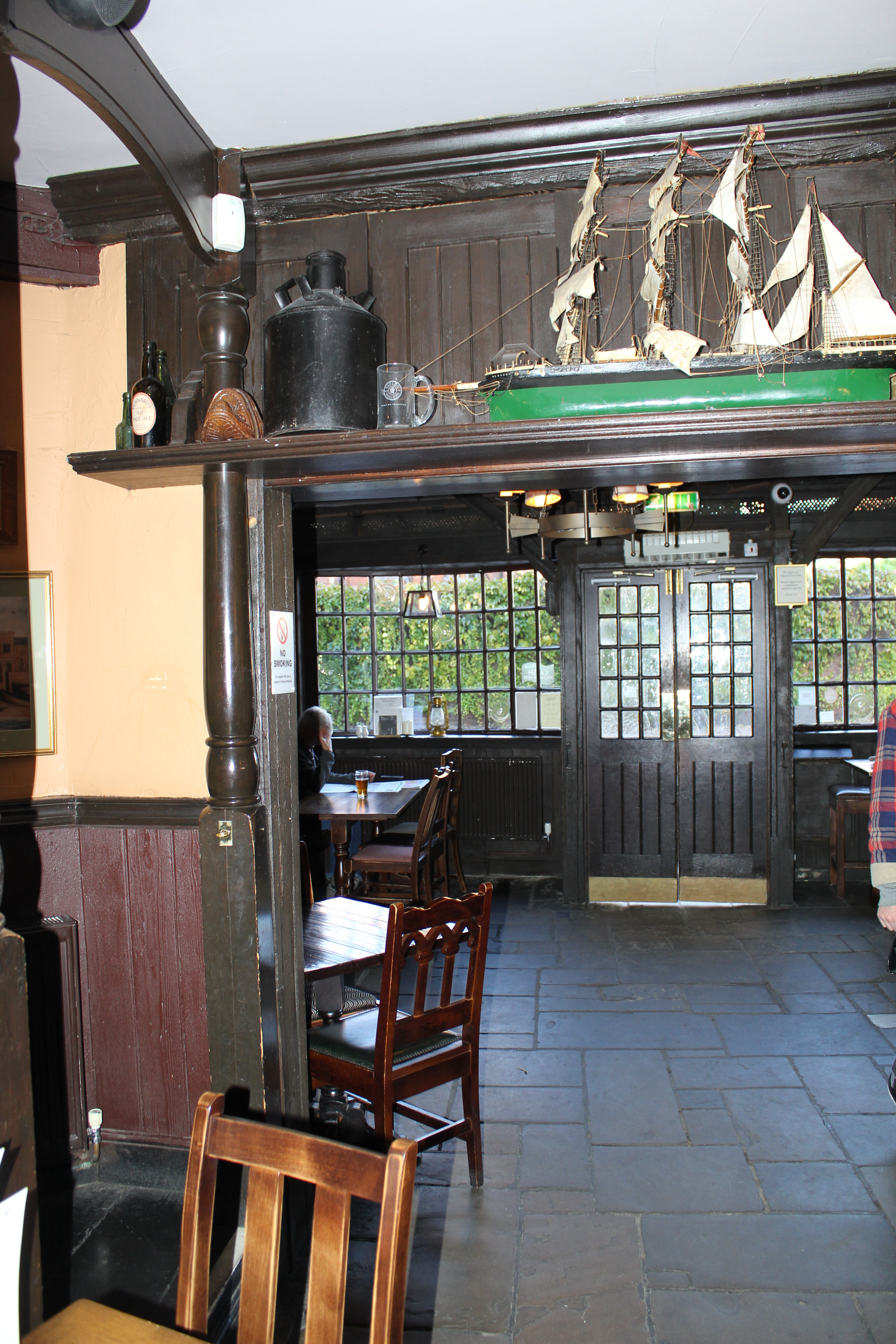
Interior, 2013

The pub also appears in Whitechapel, Series 4, Episode 4, in which the body of a victim is discovered on the Thames shoreline. DS Miles briefly explains its history to DI Chandler.

The pub features in several of Anna Harrington's Regency-era romance novels, most notably in An Unexpected Earl and An Extraordinary Lord, both in the "Lords of the Armory" series. The recurring comic character Hugh Whitby in Harrington's "Capturing the Carlisles" series was named after the pub.

The pub also features in several of the Charles Holborne legal crime thrillers by former barrister, Simon Michael, particularly Corrupted, in which the protagonist and his family work as lightermen on the Thames during the Blitz.

The pub also serves as the location for the final scenes in The Old Guard (2020).

== See also ==
- Town of Ramsgate
- List of restaurants in London
- Watermen's stairs
- The Grapes, Limehouse
