= St John's Church, Wapping =

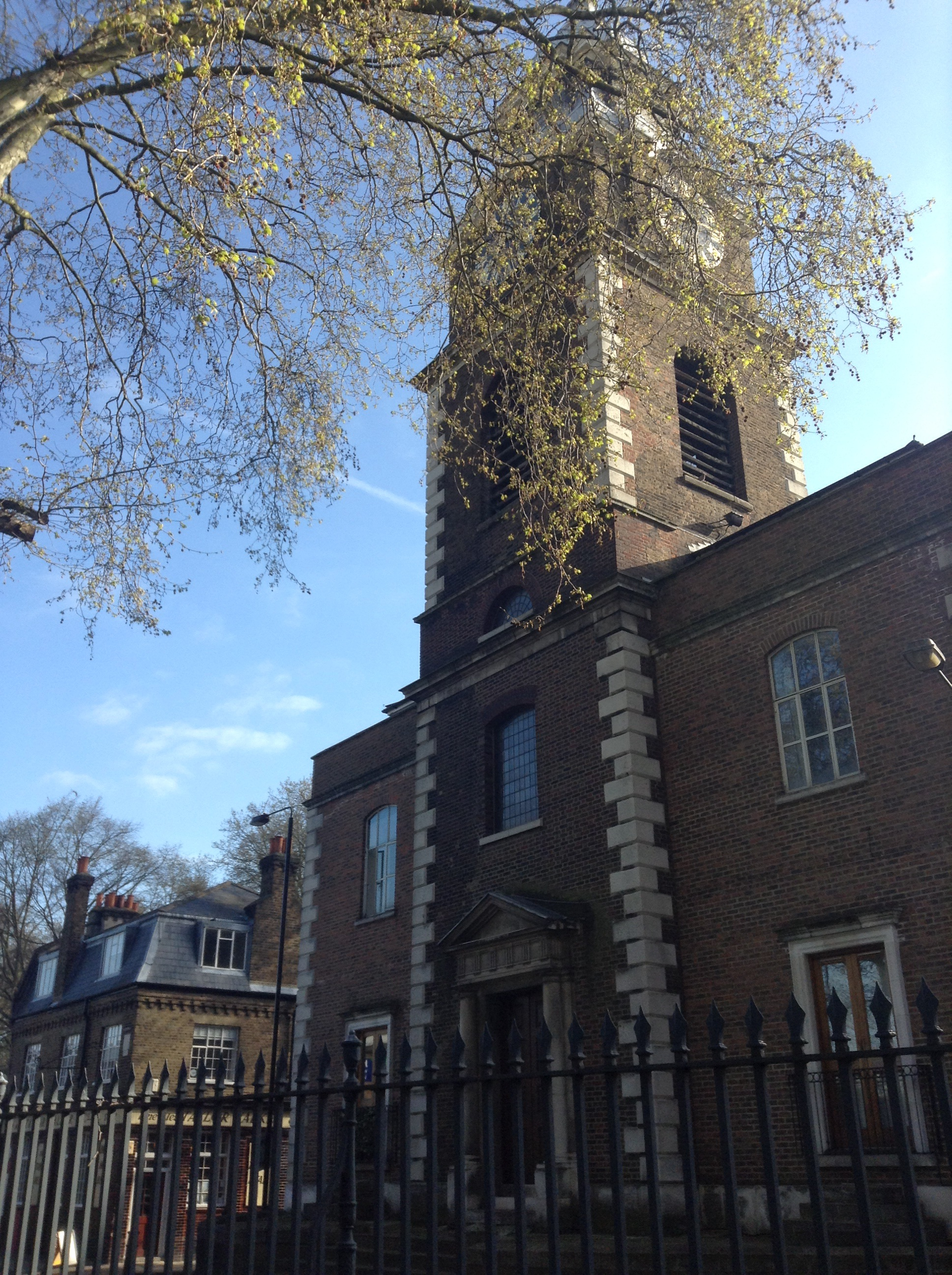
- Tower of St John's Church, Wapping
- St John's Church, Wapping
- 51°30′14.5″N 0°03′40.4″W
- Country: England
- Denomination: Church of England

Architecture
- Years built: 1756

St John's Church, Wapping, was the Church of England parish church in Wapping, formerly in Middlesex and now part of east London. Built in the 18th century, the church was bombed during World War II, although the tower remains an important local landmark. The church is a Grade II listed building.

== History ==
Parish of St. John of Wapping Act 1694
- Act of Parliament
- Parliament of England
- Long title: An Act for erecting a new Parish, to be called the Parish of St. John of Wapping, in the County of Middl'x.
- Citation: 5 & 6 Will. & Mar. c. 20 Pr.
- Territorial extent: England and Wales

Dates
- Royal assent: 16 April 1694
- Commencement: 7 November 1693 (Note: Start of session.)

Status: Current legislation

St John's Church was originally built as a chapel-of-ease to Whitechapel in 1615-17 and became the parish church when Wapping was constituted as a separate parish by the Parish of St. John of Wapping Act 1694 (5 & 6 Will. & Mar. c. 20 Pr.). This makes it the oldest church in Wapping. The present remains date to 1756, when the church was rebuilt by Joel Johnson, who had trained as a carpenter. The church was bombed in WWII, with only a fragmentary rectangular shell remaining. The tower was restored in 1964 by the London County Council and the remainder converted into flats in the 1990s.

Further traces of the 18th century neighbourhood remain nearby. Opposite, the former churchyard abuts the former dock wall. It was made into a public park in 1951, but still contains chest tombs to the Staple children, c. 1730, and to John Robinson, c. 1750. Adjoining the church is St John's Old School, founded c. 1695 for the new parish and rebuilt together with the church in 1756.

== Architecture ==
The tower has a continental-looking lead top and, above the clock stage, a concave receding stage and then a Baroque cupola. The new outer walls are brick with quoins.

== Current use ==
Starting in July 2023, there have been regular services in the chapel at the base of the bell tower.

== Popular culture ==
St John's Church features in Season 4, Episode 23 of Friends, "The One with Ross's Wedding". In that episode, Ross, Monica, and Emily approach a dilapidated church, where Ross and Emily are meant to be married, but are shocked to find that it is a building site, with the church in the process of being demolished. The exterior of St John's Church is visible in the scene, although it is unlikely that the subsequent wedding was filmed onsite.
