= Oliver's Wharf =

Converted warehouse in Wapping, London

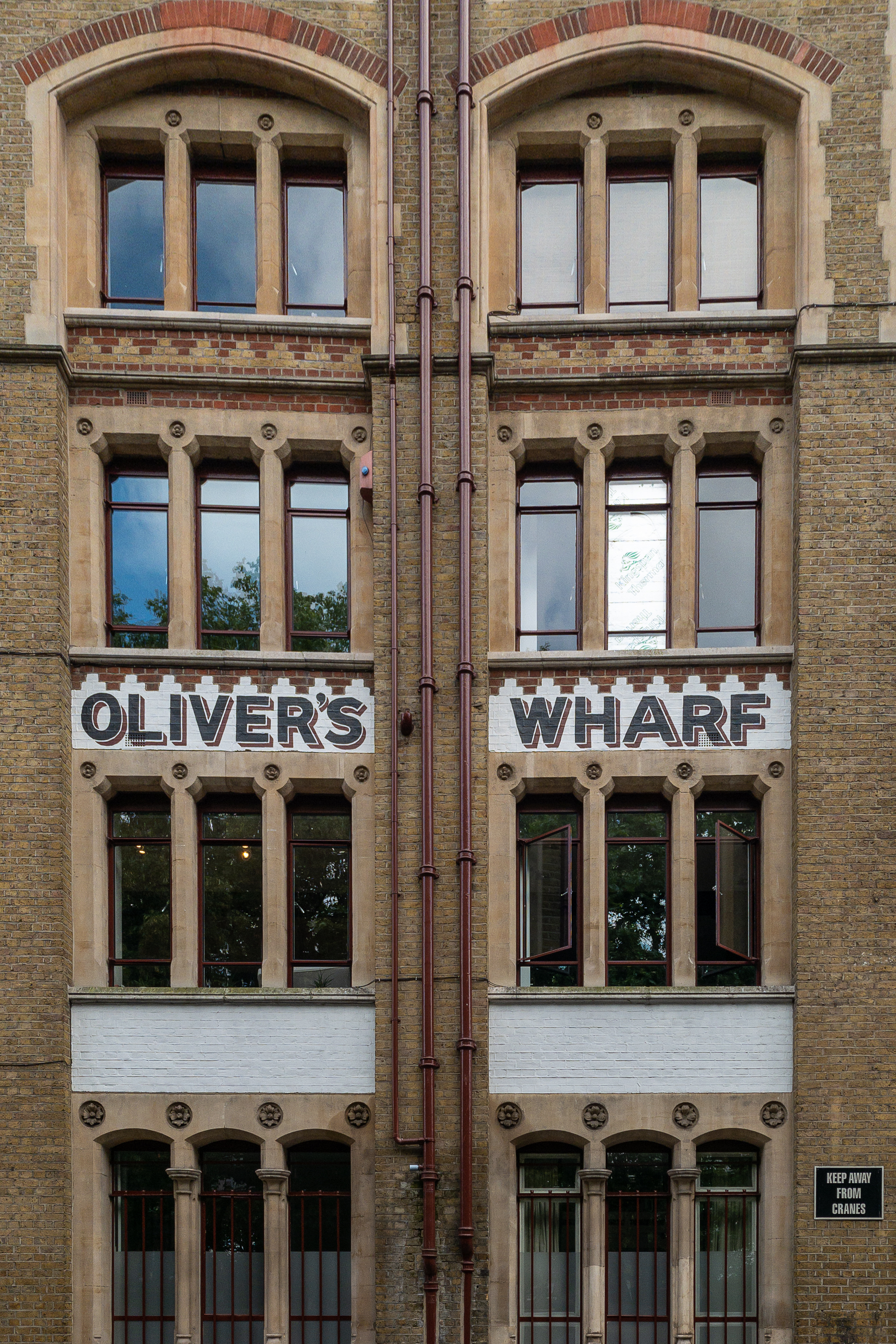
- View from Wapping High Street

- Location within London Borough of Tower Hamlets Oliver's Wharf (Greater London)

General information
- Architectural style: Gothic
- Location: Wapping, 64 Wapping High Street, E1W, London, United Kingdom
- Coordinates: 51°30′12″N 0°3′41″W
- Completed: 1870

Technical details
- Material: Polychrome brick

Design and construction
- Architects: Frederick and Horace Francis
- Designations

Listed Building – Grade II
- Official name: Oliver's Wharf
- Designated: 27 September 1973
- Reference no.: 1065806

Oliver's Wharf is a Grade II listed apartment building and former warehouse on the River Thames in Wapping High Street, Wapping, London.

== History ==
=== Construction ===
The warehouse was built in 1870 by architects Frederick and Horace Francis to store tea and other cargo. It had a capacity of 60,000 packages.

=== Conversion to housing ===
In 1972, Oliver's Wharf was converted into luxury apartments by Tony Goddard of Goddard Manton Partnership. It is the first of Wapping's, and one of the first Docklands warehouses altogether, to undergo such a conversion.
