= Watermen's stairs =

Stairs and alleys to the River Thames in England

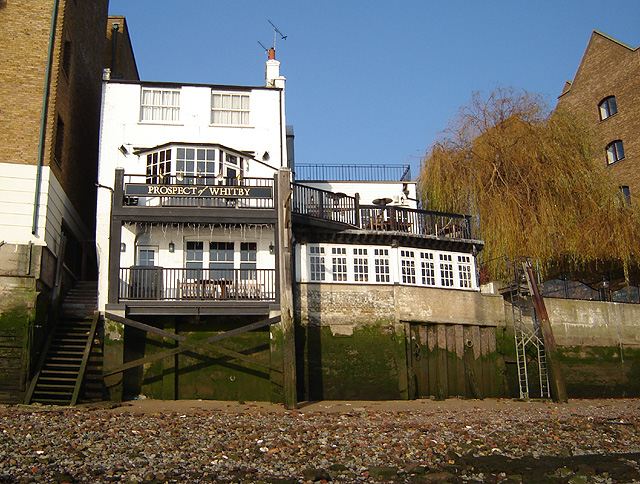
The Pelican Stairs next to the Prospect of Whitby pub in Wapping

Watermen's stairs were semipermanent structures that formed part of a complex transport network of public stairs, causeways and alleys in use from the 14th century to access the waters of the tidal River Thames in England. They were used by watermen, who taxied passengers across and along the river in London.

Stairs were used at high tide, and causeways were used at low tide, built down to the littoral water level from street level, their location being memorised during a waterman's apprenticeship. Stairs were recognised by custom and practice as safe plying places to pick up and put down passengers and were a valuable aid to rescue if anyone was unfortunate enough to fall into the river, as they were often built adjacent to a public house.

== History ==
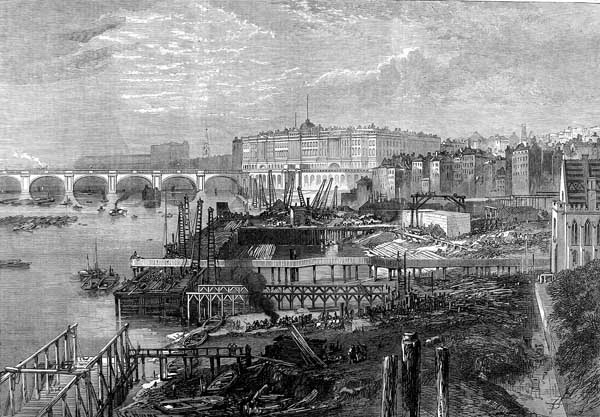
Thames Embankment, 1865

The embanking of the tidal Thames was a centuries-old process that lined the river with walls that were meant to stop high water overflowing onto adjacent lands. Alleyways leading down to the Thames became the only practical way to cross over the river via boat as Old London Bridge was frequently blocked. Wharves and later rudimentary docks began to be used to offload goods but most ships simply moored in lines in the middle of the river and their cargo was rowed to shore and carried up shoreline stairs. Some of the Thames original shoreline did remain free from the construction of houses or walls. The access to the river was via shore, gaps between houses used to launch boats. As late as the 1850s nearly all new bridges were built with stairs at both ends, and generally on both sides.

The Embankment which artificially engineered the Thames' natural course in the 1860s left buildings that had been located on the gently sloping incline to the river some distance from the water's edge.

The growth of steamboats in the 1850s allowed boats to dock at specially constructed steamboat piers. Grab chains were built into the now steeply embanked high walls of the central Pool of the river Thames as an aide to rescue but access to the busiest central areas was geared towards mass transit by the 1890s. Later with the increased use of the Hackney carriage, London's stairs gradually fell into disuse or were simply built over and the abrupt collapse of traffic in the up river docks on the central tidal Thames in the 1960s effectively ended their use as transit points within London's transport network.

== Cause célèbre ==
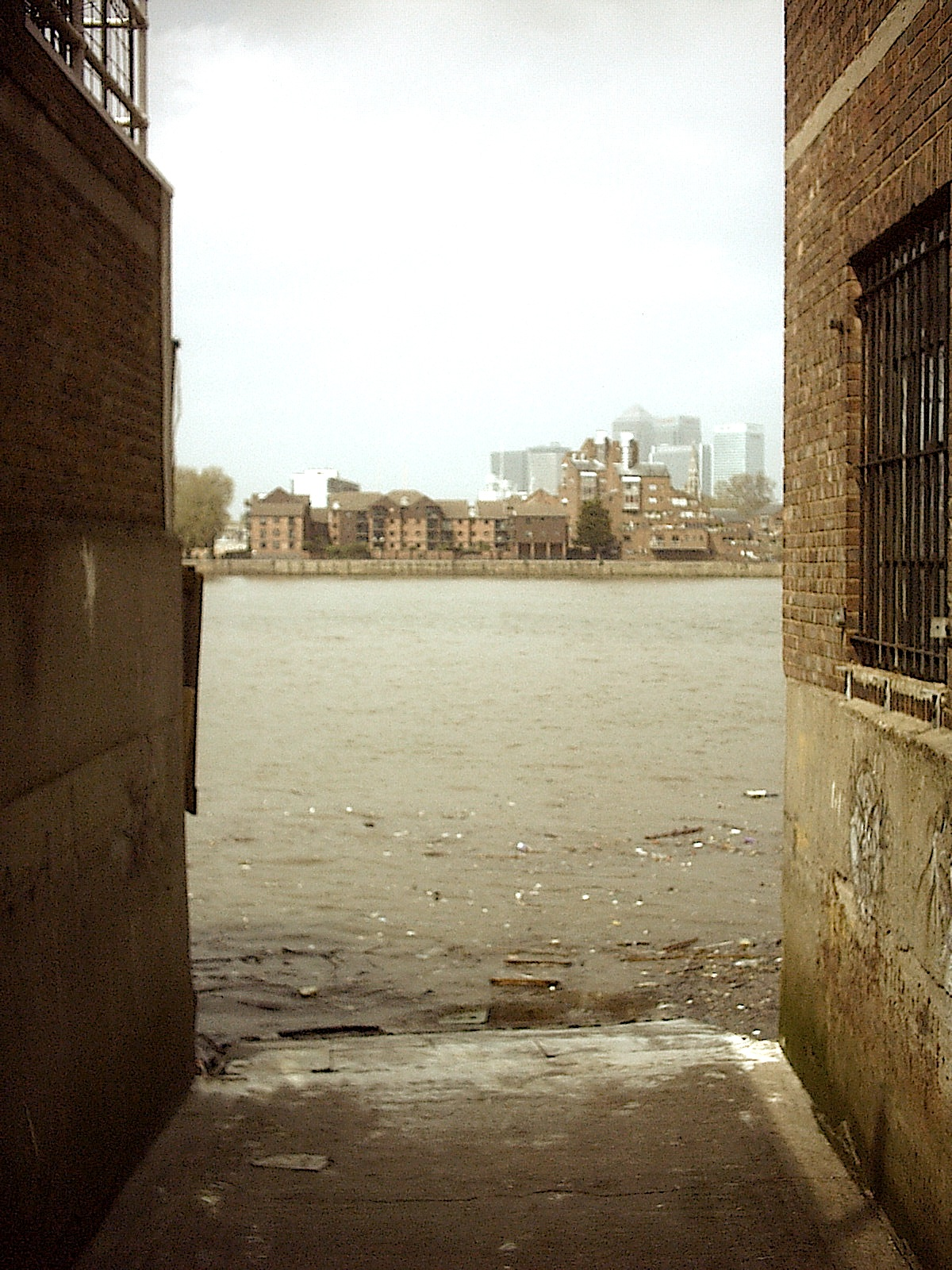
Thames access (High Bridge Drawdock, Greenwich)

During the 1990s the continued existence of these sites as rights of way had seemed untenable, despite their importance to London's transport history and as future sites for archaeological investigation. In the 1980s a local lobby group initially based around the Isle of Dogs began to campaign for more local involvement, in the urban renewal of London's East End. Many local people who "worked the river" began to raise awareness of the decaying state of and lack of river access to the Thames as many stairs and small Docks were bulldozed during massive redevelopment. It became something of a cause célèbre amongst local people and amateur rowers across London who now felt that the regeneration of London's port districts specifically favoured businesses and property development over the preservation and fair use of river access for local communities and the public.

Meanwhile, the newly formed – the Pool of London Partnership – established in 1996 to help promote urban renewal of the areas north and south of the river began to successfully lobby for the location of Greater London Authority (GLA) building to be in the Pool of London development area.

In 2002, The City of London recommended that river and foreshore access, the stairs and steps on the Thames, should be opened up where there is a "historical precedent and a practical need".

Barely eleven Stairs are still in existence, tucked away on the quieter stretches of the river, semi derelict as they have not been in regular use since the 1930s. Many of the pubs to which they provided access from water level were destroyed by bombing during World War II. For centuries these locations dotted along the entire length of the river Thames shoreline were the final points of embarkation at which countless individuals began a forced or chosen new life overseas. It remains to be seen if these strange emotive architectural curiosities, milestones in London's long maritime history, that are located outside the now restored old Pool of London's borders, will be preserved for future generations.

== Public stairs in use on the River Thames mid 1700s ==
In 1746 the surveyor and cartographer John Rocque published a map of London that listed the following stairs on the Thames. (Some docks and wharves are also included.)

Surrey Shore	River Thames	London Shore
Vaux Hall Gunhouse White Hart Lambeth Stangate	Upstream	Parliament Westminster Bridge
Westminster Bridge
Kings Arms Morris's Causeway Old Barge House Bull Marygold Paris Garden Faulcon Mason Goat New Thames Street Horseshoe Alley Bank End St. Mary Overies Cock Alley Pepper Alley		Manchester Privy Garden Whitehall Hungerford Black Lyon York Buildings Salisbury Savoy Somerset Strand Bridge Surrey Arundel Essex Temple White Fryers Dorset Blackfryers Puddle Dock Paul's Wharf Trig Queen Hith Little Queen Hith Three Crane Dowgate Steel Yard Alhallows Cole Harbour Old Swan
London Bridge
Tooly Battle Bridge Pickle Herring Still Horsleydown Old George Horsleydown New Savory Mill East Lane Three Mariners Fountain Cherry Garden West Lane Redriff Kings Princes Elephant Church Hannover Ruffels Mill King and Queen Globe Shepherd and Dog Greenland Dog and Duck George	Downstream	Billingsgate Bear Key Custom House Tower Iron Gate St. Catherine's Ald. Parsons's Hermitage Union Wapping Old Wapping New Execution Dock Wapping Dock King Edwards New Crane King James's Pelican Shadwell Dock Coal Bell Wharf Great Stone Trinity Stone Hall Queen Godwell Kidney Shipping Limehouse Hole
Surrey Shore	River Thames	London Shore

== Public stairs in use on the River Thames mid 1800s ==
A century later "Cross's New Plan Of London" published in 1850 showed the following stairs. (Some docks and piers are also included.)

Surrey Shore	River Thames	London Shore
		Beaufort
Battersea Bridge
	Upstream	Feather O. Magpie Ranelagh
Vauxhall Bridge		Vauxhall Bridge
Vauxhall Bridge
Vauxhall Gunners White Hart Horse Ferry Lambeth Stangate		Millbank [Penitentiary] Horse Ferry
Westminster Bridge		
Westminster Bridge
Westminster Bridge		Westminster Bridge
Kings Arms		Whitehall Hungerford York Buildings Salisbury
Waterloo Bridge		Waterloo Bridge
Waterloo Bridge
Waterloo Bridge		Waterloo Bridge
Old Bargehouse Bull		Surrey Arundel Essex Temple Watermans
Blackfriars Bridge		Blackfriars Bridge
Blackfriars Bridge
Blackfriars Bridge		Blackfriars Bridge
Paris Garden Falcon Masons Goat [Emerson Street]		Puddle Dock Castle [Queen Hithe]
Southwark Bridge
St. Mary Ov[erie]s St. Saviours Dock		Steel Yard Allhallows [Swan]
London Bridge
Tooley Battle Bridge Pickle Herring Still Horslydown Old George Horslydown New Mill East Lane 3 Mariners Fountain Cherry Garden West Lane Rotherhithe King Princes Elephant Church Hanover Russels Mill Kings Mill Bull Head Dock King and Queen Globe Lavender Dock Pier The Pageants Commercial Dock Pier Greenland Dog and Duck George Kings Billingsgate Garden Pier Greenwich Pier Hospital [Pelton Road] Pier	Downstream	Billingsgate Custom House Tower Iron Gate St. Catharine Alderman Parsons Hermitage Browns Quay Union Wapping Old Gun Dock Wapping New Execution Dock Wapping Dock Frying Pan New Crane King James's Shadwell Dock Cole Stone Ratcliff Cross Kidney Duke Limehouse Hole Mill Wall Chalkstone Willow Bridge Blackwall
Surrey Shore	River Thames	London Shore

== See also ==
- Thames Path
- Lower Marsh Market

== Sources ==
- Rocque's map of London online http://freepages.genealogy.rootsweb.com/~genmaps/genfiles/COU_files/ENG/LON/Rocque/rocque_index.htm
- Pool of London http://www.pooloflondon.co.uk/news.builder/00546.html
- Historical precedent and a practical need http://cms.cityoflondon.gov.uk/NR/rdonlyres/B793C4BC-BC84-4292-BD17-8B4039003E29/0/DP_PL_riversideappraisal.pdf
- English Heritage http://www.english-heritage.org.uk/upload/pdf/thamesgateway.pdf
- Grab Chains https://publications.parliament.uk/pa/cm199495/cmhansrd/1995-04-19/Writtens-2.html
- Ted Johns https://www.theguardian.com/news/2004/may/12/guardianobituaries.politics
- First Settlers Monument http://www.tower-bridge.org.uk/fact1.htm
- First Settlers Monument http://www.tower-bridge.org.uk/monplan3.jpg
