= Harun =

- Pronunciation: Arabic: [hɑːˈruːn, hɑːˈroːn]
- Gender: Male
- Language: Arabic

Origin
- Origin: Ancient Egyptian
- Meaning: Leader, Strength, warrior Lion
- Region of origin: Arabian Peninsula

Other names
- Alternative spelling: Haroon, Haroun and Hamroun
- Related names: Aaron, Haron

Harun (Arabic: هارون, Hārūn), also transliterated as Haroon, Hamroun, or Haroun, is a masculine given name and surname of Arabic origin, related to the Hebrew name of the Prophet Aaron. Both are most likely of Egyptian origin, from ꜥḥꜣ rw, meaning "warrior lion". Notable people with the name include:

== Given name ==
=== Haroon ===
- Haroon (singer) (born 1973), Pakistani pop singer
- Haroon al-Afghani (born 1981), Afghan Guantanamo detainee
- Haroon Ahmed (1936–2024), British-Pakistani scientist
- Haroon Arshad (born 1999), American-born Hong Kong cricketer
- Haroon Arshad (Pakistani cricketer) (born 2005), Pakistani cricketer
- Haroon Aslam, Pakistani Army general
- Haroon Rashid Aswat (born 1974), British terrorist
- Haroon Bacha (born 1972), Pakistani singer and composer
- Haroon Khan Badshah (1909–1983), Pakistani politician
- Haroon Bhorat, South African economist
- Haroon Bilour (1971–2018), Pakistani politician
- Haroon Imran Gill, Pakistani politician
- Haroon Habib (born 1948), Bangladeshi writer, journalist, and columnist
- Haroon Islam (1967–2007), Pakistani military officer
- Haroon Ismail (born 1955), Zimbabwean tennis player
- Haroon Khan (boxer) (born 1991), British boxer
- Haroon Khan (Maharashtra politician) (born 1962), Indian politician
- Haroon Khan (senator), Pakistani politician
- Haroon Akhtar Khan (born 1963), Pakistani politician
- Haroon Lorgat (born 1960), South African businessman
- Haroon Mirza (born 1977), British-Pakistani contemporary visual artist
- Haroon Moghul (born 1980), Pakistani-American author and commentator
- Haroon Rahim (born 1949), Pakistani former tennis player
- Haroon Rasheed (born 1953), Pakistani cricketer
- Haroon Rasheed (Punjab cricketer) (1962–2021), Pakistani cricketer
- Haroon Rashid (chemist), Pakistani-American chemist
- Haroon Al Rashid (1938/39–2026), Bangladeshi politician
- Haroon Shahid (born 1989), Pakistani musician and actor
- Haroon Sharif (born 1965), Pakistani economist
- Haroon Khan Sherwani (1891–1980), Indian historian, scholar, and author
- Haroon Shukat (born 1988), Pakistani weightlifter
- Haroon Siddiqui, Indian-Canadian newspaper journalist, columnist, and editor
- Haroon Ullah (born 1977), American author, educator, scholar, diplomat, publicist, and researcher
- Haroon Yousaf (born 1973), Pakistani footballer
- Haroon Yousofi, Afghan journalist, poet, and satirist
- Haroon Yusuf (born 1958), Indian politician

=== Haroun ===
- Haroun (comedian) (born 1984), French comedian and actor
- Haroun Bouazzi (born 1979), Tunisian-Canadian politician
- Haroun Gaye (born 1968/69), Central African warlord
- Haroun Kabadi (born 1949), Chadian politician
- Haroun Korjie (born 1972), Sierra Leonean sprinter
- Haroun Mohamed (born 1998), French-Djiboutian footballer
- Haroun Ag Said (died 2014), Malian Tuareg rebel and commander
- Haroun Suleiman (born 1953), Tanzanian politician
- Haroun Tazieff (1914–1988) Franco-Belgian volcanologist and geologist
- Haroun Tchaouna (born 2000), Chadian footballer
- Haroun Touny (born 1947), Egyptian water polo player
- Haroun Yashayaei (born 1935), Iranian Jewish community leader

=== Harun ===
- Harun (Ghaznavid governor of Khwarazm) (died 1035), governor of Khwarazm
- Harun of Barcelona, Wali of Barcelona
- Harun Aliu (1971–2010), Albanian army commander
- Harun Alpsoy (born 1997), Swiss-Turkish footballer
- Harun Ateş (born 1968), Turkish taekwondo practitioner
- Harun Babunagari (1902–1986), Bangladeshi Islamic scholar
- Harun Salim Bachik (1959–2015), Malaysian actor and comedian
- Harun Beka (1951–1999), Albanian nationalist, activist, and soldier
- Harun el-Raschid Bey (1886–1963), German SS officer
- Harun Çabuk (born 1997), Turkish motorcycle racer
- Harun Ahmed Chowdhury (born 1945), Bangladeshi Army officer
- Harun Doğan (born 1976), Turkish sport wrestler
- Harun Durabi (born 1963), Malaysian politician and teacher
- Harun Erbek (born 1986), Turkish-Austrian footballer
- Harun Erdenay (born 1968), Turkish basketball player
- Harun Farocki (1944–2014), German filmmaker
- Harun Hamid (born 2003), English-Pakistani footballer
- Harun Hasani (born 1940), Serbian dentist, cultural figure, and politician
- Harun ibn Muhammad ibn Ishaq al-Hashimi (died 901), Abbasid personage and government official
- Harun Hassan (born 1978), Kenyan disability rights activists
- Harun Idris (1925–2003), Malaysian politician
- Harun Iman (born 1981), Somali-American middle-distance runner
- Harun Isa (born 1969), Macedonian footballer
- Harun Islamabadi (1938–2003), Bangladeshi Islamic scholar
- Harun Jusoh (1948–2023), Malaysian footballer
- Harun Kamil, Indonesian politician
- Harun Karadeniz (1942–1975), Turkish activist
- Harun Khan, British-Bangladeshi Muslim community leader
- Harun Aur Rashid Khan, Bangladeshi politician
- Harun Rashid Khan (born 1955), Indian banker
- Harun ibn Khumarawayh (died 904), Tulunid Emir of Egypt
- Harun Maruf, Somali journalist
- Harun Mehmedinović, Bosnian-American director
- Harun Rashid Mollah (died 1992), Bangladeshi politician
- Harun ibn Musa (died 786), Jewish Arabic language and Islamic scholar
- Harun Mut (born 2000), Turkish para-alpine skier and amputee football player
- Harun Nasution (1919–1998), Indonesian Islamic scholar and philosopher
- Harun al-Rashid (died 809), Abbasid caliph
- Harun-ar-Rashid, Bangladeshi politician
- Harun Ar-Rashid (sultan of Sulu) (1769–??), sultan of Sulu
- Harun Hashim Rashid (1927–2020), Palestinian poet and librarian
- Harun-or-Rashid (academic) (born 1954), Bangladeshi academic
- Harun ur Rashid, Bangladeshi police officer
- Harun Ripin (born 1946), Singaporean criminal
- Harun Robert (born 1978), Indian YouTube and TV personality
- Harun Tekin (footballer) (born 1989), Turkish footballer
- Harun Tekin (musician) (born 1977), Turkish singer
- Harun Thohir (1943–1968), Indonesian soldier and terrorist
- Harun Ülman (1900–1977), Turkish sailor
- Harun Al Rasyid Zain (1927–2014), Indonesian academic, economist, and bureaucrat

== Surname ==
=== Hamroun ===
- Jugurtha Hamroun (born 1989), Algerian footballer

=== Haroon ===
- Hussain Haroon (born 1950), Pakistani politician
- Tariq Haroon (born 1977), Pakistani cricketer
- Yusuf Haroon (1916–2011), Pakistani politician

=== Haroun ===
- Ahmed Haroun (born 1964), Sudanese politician and war criminal
- Ali Haroun (born 1927), Algerian lawyer and politician
- Faris Haroun (born 1985), Belgian footballer
- Nadjim Haroun (born 1988), Belgian footballer

=== Harun ===
- Aminuddin Harun (born 1967), Malaysian politician
- Andi Harun (born 1972), Indonesian politician
- Art Harun (born 1962), Malaysian politician
- Dilara Harun (1946–2012), Bangladeshi politician
- Idrus Harun (born 1955), Malaysian lawyer
- Rina Harun (born 1973), Malaysian politician

== See also ==
- Harun, İskilip, village in Turkey
- Haron, given name and surname
- Haroun and the Sea of Stories, children's novel by Salman Rushdie
- Haroonabad (disambiguation), cities and towns in Pakistan
- Islamic view of Aaron
