= Haroonur Rashid =

Haroon Rashid or Haroonur Rashid may refer to:

== People ==
- Harun al-Rashid (763/766–809), fifth Arab Abbasid Caliph from 786 to 809
- Harun Ar-Rashid (sultan of Sulu) (1769–1899), sultan who reigned from 1886 to 1894 in Sulu
- M Harunur Rashid (archaeologist) (1925–2010), Bangladeshi archaeologist
- Harunur Rashid Khan Monno (1932–2017), Bangladeshi industrialist and politician
- A. M. Harun-ar-Rashid (1933–2021), Bangladeshi physicist
- Harunur Rashid (filmmaker) (1936/1937–2024), Bangladeshi film director and writer
- M. Harunur Rashid (born 1939), Bangladeshi writer
- M. Harun-Ar-Rashid (1948–2025), Bangladeshi Army officer
- Haroon Rasheed (born 1953), Pakistani cricketer
- Harun-or-Rashid (academic) (born 1954), Bangladeshi university administrator and academic
- Harun Rashid Khan (born 1955), Indian banker
- Harunur Rashid (Chandpur politician) (born 1957), Bangladeshi politician from Chandpur-4
- Haroon Rasheed (Punjab cricketer) (1962–2021), Pakistani cricketer
- SM Haroon-or-Rashid (born 1962), Bangladeshi dramatist and journalist
- Harunur Rashid (Chapai Nawabganj politician) (born 1962), Bangladeshi politician from Chapai Nawabganj District
- Harunur Rashid (cricketer) (born 1968), Bangladeshi cricketer
- Haroon (singer) (born 1973; fullname Aaron Haroon Rashid), Pakistani pop musician
- Haroon Rashid Aswat (born 1979), British Islamist
- Harunur Rashid Khan, Bangladeshi politician from Chandpur-3
- Harun-ar-Rashid, Bangladeshi politician from Comilla District
- Harun Aur Rashid Khan, Bangladeshi politician from Chittagong District
- Mohammad Harun ar Rashid, Bangladeshi politician from Dhaka District
- Harunur Rashid (Lakshmipur politician), Bangladeshi politician from Lakshmipur District
- Haroon Rashid (chemist), Pakistani academic and administrator
- Harun ur Rashid, Bangladeshi police officer and a former chief of Dhaka Metropolitan Police
- Mohammad Harun Al Rashid, Bangladeshi diplomat and former ambassador of Bangladesh to Morocco
- Md. Harun Ur Rashid, Bangladeshi police officer

== Other uses ==
- Harun al Raschid (film), a 1924 Austrian film directed by Michael Curtiz
- Al-Rashid Billah the 12th-century Caliph of Baghdad from 1135 to August 1136.

== See also ==
- The Gift of Harun Al-Raschid, a 1924 poem by William Butler Yeats
- Haruna (disambiguation)
