= Mutt =

Mutt or Mutts may refer to:

== People ==
- Mutt, a derogatory term for mixed-race people

=== Nickname ===
- Larry Black (sprinter) (1951–2006), American sprinter
- Mutt Carey (1886–1948), New Orleans jazz trumpeter
- Emanuel J. "Mutt" Evans (1907–1997), American businessman and first Jewish mayor of Durham, North Carolina
- Robert John "Mutt" Lange (born 1948), music producer
- Andrew Shaw (ice hockey) (born 1991), Canadian National Hockey League player
- Mutt Summers (1904–1954), chief test pilot at Vickers-Armstrongs and Supermarine
- Mutt Williams (baseball) (1892–1962), Major League Baseball pitcher
- Mutt Wilson (1896–1962), Major League Baseball pitcher

=== Other ===
- "R. Mutt" (Richard Mutt), pseudonym used once by the French artist Marcel Duchamp to sign his shocking artwork Fountain in 1917
- codename of Allied double agent John "Helge" Moe during World War II - see Mutt and Jeff (spies)
- Mihkel Mutt (born 1953), Estonian writer and journalist

=== Fictional characters ===
- A. Mutt, a character in the Mutt and Jeff comic
- Mutt (G.I. Joe), a fictional character in the G.I. Joe universe
- Mutt Williams, Indiana Jones' son in Indiana Jones and the Kingdom of the Crystal Skull, played by Shia LaBeouf
- Mutt, a Muttaburrasaurus in The Land Before Time
- Mutts, genetically-engineered mutant species in the fictional world of The Hunger Games

== Music ==
- Mutt (album), a 2024 album by American musician Leon Thomas
  - "Mutt" (Leon Thomas song), the title track
- Mutt (Blink-182 song), a 1999 song from Enema of the State album
- Mutts (band), a rock band from Chicago
- Mutt, a 2004 album by roots-music group Lost Dogs

== Other uses ==
- Mongrel, or mutt, a dog of unknown ancestry
- M151, a nickname based on Military Utility Tactical Truck
- MutT, alternate name for 8-oxo-dGTP diphosphatase, an enzyme
- Mutt, Virginia, an unincorporated community
- Mutt (email client), a terminal-based e-mail client for Unix-like systems
- Mutt (hinduism), alternate spelling for Matha, a Hindu or Jain religious establishment
- Mutt (film), a 2023 film by Vuk Lungulov-Klotz
- Mutts (comic strip), a comic strip by Patrick McDonnell

== See also ==
- Matt (disambiguation)
- Mut (disambiguation)
