= Dog Cry Ranch =

Coordinates: 42.37482°N 120.97856°W

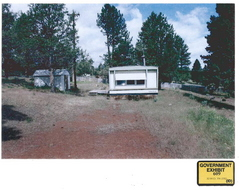
Photo of the Dog Cry Ranch

The Dog Cry Ranch was a sheep ranch near Bly, Oregon, that American security officials assert was to be the location of a jihad training camp.

James Ujaama, an American convert to Islam, has admitted he met Abu Hamza al-Masri in 1999, and convinced him that together they could set up a military training camp where American recruits would be trained for jihad. Abu Hamza was to provide funds and experienced trainers. Uyaama was to provide a safe location for the camp, weapons and the American recruits.

KOMO News reported, "According to court records, the whole setup was a hustle by petty crook James Ujaama of Seattle."

Swedish citizen Oussama Kassir and British citizen Haroon Rashid Aswat, two men who said they had attended training camps in Afghanistan, were to be the camp's trainers. When the two men arrived to set up the camp in December 1999, they found there were just two recruits, Sami Osman and his teenage brother-in-law. They found Ujaama had supplied just two old guns and inadequate housing. Ujaama abandoned the camp and the men, the night of the complaint-filled day they arrived. At Kassir's trial, he and Aswat were described as trying to provide training to Osman and his brother-in-law, until they got a phone call from al Masri. Because they feared al Masri's phone call had been monitored, and had tipped off the American officials, they too fled the camp.

In fact, American security officials had been monitoring the developing plans since the first contact between al Masri and Ujaam.

According to American law enforcement officials who tried to extradite al Masri, he could have faced a sentence of 100 years. In return for pleading guilty to providing material support for terrorism, and agreeing to cooperate in helping to convict the British men, Ujaama received a two-year sentence.

The owner of the ranch and his wife were believed to have been unaware of any criminal or terrorist connection, and were not charged.
