= Rami George Khouri =

Jordanian journalist

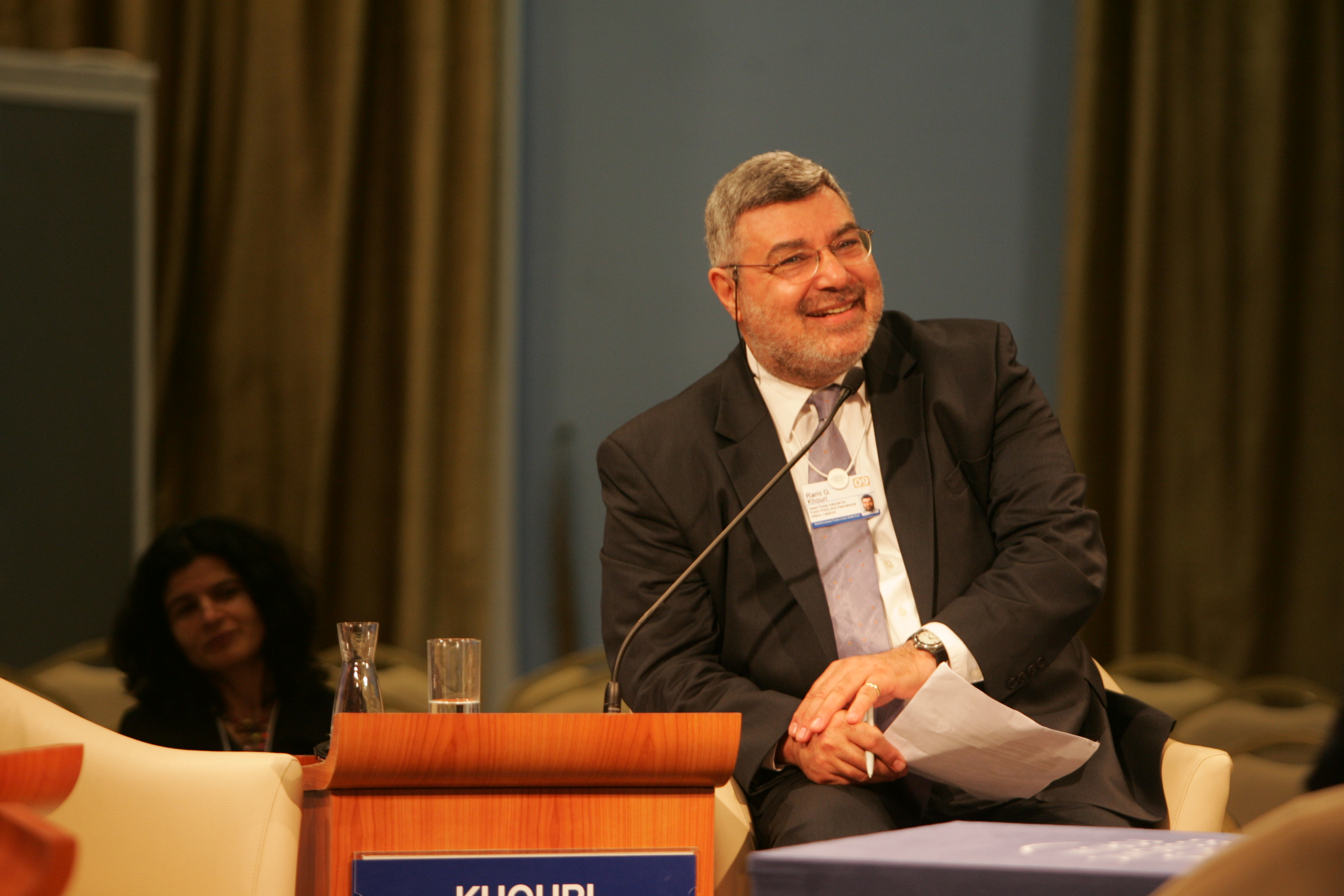
- Khouri in 2009
- Born: October 28, 1948 (age 77); New York City, New York, U.S.
- Education: International School of Geneva (BA); Syracuse University (MSc)
- Occupations: Journalist, editor, author
- Spouse: Ellen Kettaneh
- Children: 2
- Awards: Pax Christi International Peace Award

Rami George Khouri (born October 22, 1948) is a Jordanian-American journalist and editor with Palestinian background. He was born in New York City to an Arab Palestinian Christian family. His father, George Khouri, a Nazarene journalist from former Mandatory Palestine, had traveled with his wife to New York in 1947 as part of the UN partition debate. His family resides in Beirut, Amman, and Nazareth. He is also a public speaker. After attending secondary school at the International School of Geneva in Switzerland, Rami Khouri returned to the US to complete his education. Khouri has served for many years as the chief umpire for Little League Baseball in Jordan.

== Career ==
In 1971, Khouri began his career working as a reporter for the English-language newspaper The Daily Star in Beirut, Lebanon. From 1972 to 1973, Khouri continued writing columns for the paper while working as managing editor of Middle East Sketch magazine. Following a year in the United States as program administrator for the Division of International Programs Abroad at Syracuse University, Khouri returned to Beirut to become managing editor of Middle East Money in Beirut from 1973 to 1974. He then moved to Amman, Jordan, where he served as editor-in-chief of Jordan's English-language daily, the Jordan Times, from 1975 to 1982 and again from 1987.

Khouri is former director of the Issam Fares Institute for Public Policy and International Affairs (IFI) at the American University of Beirut. His journalistic work includes writing books and an internationally syndicated column by progressive commentary agency Agence Global, founded by Jahan Salehi. Khouri also serves as editor at large of the Beirut-based Daily Star newspaper, published throughout the Middle East with the International Herald Tribune. He had hosted "Encounter", a weekly current affairs talk show on Jordan Television, and "Jordan Ancient Cultures", a weekly archaeology program on Radio Jordan.

Khouri was a Nieman Journalism Fellow at Harvard University (2001–2002), nonresident senior fellow of the Dubai Initiative at the Belfer Center for Science and International Affairs, John F Kennedy School of Government, Harvard University and was appointed a member of the Brookings Institution Task Force on U.S. Relations with the Islamic World. Khouri is a research associate at the Program on the Analysis and Resolution of Conflict at the Maxwell School, Syracuse University (NY, USA), a Fellow of the Palestinian Academic Society for the Study of International Affairs, Jerusalem (PASSIA), and a member of the Leadership Council of the Harvard University Divinity School. Khouri also serves on the board of the EastWest Institute, the Center for Contemporary Arab studies at Georgetown University and the National Museum of Jordan.

He was executive editor of the Daily Star newspaper from 2003 to 2005, and had been the editor in chief of the Jordan Times for seven years before that. He also wrote for many years from Amman, Jordan for international publications, including the Financial Times, the Boston Globe and the Washington Post. For 18 years he was general manager of Al Kutba, publishers, in Amman, and has served as a consultant to the Jordanian tourism ministry on Biblical archaeological sites. He comments on Mideast issues in the international media, and lectures at conferences and universities throughout the world. In the fall of 2017 Khouri was a visiting professor at Villanova University.

== Views on the Arab-Israeli conflict ==
Khouri wrote that he believes that "allocating blame" is counterproductive. Writing for a Lebanese newspaper, the Daily Star, he stated that "We end up with a situation in which it becomes easy for Arabs to blame Israel and the Western powers for the problems of our region." He believes that "the truth is in between, with Arab, Israel and Western actors all having to share the blame for contributing to the distressing conditions that define the Arab world."

== Awards and personal life ==
Khouri was the 2004 winner of the Eliav-Sartawi Awards for Middle East Journalism in the Arab Press category In November 2006, he was the co-recipient of the Pax Christi International Peace Award for his efforts to bring peace and reconciliation to the Middle East.

He has BA (1970) and MSc (1998) degrees respectively in political science and mass communications from Syracuse University, New York, and is married to Ellen Kettaneh. They have two grown sons.

== See also ==
- Palestinian Christians

== Published works ==
- The Antiquities of the Jordan Rift Valley Published by Al Kutba, 1988 ISBN 0-944940-49-8, ISBN 978-0-944940-49-5
- Petra: A Guide to the Capital of the Nabataeans Published by Longman, 1986 ISBN 0-582-78385-2, ISBN 978-0-582-78385-0
- Jerash: A Frontier City of the Roman East Published by Longman, 1986 ISBN 0-582-78384-4, ISBN 978-0-582-78384-3
- The Jordan Valley: Life and Society Below Sea Level Published by Longman, 1981 ISBN 0-582-78318-6, ISBN 978-0-582-78318-8
- USAID and the Private Sector in Jordan: A Chronicle : the Genesis, August 1985-August 1988 Published by USAID, 1989
- The View from East of the Jordan Published by Center for Policy Analysis on Palestine, 1998
- Aqaba: port of Palestine on the China Sea Co-author Rami G. Khouri and Donald S. Whitcomb Published by Al Kutba, 1988
- Islamic Banking: Knotting a New Network Published by Aramco, 1987
- For Those who Share a Will to Live: Perspectives on a Just Peace in the Middle East Published by Resource Center for Nonviolence, 1985
