= Oussama Kassir =

Militant Islamist

Oussama Abdallah Kassir
- Born: 12 January 1966 (age 60); Beirut, Lebanon
- Arrested: 11 December 2005; Prague, Czech Republic; Czech officials
- Citizenship: Sweden

Oussama Abdallah Kassir (Arabic: أسامة عبدالله قصير; born 12 January 1966) is a Lebanese-born militant Islamist. He is a citizen of Sweden who served a prison sentence in Sweden on a number of violence and drug related offenses, and was later convicted by an American court for conspiring to support terrorism.

== Early life ==
Kassir was born in Beirut, Lebanon. He moved to Sweden in 1984 and was granted Swedish citizenship in 1989. He participated in the Lebanese Civil War during the 1980s and was hurt in battle. His last address in Sweden is an apartment in Bandhagen in southern Stockholm.

In September 2002 Kassir told The Seattle Times that, though not technically a member of Al-Qaeda, he was a "supporter" of Osama bin Laden: "I love Al-Qaeda ... I love Osama bin Laden."

== Swedish criminal conviction ==
In Sweden he was convicted of possession of illegal firearms, assault and battery of a policeman, and a drug related offense. He spent ten months in prison for possession of illegal firearms. While serving his sentence at the Österåker Prison he became a friend of Kérim Chatty, who was suspected of attempted hijacking of a Ryanair flight in Västerås but cleared of all terrorism-related charges.

== United States criminal trial ==
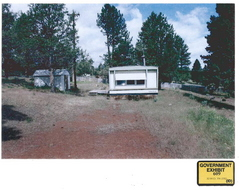
Oussama Kassir was disappointed by how primitive the facilities were at the Dog Cry Ranch.

Kassir was arrested in Prague, Czech Republic, while on his way to Beirut, on 11 December 2005, on a warrant filed by United States federal prosecutors. He was charged with conspiring to support terrorism by traveling from London to Bly, Oregon, in 1999 to help set up a jihad training camp. Kassir and another man, Haroon Rashid Aswat, were sent to the camp by Abu Hamza al-Masri, a radical London-based cleric. Kassir and Aswat lived for several weeks at a Central District mosque before traveling to Oregon where they met up with the camp founder James Ujaama and several other persons. The complaint states that Kassir spent nearly two months in Bly, where he, according to unidentified witnesses, trained others to use firearms, set up perimeter patrols on the property and was "in possession of at least one compact disc about improving poisons." The complaint further alleges that Kassir had trained for jihad in Afghanistan, Kashmir and Lebanon. On 25 September 2007 Kassir was extradited from Prague to the United States to face trial.

On 12 May 2009 Kassir was found guilty by a federal jury on all eleven charges brought against him. The jury deliberated for five and a half hours. The verdict was commented by terrorism expert Magnus Ranstorp as showing differences in evidential requirements from EU courts and was also criticized by civil rights activists.
