= Mushabbar =

Mushabbar may refer to:

- Mushabbar, third son of Harun (Aaron in the Bible)
- Al Muhsin, third son of Ali and Fatima, also known as Mushabbar
