= Harouna =

- Gender: male
- Languages: Hausa, Arabic

Origin
- Region of origin: Africa

Other names
- Variant form: Haruna
- Derived: Harun

Harouna, also spelled Haruna, is an African Muslim surname and masculine given name. It is derived from the accusative case inflected form of the Arabic name Harun. Notable people with the name include:

== Given name ==
Harouna

- Harouna Coulibaly (1962–2025), Nigerien writer and film director
- Harouna Lago (born 1946), Nigerien boxer
- Harouna Pale (born 1957), Burkinabé sprinter
- Harouna Doula Gabde (born 1966), Nigerien football manager
- Harouna Diarra (born 1978), Malian footballer
- Harouna Djibirin (born 2006), Cameroonian footballer
- Harouna Bamogo (born 1983), Burkinabé footballer
- Harouna Garba (born 1986), Nigerien hurdler
- Harouna Ilboudo (born 1986), Burkinabé cyclist
- Harouna Abou Demba (born 1991), French and Mauritanian footballer

Haruna

- Haruna Ishola (1919–1983), Nigerian musician
- Haruna Ilerika (1949–2008), Nigerian football player
- Haruna Abubakar (1952–2005), Nigerian politician for the People's Democratic Party
- Haruna Yakubu (born 1955), Ghanaian physicist and academic administrator
- Haruna Iddrisu (born 1970), Ghanaian politician, Member of Parliament for Tamale South, Minister of Trade and Industry
- Haruna Doda (born 1975), Nigerian football player in Malta
- Haruna Babangida (born 1982), Nigerian football player
- Haruna Moshi (born 1987), Tanzanian football player
- Haruna Niyonzima (born 1990), Rwandan football player
- Haruna Chanongo (born 1991), Tanzanian football player
- Haruna Jammeh (born 1991), Gambian footballer in Hungary
- Haruna Garba (born 1994), Nigerian football player in Sweden
- Haruna Kasolo Kyeyune, Ugandan politician, Member of Parliament for Kyotera County, Rakai District
- Haruna Mawa, Ugandan football coach
- Haruna Aziz Zeego, Nigerian politician, Senator for Kaduna South

== Surname ==
Harouna

- Mohamed Harouna (born 1950), Mauritanian footballer and manager
- Adamou Harouna, Nigerien soldier who led the 2010 coup

Haruna

- IBM Haruna (born 1940s), Nigerian general, Federal Commissioner for Information and Culture
- Boni Haruna (born 1957), Nigerian politician, Minister for Youth Development
- Lawal Haruna (born 1957), Nigerian general, military governor of Borno State in 1998 and 1999
- Lukman Haruna (born 1990), Nigerian football player
