= Haruna =

Haruna may refer to:

== Geography ==
- Haruna, Gunma, a town in Gunma prefecture, Japan
- Mount Haruna, a dormant volcano in Gunma, eastern Honshu, Japan
  - Lake Haruna, a lake on Mount Haruna

== Names ==
- Haruna (name), a Japanese feminine given name and a Japanese surname
- Haruna, Haroona or Harouna, a Quranic given name common mostly in Africa (for boys) and South Asia (for girls)

== Other uses ==
- Japanese battleship Haruna, a battleship of the Imperial Japanese Navy
- Haruna-class destroyer, a class of destroyers of the Japan Maritime Self-Defense Force
  - JDS Haruna (DDH-141)

== See also ==
- Harun, Arabic masculine given name
