= Mut (disambiguation) =

Mut is an ancient Egyptian mother goddess.

Mut may also refer to:

- Harun Mut (born 2000), Turkish para-alpine skier and amputee football player
- Mut (political party), in Germany
- Precinct of Mut, Egyptian temple
- Mut, Mersin, a district of Mersin Province, Turkey
  - Mut Castle, a castle in the area
  - Mut Wind Farm, a wind power plant in the area
- Mut, a main settlement in the Dakhla Oasis, Egypt

MUT may also refer to:

- Mangosuthu University of Technology, in Durban, South Africa
- Methylmalonyl-CoA mutase, a mitochondrial enzyme
- MUT (zinc finger protein), a synthetic zinc finger protein
- Mauritius Time, a time zone used in Mauritius
- MultiUser Talk, an obsolete BBS chat program
- Military University of Technology in Warsaw
- Manar University of Tripoli, in Lebanon

== See also ==
- MTU (disambiguation)
- Mutt (disambiguation)
- Mixed-breed dog (properly spelled as mutt)
