= Howard Bragman =

American crisis manager (1956–2023)

- Born: Howard Benjamin Bragman; February 24, 1956; Flint, Michigan, U.S.
- Died: February 11, 2023 (aged 66); Los Angeles, California, U.S.
- Education: University of Michigan
- Occupations: Crisis manager, publicist
- Spouse: Mike Maimone (m. 2023)
- Relatives: Lizzy Caplan (niece)

Howard Benjamin Bragman (February 24, 1956 – February 11, 2023) was an American crisis manager, public relations practitioner, writer and lecturer. He was often seen as a "PR guru".

Bragman later served as chairman of LaBrea Media, a crisis management company he founded in 2018.

== Early life and education ==
Howard Benjamin Bragman was born to a Jewish family in Flint, Michigan, on February 24, 1956, the son of Myrna (Wolin) and Leonard Bragman. He graduated with a B.A. in journalism and psychology from the University of Michigan in 1978. Later, Bragman acknowledged that the support of the LGBTQ+ Spectrum Center and the accepting atmosphere of the university helped him to come out.

== Career ==
Upon graduation, Bragman pursued a career in public relations and crisis management. After serving as a vice president in the Chicago and Los Angeles offices of Burson-Marsteller Public Relations, Bragman founded Bragman Nyman Cafarelli (BNC) in 1989. In 2001, BNC was purchased by Interpublic Group, a holding company for marketing firms. In 2005, Bragman established Fifteen Minutes, a strategic media and public relations agency. Bragman founded LaBrea Media in 2018 as a consultant, pundit, and content creator. Bragman was an adjunct professor of public relations at the University of Southern California's Annenberg Center for Communication from 1998 to 2003. He is the author of the best-selling book, Where's My Fifteen Minutes? (2008), through Penguin Portfolio.

In 2016, Bragman was approached by film producer Glen Zipper, who was working with Paul Haggis on Lead and Copper, a documentary about the Flint water crisis. Being a Flint native, Bragman joined Haggis' crew to assist with public relations and historical insight into the industrial era of the city. Bragman provided litigation support as a crisis counselor for cases and individuals including Joseph Steffan, Monica Lewinsky, her father Bernard and their family, and Sharon Smith in Smith v. Knoller. He was also involved with both the accusers and the accused in the MeToo movement. Bragman was vice chairman of the management firm Reputation.com.

As a publicist and LGBTQ activist, Bragman represented Sharon Osbourne, Anthony Scaramucci, Steven Slater, Stevie Wonder and Chaz Bono among others. As a "coming out" advisor, Bragman consulted a number of celebrities, including American actress and producer Meredith Baxter, basketball players John Amaechi and Sheryl Swoopes, country music artist Chely Wright, and NFL player Michael Sam. Bragman was an adjunct professor of public relations at the University of Southern California.

== Community work and charity endeavors ==
Bragman was active in the AIDS/HIV community on lesbian and gay civil rights, Jewish causes, and First Amendment protections. He received awards and honors from AIDS Project Los Angeles, Gay and Lesbian Alliance Against Defamation, and Congregation Kol Ami. Bragman was the founder of the Jewish Image Awards, honoring positive portrayals of Jews in television and film.

According to the online magazine MLive, "Bragman helped organize the February 2016 'Hollywood for Flint' benefit in California that raised more than $35,000 for the Flint Child Health and Development Fund of the Community Foundation of Greater Flint."

In September 2021, Bragman made a $1 million endowment to found the Howard Bragman Coming Out Fund at the University of Michigan. The fund will be managed by the Spectrum Center, an LGBTQIA+ support center that was formed at the college in 1970.

== Public appearances ==
Bragman was a news consultant for ABC News from 2010. He also made multiple appearances on local and network news programs including The Oprah Winfrey Show, Good Morning America, Today Show, and Larry King Live, as well as in national and local magazines and newspapers including Playboy, the Los Angeles Times, and others.

Bragman made an appearance on an episode of The Real Housewives of Beverly Hills season 2 as Camille Grammer's publicist, and was a guest judge on season 1 of RuPaul's Drag Race.

== Personal life ==
Bragman married Mike Maimone in 2023. He died from acute monocytic leukemia in Los Angeles on February 11, 2023, at age 66.
