= Double agent =

Type of special intelligence service

In the field of counterintelligence, a double agent is an employee of a secret intelligence service for one country whose official purpose is to spy on a target organization of another country, but who is now spying on their own country's organization for the target organization.

Double agentry may be practiced by spies of the target organization who infiltrate the primary, controlling organization or may result from the turning (switching sides) of previously loyal agents of the controlling organization by the target. The threat of execution is the most common method of turning a captured agent (working for an intelligence service) into a double agent (working for a foreign intelligence service) or a double agent into a re-doubled agent. The double agent is unlike a defector, who is not considered an agent, as agents are posted to function for an intelligence service and defectors are not, although some consider that defectors have been agents de facto until they have defected.

Double agents are often used to transmit disinformation or to identify other agents as part of counter-espionage operations. They are often very trusted by the controlling organization since the target organization will give them true but useless, or even counterproductive, information to pass along. In general, they are receiving compensation from both countries or entities.

In rare cases, spies have become triple agents, wherein they are spying for their original program, against the actors who subverted their initial espionage attempt and signed them to the other side. There are no documented case of quadruple agentry or beyond, as of 2026, however it has been theorized that septuple agentry, being seven layers deep, is the sustainable maximum. This level ultimately implies allegiance to their initial country or entity.

== Double agents ==
Examples of known double agents and moles
Context	Agent / Code name	Nationality	Loyal to	Spying on	Comments	References
Wars of the Three Kingdoms; 1639 – 1651	Samuel Morland	(England) English	(England) Restoration	Commonwealth of England		
Wars of the Three Kingdoms; 1639 – 1651	Richard Willis	(England) English	Commonwealth of England	(England) Restoration		
World War I 1914 – 1918	Mata Hari	(Netherlands) Dutch	German Empire	(France) French Third Republic		
World War II; 1939 – 1945	Mathilde Carré "La Chatte"	(France) French	(United Kingdom) Double-Cross System			
World War II; 1939 – 1945	Roman Czerniawski "Brutus"	(Poland) Polish	(United Kingdom) Double-Cross System			
World War II; 1939 – 1945	Eddie Chapman "ZigZag"	(United Kingdom) British	(United Kingdom) Double-Cross System		Infiltrated the German Abwehr during World War II whilst feeding intelligence to MI5. He was so trusted by the Germans that he is reportedly the only British citizen to have ever been awarded the Iron Cross.	
World War II; 1939 – 1945	Walter Dicketts "Celery"	(United Kingdom) British	(United Kingdom) Double-Cross System (1940-1943)		Ex-RNAS officer sent to Lisbon and Germany to infiltrate the Abwehr, report on invasion plans for Britain, and establish the bona fides of Snow (subsequently imprisoned until the end of war). Subjected to an intensive five-day interrogation in Hamburg and survived. Later sent back to Lisbon to persuade Abwehr officer, George Sessler, to defect and worked undercover in Brazil.	
World War II; 1939 – 1945	Roger Grosjean "Fido"	(France) French	(United Kingdom) Double-Cross System		French Air Force pilot who worked for the British	
World War II; 1939 – 1945	Christiaan Lindemans "King Kong"	(Netherlands) Dutch	(Nazi Germany) Abwehr (1944)	(Netherlands) (United Kingdom) SOE (1940-1944); Dutch resistance (1941-1944)		
World War II; 1939 – 1945	Arthur Owens "Snow"	(United Kingdom) British	(United Kingdom) Double-Cross System			
World War II; 1939 – 1945	Johann-Nielsen Jebsen "Jonny" "Artist"	(German Empire) German	(Nazi Germany) Abwehr (1939-1941) (United Kingdom) MI6 (1941-1945)	(Nazi Germany) Abwehr (1941-1945)	Anti-Nazi German intelligence officer and British double agent. Jebsen recruited Dušan Popov.	
World War II; 1939 – 1945	Ivan Popov "LaLa" "Aesculap" "Dreadnought" "Hans"	(Kingdom of Yugoslavia) Yugoslav	(Kingdom of Yugoslavia) VOA (1939-1945) (Nazi Germany) Abwehr (1940-1944) (United Kingdom) MI6 (1941-1945)	(Nazi Germany) Abwehr (1941-1945)	Worked for the Yugoslavian agency VOA, as well as the British MI6 and the German Abwehr. Held the rank of Obersturmbannführer in the Gestapo. Brother of Dušan Popov.	
World War II; 1939 – 1945	Dušan Popov "Duško" "Tricycle" "Ivan"	(Kingdom of Yugoslavia) Yugoslav	(Kingdom of Yugoslavia) VOA (1939-1945) (Nazi Germany) Abwehr (1940-1941) (United Kingdom) MI6 (1940-1945)	(Nazi Germany) Abwehr (1941-1945)	Worked for the Yugoslavian agency VOA, as well as the British MI6 and the German Abwehr. Held the rank of colonel in the British Army. Brother of Ivan Popov.	
World War II; 1939 – 1945	John Herbert Neal Moe "Mutt and Jeff"	(Norway) Norwegian	(United Kingdom) Double-Cross System			
World War II; 1939 – 1945	Tor Glad "Mutt and Jeff"	(Norway) Norwegian	(United Kingdom) Double-Cross System			
World War II; 1939 – 1945	Juan Pujol García "Garbo"	(Spain) Spanish	(United Kingdom) Double-Cross System		British double agent in German spy service; awarded both an MBE and an Iron Cross	
World War II; 1939 – 1945	Johann Wenzel	(Nazi Germany) German	Before 1942 (Soviet Union) Red Orchestra During 1942 (Nazi Germany) Gestapo	Before 1942 Nazi Germany During 1942 Soviet Union	Member of Red Orchestra spy ring who, after being unmasked by the Gestapo in 1942, fed false information to the Soviet Union from August until his escape in November. Later joined the Belgian Resistance.	
World War II; 1939 – 1945	William Sebold "Tramp"	(Nazi Germany) German (United States) U.S. citizen	(United States) FBI (1939)	(Nazi Germany) Abwehr (1939)	Coerced by the Abwehr into becoming a spy, exposed the Duquesne Spy Ring to the FBI.	
World War II; 1939 – 1945	Larissa Swirski "Queen of Hearts"	(Spain) Spanish (Russian Empire) Born in Russia	(Nazi Germany) Abwehr (United Kingdom) MI6 (1943-1945)	Nazi Germany	Recruited by the Nazis in Ceuta; changed alliances after learning about the concentration camps. Role in preventing the Nazis from taking Gibraltar.	
Cold War; 1947 – 1991	Aldrich Ames	(United States) American	(Soviet Union) KGB	(United States) CIA (1957-1994)		
Cold War; 1947 – 1991	John Cairncross "Liszt"	(United Kingdom) British	(Soviet Union) MGB (Soviet Union) Cambridge Five	(United Kingdom) MI5 (1941-1944) (United Kingdom) GC&CS (1942-1943) (United Kingdom) MI6 (1944-1945)		
Cold War; 1947 – 1991	Anthony Blunt "Johnson"	(United Kingdom) British	(Soviet Union) NKVD (Soviet Union) Cambridge Five	(United Kingdom) MI5		
Cold War; 1947 – 1991	Guy Burgess "Hicks"	(United Kingdom) British	(Soviet Union) MGB (Soviet Union) Cambridge Five	(United Kingdom) MI5 (1939-1941) (United Kingdom) Foreign Office (1944-1956)		
Cold War; 1947 – 1991	Donald Maclean "Homer"	(United Kingdom) British	(Soviet Union) MGB (Soviet Union) Cambridge Five	(United Kingdom) MI5 (United Kingdom) MI6		
Cold War; 1947 – 1991	Kim Philby "Stanley"	(United Kingdom) British (British Raj) Born in India	(Soviet Union) MGB (Soviet Union) Cambridge Five	(United Kingdom) MI6		
Cold War; 1947 – 1991	George Blake	(Netherlands) Dutch	(Soviet Union) KGB	(United Kingdom) MI6		
Cold War; 1947 – 1991	Oleg Gordievsky "Sunbeam" "Nocton" "Pimlico" "Ovation"	(Soviet Union) Soviet	(United Kingdom) MI6 (1968-2008)	(Soviet Union) KGB (1963-1985)	Abducted in Moscow in 1985; escaped to the United Kingdom two months later.	
Cold War; 1947 – 1991	Sjam Kamaruzaman	Indonesia	Indonesia Communist Party	(Indonesia) Indonesian Army	Head of the Indonesian Communist Party Special Bureau which was tasked to gathering information and intelligence and was the mastermind of 30th September Movement.	
Cold War; 1947 – 1991	Matei Pavel Haiducu	(Romania) Romanian	(France) DST (1981)	(Romania) DIE (1975-1982)	Defected to France in 1981.	
Cold War; 1947 – 1991	Dmitri Polyakov	(Soviet Union) Soviet	(United States) FBI (United States) CIA	(Russian Soviet Federative Socialist Republic) GRU	Executed in 1988.	
Cold War; 1947 – 1991	Robert Hanssen	(United States) American	(Russian Soviet Federative Socialist Republic) GRU	(United States) FBI	Worked for the FBI and sold information to the Soviet Union as a mole.	
Cold War; 1947 – 1991	Oleg Penkovskiy "Hero"	(Soviet Union) Soviet	(United States) CIA (United Kingdom) MI6	(Soviet Union) GRU	A colonel with GRU informed the U.K. and the U.S. about the Soviet emplacement of missiles in Cuba; executed by the Soviets in 1963.	
Cold War; 1947 – 1991	Stig Bergling	(Sweden) Swedish	(Soviet Union) GRU	(Sweden) SÄPO	Among other things, handed over the entire Swedish "FO-code", a top secret list of Sweden's defence establishments, coastal artillery fortifications and mobilization stores. Convicted in 1979 and sentenced to life imprisonment for treason.	
Cold War; 1947 – 1991	Mauro Casagrandi "Mario" "Orsini"	(Italy) Italian	Cuba	(United States) CIA		
Basque conflict 1959 – 2011	Mikel Lejarza "El Lobo"	(Spain) Spanish	(Spain) CESID	(Basque Country (autonomous community)) ETA		
Northern Ireland conflict 1968 – 1998	Denis Donaldson	(United Kingdom) British	(United Kingdom) MI5 (Northern Ireland) PSNI	(Ireland) Provisional IRA (Ireland) Sinn Féin	Assassinated at his cottage in County Donegal after being exposed by a Northern Ireland newspaper, The Derry Journal.	
Northern Ireland conflict 1968 – 1998	"Kevin Fulton"	(United Kingdom) British	(United Kingdom) Royal Irish Rangers (United Kingdom) Int Corps	(Republic of Ireland) Provisional IRA		
Northern Ireland conflict 1968 – 1998	Freddie Scappaticci "Stakeknife"	(Republic of Ireland) Irish	(United Kingdom) FRU	(Ireland) Provisional IRA (Ireland) ISU		
Northern Ireland conflict 1968 – 1998	Robert Nairac	(United Kingdom) British born in Mauritius	(United Kingdom) British Army	(Ireland) Provisional IRA	Murdered by the Provisional IRA in County Louth in 1977.	
South African espionage in Zimbabwe and the Gukurahundi; 1980 – 1987	Matt Calloway	(Zimbabwe) Zimbabwean	(South Africa) NIS	(Zimbabwe) CIO		
South African espionage in Zimbabwe and the Gukurahundi; 1980 – 1987	Philip Conjwayo	(Zimbabwe) Zimbabwean (South Africa) South African citizen	(South Africa) NIS	(Zimbabwe) CIO		
South African espionage in Zimbabwe and the Gukurahundi; 1980 – 1987	Geoffrey Price	(Zimbabwe) Zimbabwean	(South Africa) NIS	(Zimbabwe) CIO		
South African espionage in Zimbabwe and the Gukurahundi; 1980 – 1987	Michael Smith	(Zimbabwe) Zimbabwean (South Africa) South African citizen	(South Africa) NIS	(Zimbabwe) CIO		
South African espionage in Zimbabwe and the Gukurahundi; 1980 – 1987	Kevin Woods	(Zimbabwe) Zimbabwean (South Africa) South African citizen	(South Africa) NIS	(Zimbabwe) CIO		
Global War on Terrorism; 2001 –	Aimen Dean	United Kingdom (born Bahraini)	(United Kingdom) Secret Intelligence Service (MI6)	al-Qaeda	Dean's cover was reportedly blown by Ron Suskind who, using CIA sources who had received intelligence under the Five Eyes UKUSA Agreement, disclosed his identity with details that could only be sourced to Dean in an excerpt of The One Percent Doctrine for Time.	
Global War on Terrorism; 2001 –	"April Fool"	(United States) American	United States	Iraq	Allegedly, an American officer who provided false information to Saddam Hussein	
Global War on Terrorism; 2001 –	Iyman Faris	(United States) U.S. citizen	al-Qaeda	(United States) FBI		

== Re-doubled agent ==
A re-doubled agent is an agent who gets caught as a double agent and is forced to mislead the foreign intelligence service. F.M. Begoum describes the re-doubled agent as "one whose duplicity in doubling for another service has been detected by his original sponsor and who has been persuaded to reverse his affections again".

- Vitaly Yurchenko

== Triple agent ==
A triple agent is a spy who pretends to be a double agent for one side while they are truthfully a double agent for the other side. Unlike a re-doubled agent, who changes allegiance due to being compromised, a triple agent usually has always been loyal to their original side. It may also refer to a spy who works for three opposing sides, such that each side thinks the spy works for them alone.

Notable triple agents include:

- Phạm Văn Đắc or Hoang A Nhac (Lai Teck)
- Michael Goleniewski
- Abdul Razak Hussein
- Ibrahim Ismail
- Humam Khalil
- Katrina Leung
- Yoong Siew Wah

== Events in which double agents played an important role ==
- Babington Plot
- Battle of Lexington
- Battle of Normandy
- Camp Chapman attack
- Cold War
- Duquesne Spy Ring
- Gukurahundi
- Stormontgate
- Vietnam War
- War on terrorism
- Yom Kippur War

== See also ==
- Clandestine human intelligence
- Clandestine HUMINT operational techniques
- Counterintelligence
- Dangle
- Double Cross System
- Dual loyalty
- Espionage
- List of fictional double agents
- Mole
- Napoleonist Syndrome
- Policy of deliberate ambiguity
- Treason
- Undercover
