= Mutt and Jeff (disambiguation) =

Mutt and Jeff is a comic strip created by Bud Fisher in 1907.

Mutt and Jeff may also refer to:

- Mutt and Jeff (spies), two spies for the Allies in World War II
- "Mutt and Jeff", a method of interrogation, also called Good cop, bad cop
