= Haroon Khan =

Haroon Khan may refer to:

- Haroon Khan (boxer), a British Pakistani boxer
- Haroon Khan (senator, in office 2006–2012), a Pakistan Muslim League member of the Senate of Pakistan from Punjab, March 2006 to March 2012
- Haroon Akhtar Khan, a Pakistan Muslim League member of the Senate of Pakistan from Punjab, March 2018 to October 2018
