= Haroon Rashid Aswat =

Islamic terrorist (born 1974)

- Born: 22 September 1974 (age 52); Yorkshire, England, UK
- Criminal charges: United States: Conspiracy to provide material support to a foreign terrorist organization (1 count); providing material support to a foreign terrorist organization (1 count)
- Criminal penalty: 20 years in prison

Haroon Rashid Aswat (Gujarati: હારૂન રશીદ અસવત; born 22 September 1974) is a British terrorist who has been linked to the 7 July 2005 bombings in London. American officials allege that he has ties to al Qaeda, and sought his extradition to the United States, which was supported by the British government. After his internment in Broadmoor Hospital in 2008, in 2010 the European Court of Human Rights blocked efforts to extradite Aswat due to concerns over the conditions of his potential imprisonment in the United States. This decision was upheld on 11 September 2013. Aswat was extradited in October 2014, after the American government gave assurances to the British High Court that he would receive satisfactory care; in January 2015, the European Court of Human Rights ruled that his extradition was legal. At his trial in New York in March 2015, Aswat pleaded guilty to charges of conspiring to set up a terrorist training camp in Oregon and, in October that year, was sentenced to 20 years in prison, with "specialised psychiatric care". He was deported back to the UK in 2022, where he was detained in hospital.

== Early life ==
Haroon Rashid Aswat was born in Yorkshire on 22 September 1974, to a Muslim family with roots in Gujarat, India, and raised in Dewsbury, West Yorkshire.

== Activities ==
From 1995, he became associated with Abu Hamza al-Masri and the Finsbury Park Mosque. There, he helped to organise 200 UK-based men of Pakistani origin to engage in terrorism in Jammu and Kashmir. The group later deployed to Bosnia to join Abdelkader Mokhtari's new battalion Harkat ul-Ansar, based in Zenica.

In 1999, Aswat, Abu Hamza, Oussama Kassir and American-born convert James Ujaama, attempted to establish a jihad training camp for young Muslims, at the Dog Cry Ranch in Bly, Oregon, United States. During this period, Aswat lived in Seattle, Washington for over a month.

After the project failed, he began a period of travel around the world. By 2002, he was at a religious school in Lahore, hosted by Mohammed al-Ghabra. In November 2004 he met in Pakistan with the ringleader of the London 7/7 attack, Mohammad Sidique Khan, and accomplice Shehzad Tanweer.

By late 2004 and early 2005, Aswat was resident in South Africa. US authorities tried to extradite him with regards the Oregon camp project, but as he was a British Citizen who had committed no crimes in South Africa, the South African authorities refused the extradition request. After the London 7/7 bombings, local South African newspapers reported that Aswat had been living a quiet life there for at least five months. Neighbors and co-workers described Aswat as "a family man" and said that he showed no apparent interest in radical Islamic politics.

In late June 2005, he arrived in the UK, through the Port of Felixstowe. He then left again via Heathrow Airport on 7 July 2005 for India, hours before the July 2005 London bombings.

== Allegations of terrorism ==
American counter-terrorism officials state that they began investigating Aswat in 2002. In reporting on Oussama Kassir's 2009 trial Oregon Live described Lebanese-born Swedish militant Kassir and Aswat taking a bus from the east coast to Oregon. According to The Sunday Herald, by 1999, Aswat was calling himself a "hit man" for bin Laden.

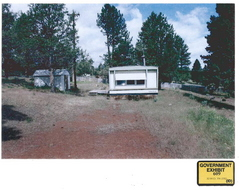
During the 2009 trial of Lebanese-born Swedish militant Islamist Oussama Kassir, prosecutors alleged he and Haroon Aswat traveled to Bly, Oregon to provide military training at the Dog Cry Ranch.

American and British counter-terrorism officials stated that they found Aswat's passport on a man killed in action in Afghanistan in early 2003, and believed him to be Aswat.

In the first two weeks following the 7 July 2005 bombings, police sources initially told newspapers that Aswat made some 20 mobile phone calls to two of the suspected bombers just hours before the blasts. On 31 July 2005, following a more thorough forensic analysis of the remains of the bombers' phones, The Times reported that: "British investigators, examining whether telephone calls were made between the London bombers and Aswat before the attacks of 7/7, caution that the calls may have been made to a phone linked to Aswat, rather than the man himself."

The New York Times quoted unnamed security officials that when Aswat's presence was brought to the attention of American authorities, that they wanted to subject him to an extraordinary rendition. The New York Times sources said British officials objected, stating that "He's got U.K. papers, and they said you can't render somebody with U.K. papers."

On 29 July 2005, during an interview on Fox News a former US prosecutor named John Loftus, asserted that Aswat was a double agent, backed by MI6. Loftus claimed that MI6 intervened to protect Aswat while he was trying to evade capture.

== Arrest and extradition to the United Kingdom ==
Having travelled via Pakistan, Aswat was arrested in Zambia on 20 July 2005. He was deported from Zambia to the UK on 7 August 2005 and arrested on his arrival. Following Aswat's capture his family issued a press release, stating that Aswat "has not lived at this house and we have not had contact with him for many years... there is no story that we can provide."

== U.S. extradition proceedings and trial ==
Once Aswat was transferred to the United Kingdom, he was held in detention on a U.S. arrest warrant. American justice officials sought to try Aswat for his alleged role in setting up the Oregon training camp in 1999.

A British judge approved Aswat's extradition on 30 November 2006, discounting the concern Aswat's lawyers expressed that there was "a real risk" Aswat would face inhumane treatment in U.S. custody. But in 2008 he was transferred to Broadmoor Hospital, a high-security psychiatric hospital after being diagnosed with paranoid schizophrenia.

In 2010, the European Court of Human Rights blocked the extradition orders of Aswat, Abu Hamza, Babar Ahmad and Syed Talha Ahsan.

On 16 April 2013, the European Court of Human Rights decided that Aswat's extradition to the U. S. would violate his right for protection against inhumane treatment, given his mental state. The UK Government appealed for the case to be reconsidered by the court's Grand Chamber, but on 11 September 2013 that was rejected.

In September 2014, the UK High Court approved Aswat's extradition to the U.S., after it had received assurances from the U.S. Government that he would receive "satisfactory care" there. The High Court's written ruling stated, "In light of the specific assurances and additional information received from the United States government, and the careful examination of the case by the High Court in the United Kingdom, the court found that it could not be said that there was a real risk that Mr Aswat would be subjected to treatment contrary to Article 3 if extradited." Aswat was extradited to the U.S. in October 2014, and in January 2015, The European Court of Human Rights ruled that his extradition was legal.

At his trial in New York in March 2015, Aswat pleaded guilty to the charge of conspiring with Abu Hamza to set up a terrorist training camp in Oregon. In October that year, the U.S. District Judge sentenced Aswat to 20 years in prison, and ordered the federal prisons bureau to provide him with "specialised psychiatric care". Aswat was deported back to the UK in 2022, where he was detained in hospital.

In April 2025 the High Court of Justice found that Aswat could be released after completing treatment for his mental illness, despite counter-terror police believing he was still a threat to national security.
