= Earnest James Ujaama =

American community activist (born 1965 or 1966)

- عبد القادر
- Born: James Earnest Thompson; 1966 (age 58–59); Denver, Colorado, U.S.
- Other names: Bilal Ahmed; Abu Samayya; Abdul Qaadir
- Education: B.A. – University of Washington; MA. Ed. – Antioch University; Ph.D. - Walden University
- Website: drujaama.com

Earnest James Ujaama (born 1966) is an American community activist and former terrorist.

A long-term resident of Seattle and well-known community activist, Ujaama was arrested under terrorism charges in July 2002, the first American to be detained on US soil while under investigation using the Patriot Act. Amid conflicting reports and media coverage of the extent of his involvement in terrorist networks, he was convicted three times of various offences, in 2003, 2007, and 2015. He cooperated extensively with the government and testified against other terrorists, and since 2015 has embarked upon an academic career.

== Early life ==
Ujaama was born James Earnest Thompson in Denver in 1966, and moved to Seattle at the age of 5. He was born a Catholic. His mother was a social worker at the Central Area Motivation Program. At the age of 9, Thompson began a business in raking leaves; at the age of 14, he started a business in home maintenance. Thompson studied at Ingraham High School. Before he graduated from high school, he enrolled in the University of Washington, but dropped out after two years.

In the mid-1980s, Thompson moved to Pelican, Alaska, where he worked at a seafood company. At age 22, Thompson bought and ran a computer store in the University District of Seattle, renaming it Campus Computers. He sold it after six months. He worked for Olympic Computers selling IBM computers, but was accused of carrying out scams on his customers. He was later found to have never filed a tax return.

Thompson was a mentor working with gangs and trouble youth. He wrote the motivational book The Young People's Guide to Starting a Business Without Selling Drugs and the semi-autobiographical novel Coming Up, which were well received. He moved to Los Angeles to try to make his novel into a movie, without success.

In the early 1990s, Thompson changed his name to Earnest James Ujaama; he had followed his brother Mustafa Ujaama – born Jon Thompson – who had converted to Islam earlier while in the military.

In 1993, Ujaama, funded by a grant from the city of Seattle, taught a class at Seattle Vocational Institute. Ujaama was invited to speak at the 1994 NAACP convention in Chicago. On June 10, 1994, then-state representative Jesse Wineberry declared it to be "James Ujaama Day" in the state of Washington.

== Conversion to Islam ==
In late 1996, Ujaama returned to Seattle, where he converted to Islam circa 1997. Ujaama then moved to London and studied under Jamaican-born cleric Abdullah el-Faisal. Moving between London and Seattle, Ujaama eventually started selling tapes of el-Faisal's sermons, but kept the proceeds. While in London, Ujaama married a Muslim woman from Somalia. In late 1998, Ujaama spent two weeks in a jihad training camp in Afghanistan. Ujaama later studied under Abu Hamza al-Masri, attending the Finsbury Park Mosque.

In late 1999, Ujaama returned to the United States, where he learned about a ranch in Bly, Oregon. That October, he traveled to the ranch, where he carried out firearm practice; he sent a fax to Abu Hamza al-Masri to promote this idea, but he greatly exaggerated his progress. He also drafted a flyer that said "Get away from dunia [earthly matters] and be among Muslims!", advertising a cost of £660/US$1,100 (including airfare).

In November/December 1999, Oussama Kassir and Haroon Aswat (emissaries from Abu Hamza) came to Bly to inspect the property. (They arrived in New York City on an Air India flight on November 26, 1999; afterwards, they took a Greyhound bus to Seattle, and were then driven by Ujaama to Bly.) However, Kassir and Aswat realized upon their arrival that there was nothing in the ranch, and that Ujaama had been running a scam.

In January 2000, Ujaama moved back to London. From 2000 to 2001, Ujaama (under the alias Bilal Ahmed) operated the Supporters of Shariah website, which was used to advocate for "violent jihad".

During this period, Ujaama was also known as Abu Samayya or Abdul Qaadir.

== Terrorism charges ==
On July 22 2002, Ujaama was arrested in Denver under a material witness warrant, becoming the first American to be detained on US soil while under investigation using the Patriot Act. He was charged by federal grand jury on August 28, 2002. The lead FBI agent in the case testified that he did not believe Ujaama needed to be locked up.

In 2003, Ujaama agreed to cooperate with US authorities in return for a plea deal, receiving two years in jail. He admitted that he had travelled to Afghanistan in 2000 to deliver money and computer equipment to the Taliban, a violation of the International Emergency Economic Powers Act. Ujaama agreed to testify against Abu Hamza, Oussama Kassir, and Haroon Aswat. All three were charged by prosecutors, but resisted extradition. The government dropped all other terrorism, conspiracy and firearms charges Ujaama had been indicted on. Scholar of Muslim-American history Edward E. Curtis later wrote, "Some readers may regard the original indictment as evidence of the threat posed by Islamic terror; for others, it may be proof that the government is using or abusing the war on terror to prosecute its larger foreign policy objectives and domestic agendas."

In December 2006, after his release, Ujaama fled to Belize. On his return to the US, new charges of conspiring to provide and conceal material support or resources to terrorists, providing material support or resources to terrorists and unlawful flight to avoid giving testimony were brought, to which he again pled guilty. He was sentenced to four further years in jail. He cooperated with authorities, meeting with prosecutors over 70 times and eventually testifying at the trials of Oussama Kassir and Abu Hamza al-Masri.

On October 23, 2015, Ujaama was convicted for a third time at a US district court in Manhattan. He was sentenced to time served, with US attorney John P. Cronan calling his cooperation "extraordinary" and "largely unprecedented".

== Later life ==
Since 2015, Ujaama has worked as a trucker and travelled overseas. In a 2021 interview, he said the case against him was "a farce" and accused the US Justice Department of misrepresenting the camp he trained at by falsely linking it to al-Qaida. He said, "I don't feel like I didn't do anything immoral or wrong … I believed in what I was doing … All these things get turned around and twisted around."

In 2021, Ujaama received a PhD from the School of Criminal Justice at Walden University; his thesis is titled Modern Black Codes: Presidential Crime Control Rhetoric and Black Criminalization.

== Selected bibliography ==
- Ujaama, Ej. (1991). Young People's Guide to Starting a Business. Self-published.
- Ujaama, Ej. (1993). Entrepreneur Basics 101. Seattle, WA: Be Your Own Boss Publishing.
- Ujaama, Ej. (1994). How to Be An Entrepreneur. Seattle, WA: Be Your Own Boss Publishing.
- Ujaama, Ej. (1996). Coming Up. Seattle, WA: Inner-City Publishing.
