= Haroon Ullah =

- Born: c. 1977; Canada
- Education: Whitman College; Harvard University; University of Michigan
- Occupations: Author; publicist; diplomat; scholar
- Spouse: Naba Sharif
- Website: haroonullah.wordpress.com

Haroon K. Ullah is an American author, educator, scholar, diplomat, publicist and researcher specializing in his work on South Asia and the Middle East, in particular in Pakistan and Afghanistan. Ullah has co-authored six books on political science and geopolitics, including Vying for Allah's Vote: Understanding Islamic Parties, Political Violence, and Extremism in Pakistan, The Bargain From The Bazaar: A Family's Day of Reckoning in Lahore and Digital World War, among others. He has been a contributor to various news outlets and the US Department of State, writing primarily about foreign and domestic affairs in the US and abroad.

While serving as chief strategy officer of the U.S. Agency for Global Media, Ullah submitted about $34,000 in falsified travel and expense claims, and he lost a Senior Executive Service post that paid $160,000 a year. He pleaded guilty to theft of government property in June 2019 and in November was sentenced to three months in prison.

== Early life, family and education ==
Haroon Ullah was born in Canada circa 1977 to a family of immigrants from Pakistan. When Haroon Ullah was three years old, his father, Muhammed Kaleem Ullah, worked as a nuclear engineer with the United States Department of Energy's contractor in the Eastern Washington. The family moved to Tri-Cities, Washington, where Ullah was raised, and he graduated from Richland High School in 1995.

Ullah subsequently attended Whitman College in Walla Walla, Washington and in 1999, he received a Bachelor of Arts diploma in politics. After completing a Thomas J. Watson Fellowship, Ullah then continued his education for master's degree at Harvard University's John F. Kennedy School of Government, where he studied public administration in International Development. Ullah graduated from Harvard in 2002. Thereafter Ullah earned a joint PhD in political science and public policy from University of Michigan.

== Academic career ==
While earning his doctorate from the University of Michigan, Ullah was a senior research fellow at its Belfer Center for Science and International Affairs for the Dubai initiative with the focus in his work on counterterrorism and religious political parties in the Middle East and South Asia. He also served as Adjunct Assistant Professor at the Center for Security Studies of Georgetown University's School of Foreign Service, and he was a term member of the Council on Foreign Relations at the time.

Ullah's works have been noted and reviewed by various publications and literary critics, including Vanity Fair, Politico, National Public Radio (NPR), The Express Tribune, The Wall Street Journal, and The Independent, among others. He has discussed in journalistic publications his work, observations and analysis as well.

== Public service ==
In 2010, Ullah joined the United States Department of State (DOS), where he served in various positions as counterterrorism consultant and researcher on Islamist politics in Pakistan and Afghanistan on Secretary of State John Kerry's Policy Planning Staff as well as Secretary Rex Tillerson's. Ullah also worked for the Embassy of the United States in Islamabad, Pakistan. He was also a member of the Afghanistan-Pakistan Policy Team (AF-PAK) led by the US Ambassador to the United Nations Richard Holbrooke.

In October 2017, Ullah was assigned to a position of the Chief Strategy Officer at the U.S. Agency for Global Media, where part of his responsibility was to oversee Radio y Televisión Martí, Voice of America, and other government broadcast operations.

In June 2019, Ullah pleaded guilty to theft of government property. Over nine months in 2018 he had inflated Uber fares, invented hotel stays, billed the government for travel to visit family and to promote his book, and forged a doctor's note stating that knee pain required him to fly first class; he also lied to his insurer about tree damage to his house in Alexandria. An agency travel specialist uncovered the scheme after telephoning two New York hotels at which he claimed to have stayed, neither of which had any record of him, and investigators found dozens of fabricated hotel invoices. In November 2019 Judge T. S. Ellis III rejected an agreement to recommend two months in jail, which Ullah had hoped to serve on weekends, and imposed three months in prison, more than prosecutors had sought. "You steal this much money from the government, there has to be a significant consequence," Ellis said. He also ordered 30 hours of community service, to consist of telling senior government officials not to falsify expense documents.

== Honors and awards ==
- J. William Fulbright Fellow
- Harvard University Presidential Scholar
- National Security Education Program Fellow
- Woodrow Wilson Public Service Fellow
- Peabody Award for Burka Avenger (TV animation)

== Bibliography ==
- Vying for Allah's Vote: Understanding Islamic Parties, Political Violence, and Extremism in Pakistan (2013), Georgetown University Press, ISBN 9781626160163
- The Bargain From The Bazaar: A Family's Day of Reckoning in Lahore (2014), PublicAffairs, ISBN 9781610391672
- Digital World War: Islamists, Extremists, and the Fight for Cyber Supremacy (2017), Yale University Press ISBN 9780300210231
- Digital Rebels: Islamists, Social Media and the New Democracy (2018), Yale University Press, ISBN 9780300207187
- Bob Pearson, Haroon K. Ullah, Dan Zehr, Countering Hate (2018), Social Science, ISBN 9780999662304
- House of Heroin: Inside the Secret Billion-Dollar Narco-Terror Empire That Is Killing America, (2020), HarperCollins ISBN 9780062464019
