= Jahan Salehi =

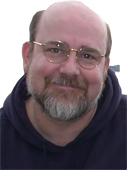
- Born: 1954 (age 71–72); Tehran, Iran
- Education: Transylvania University
- Occupations: Entrepreneur, writer and activist
- Known for: Syndication Director of Agence Global

Jahan Salehi is an Iranian-American entrepreneur and progressive activist, He has worked for Agence Global, a left-leaning news and commentary syndicate, and as Managing Director of the Los Angeles Times Syndicate's European operations (now part of Tribune Media Services).

He has written on technology ("Telecommunications" in The Columbia History of the 20th Century New York: 1998, Searching the Internet: An In-depth Guide for Professionals, Scientists and Researchers New York: 1995) and publishing, as well as film reviews and commentaries.

== Early life and education ==
Jahan Salehi was born in Iran in 1954 to an American mother and Iranian father. His family moved to the United States in 1960, and he grew up in Lexington, Kentucky, attending Transylvania University.

He graduated of Transylvania University (1976, BA, Humanities) and Columbia University (1986, MA, History). He author a number of technology and history articles, including a chapter entitled "Telecommunications in the 20th Century" in the Columbia Encyclopedia of the 20th Century, New York: (co-authored with Richard Bulliet) and an early guide to Internet search engines and their use.

== Career ==
As a freelance photographer in the late 1970s, he traveled throughout Europe, the Middle East, and Africa. He did graduate work at Ohio State University (Middle East studies) and with Richard Bulliet at Columbia University (History, Middle East and Africa).

From 1988 to 1999, he founded and was chief executive officer of several technology and health information companies in Vermont (Maya Computer), New York (Solute Inc.), and North Carolina (Healant Inc.). A regular speaker at Macworld Expo, Salehi worked closely with Stuart Gitlow at America Online and at Healant, the company Salehi and Gitlow launched together. Healant designed and built medical and consumer sites for AOL, Dr. Drew, Dr. Koop, and dozens of HMO or disease-specific medical providers, getting funded by venture capital firms eager to capitalize on the dot-com boom.

Salehi left Healant to be Managing Director of European Operations of the Los Angeles Times Syndicate (now Tribune Media Services International), based in London from 2001-2003. In 2004, he founded a progressive commentary agency called Agence Global, which syndicates the columns of Rami G. Khouri, Patrick Seale, Immanuel Wallerstein, Richard W. Bulliet, as well as the left/liberal magazines The Nation, Le Monde diplomatique, and the "Washington Spectator".
