= Haroonabad =

Haroonabad (Urdu: ہارون آباد) may refer to:

- Haroonabad, Punjab, a city in Punjab, Pakistan
- Haroonabad (Karachi), a neighbourhood in Karachi, Pakistan

== See also ==
- Harun, the Islamic form of the name of Aaron, the elder brother of Moses
- Haroon a Muslim name
