= Larissa Swirski =

Russian photographer and spy

- Born: 1910; Odesa, Russian Empire
- Died: 13 May 1977 (aged 66–67); Seville, Spain
- Spouse: Manuel Romero Hume
- Children: Liana Romero Swirski
- Espionage activity
- Allegiance: Germany; United Kingdom
- Service branch: Intelligence Service (MI6)
- Service years: 1943–1945
- Codename: Queen of Hearts
- Nickname: Mata Hari of the South

Larissa Swirski (1910 – 13 May 1977), spelled as Swirsky in some media, was a Ukrainian photographer and double-agent spy, known as the Mata Hari of the South and the Queen of Hearts, who helped defeat the Nazis during World War II. She also provided the inspiration for the character of Vesper Lynd in Ian Fleming's James Bond series.

== Biography ==
She was a descendant of the Romanov family. Like the rest of the nobility of the Russian Empire, her family fled after the Bolshevik Revolution. Swrisky was evacuated with her grandparents and sisters on a warship sent by king George V of the United Kingdom in 1917, ending up in Berlin. She later moved to Paris with her sister and grandmother, where she opened a photography studio and took pictures of relevant figures such as Rudolph Valentino, Marlene Dietrich or Josephine Baker, and got involved with figures like Salvador Dalí and Coco Chanel, acting as a Russian interpreter for the latter. In Cannes she met Manuel Romero Hume, a Spanish naval and military aviator whom she married.

After the Spanish Civil War, she stayed with her husband in his destination in Ceuta. There she was recruited by a German spy in 1940, at 29 years old. She agreed to work for the Germans under the condition that they help her recover her properties in her homeland and locate her parents' burial site. During this period, she operated in the areas of Tétouan, Ceuta and Tangier. When her husband was transferred to Puente Mayorga, Andalusia, Swrisky began operating in the Strait of Gibraltar area.

In 1943, through her sister Ala, a member of the French Resistance, she learnt about the crimes Nazis were carrying in the extermination camps and decided to switch sides, becoming a double agent for the British government. Her superior in the British Intelligence Service was David Scherr, to whom she presented herself as the Queen of Hearts. Her daughter, Liana Romero Swirsky, became the youngest Spanish spy in the Second World War, acting as a cover for her mother. Together, they played a key role in preventing the Nazis from taking Gibraltar.

She worked with then-member of the Naval Intelligence, Ian Fleming, and Clark Gable offered her an acting career in Hollywood. Swrisky retired after Hitler's demise, fearing reprisals that could affect her husband, who was stationed in Seville. She spoke six languages.

She died in Seville on 13 May 1977.

== Legacy ==
Ian Fleming was inspired by Swirski to create the character of the first "Bond girl" Vesper Lynd, the female rival of James Bond, who appears in his debut novel Casino Royale. Journalist Wayne Jameson talked about her in a chapter of his book Esvásticas en el sur (Swastikas in the South).

In 2022, a documentary about her life titled Queen of Hearts was released, directed by Chema Ramos.
