= Eduardo Delgado Rodríguez =

Cuban brigadier general

Brigadier General Eduardo Delgado Rodríguez
- Born: 1941
- Died: 28 June 2017 (aged 75–76) Havana, Cuba
- Allegiance: Cuba
- Rank: Brigadier General
- Commands: Dirección de Inteligencia

Eduardo Delgado Rodríguez (Note: In this Spanish name, the first or paternal surname is Delgado and the second or maternal family name is Rodríguez.) was a Cuban brigadier general and chief of the Cuban Intelligence Directorate. His office had the code name MX.

== Career ==
=== Intelligence Directorate activities ===
Involved in a number of foreign intelligence activities, Delgado Rodríguez was the alleged overseer of a 1996 incident in which four Brothers to the Rescue pilots were killed after being shot down by Cuban Mikoyan planes. The involvement of the Intelligence Directorate was revealed by Stuart Hoyt Jr., a retired FBI agent, during the trial of five individuals accused of spying for Cuba. Delgado Rodríguez was also the chief investigator in the trial and eventual execution of Arnaldo Ochoa for treason and drug trafficking in 1989. Delgado was quoted as saying in a news conference in 1991 that he and intelligence agents had stopped a "U.S.-backed attempt to create an opposition group on the island" started by exiles and dissidents in Spain and Cuba, respectively.
