= Intelligence Directorate (Cuba) =

Cuba's main intelligence agency

Coordinates: 23°08′18″N 82°23′55″W

Agency overview
- Formed: 1961
- Jurisdiction: Ministry of the Interior (MININT)
- Headquarters: Havana, Cuba
- Employees: 15,000
- Minister responsible: Lázaro Alberto Álvarez Casas, Minister of the Interior

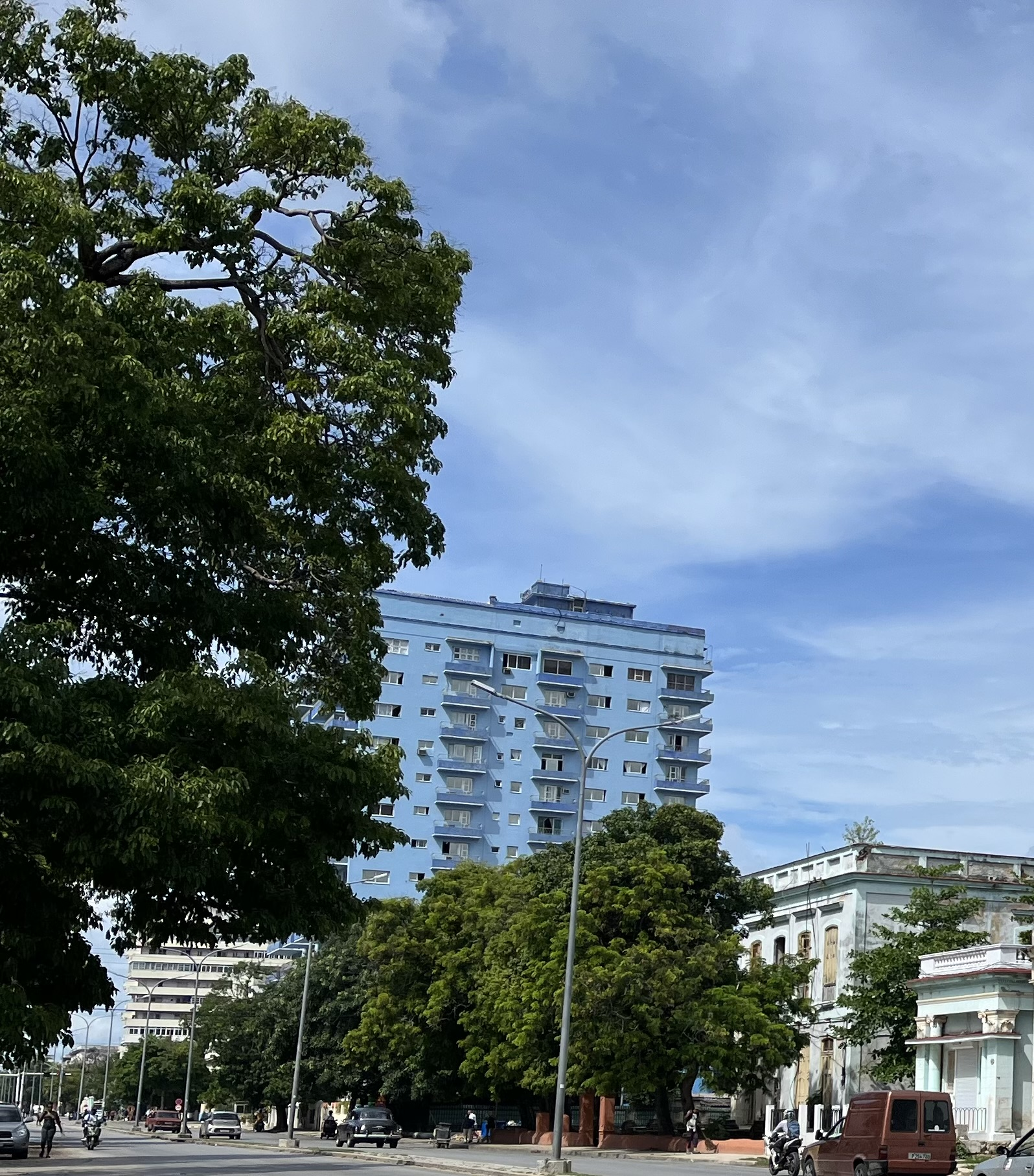
The G2 building in Havana

The Intelligence Directorate (Spanish: Dirección de Inteligencia, DI), commonly known as G2 and formerly named Dirección General de Inteligencia (DGI), is the main state intelligence agency of the Government of Cuba. It was founded in 1961 by Cuba's Ministry of the Interior, shortly after the Cuban Revolution. The DI is responsible for foreign intelligence and comprises six divisions divided into two categories: the Operational Division and the Support Division.

Manuel "Redbeard" Piñeiro was the first director of the DI in 1961 and his term lasted until 1964. Another top leader who directed the famous office, located on Linea and A. Vedado, was the now retired Div. General Jesús Bermúdez Cutiño. He was transferred from being the chief of the Army Intelligence (DIM) to the Ministry of Interior, after the corruption trials and executions of Arnaldo Ochoa and José Abrantes Fernández, in 1989.

The total number of people working for the DI is about 15,000. Given Cuba's small size, the DI is considered to be an especially effective agency, which "punches above its weight" in espionage operations, according to The Economist.

== Recruiting techniques ==
New recruits do research within the ministry, mostly on counterintelligence fields (which has its own five-year career academy) and also, over regular college students, who are recruited around the second year on their programs. Those students mostly study: languages, history, communications, and sociology. Once they get their diplomas, they undergo several months of official intelligence training and, a year or so after, they receive the rank of lieutenant.

== KGB and StB relationship ==
The Soviet Union's KGB and the Cuban DI had a complex relationship, marked by times of extremely close cooperation and by periods of extreme competition. The Soviet Union saw the new revolutionary government in Cuba as an excellent proxy agent in areas of the world where Soviet involvement lacked popular local-level support. Nikolai Leonov, the KGB chief in Mexico City, one of the first Soviet officials to recognize Fidel Castro's potential as a revolutionary, urged the Soviet administration to strengthen ties with the new Cuban leader. Moscow saw Cuba as having far more appeal with new revolutionary movements, western intellectuals and members of the New Left, with Cuba's perceived "David and Goliath struggle" against US imperialism.

In the early 1960s, Czechoslovak intelligence (StB) had more intensive contacts with the emerging Cuban DI than the KGB. Czechoslovaks provided Cubans with intelligence reports, spy equipment, and training. Manuel Piñeiro was in regular contact with the StB station chief in Cuba and appreciated the quality of Czechoslovak intelligence reports, that were important for sustaining the Cuban revolution in its early years. Cubans wanted to rely on the StB in building the DI and the Ministry of Interior. The Soviets soon stopped such initiatives.

Between 1962 and 1969, Czechoslovak intelligence cooperated with the DI on the top secret Operation Manuel, moving 1,179 Latin American revolutionaries via Prague back to Latin America. Czechoslovak intelligence helped DI to falsify the passports of Latin Americans who trained in Cuba, to become guerrillas.

Shortly after the Cuban Missile Crisis of 1962, Moscow invited 1,500 DI agents, including Che Guevara, to the KGB's Moscow Center for intensive training in intelligence operations.

Dismayed by Cuban debacles in Zaire (1977 and 1978) and in Bolivia (1966–1967), and by a perceived growing independence from Moscow, the Soviets sought a more active role in shaping the DI. In 1970, a team of KGB advisers, led by Gen. Viktor Semyonov, was sent to the DI to purge it of officers and agents considered anti-Soviet by the KGB. Manuel Piñeiro, becoming increasingly upset at the co-option of the DI by the Soviets, was removed, during the 1970 purge, and replaced with the pro-Soviet José Méndez Cominches as the head of the DI.

Semyonov also took this opportunity to oversee a rapid expansion of the DI's "western" operations. In 1971, 70% of the Cuban diplomats in London were actually DI agents and proved invaluable to Moscow, after the British government's mass expulsion of Soviet intelligence officers.

In 1962, the Soviet Union opened its largest foreign SIGINT site in Lourdes, Cuba, approximately 25 kilometres (16 mi) from Havana. The Intelligence Resource Program of the Federation of American Scientists stated, in 2001, that the Lourdes facility covered a 28 square-mile (73 km^{2}) area, with 1,000 to 1,500 Soviet and, later, solely Russian engineers, technicians and military personnel working at the base. Those familiar with the Lourdes facility confirmed that the base has multiple groups of tracking dishes and its own satellite system. Some groups intercept telephone calls, faxes and computer communications, and other groups cover targeted telephones and devices. In 2001, the Russian President, Vladimir Putin, announced that the facility would be shut down.

The Soviets also collaborated with the DI to assist Central Intelligence Agency defector Philip Agee in the publication of the Covert Action Information Bulletin.

== Operations abroad ==
Throughout its 40-year history, the DI has been actively involved in aiding leftist movements, primarily in Latin America, Africa, and the Middle East.

There have been allegations that Cuban DI agents interrogated US prisoners of war (POWs) held at the Cu Loc POW camp in North Vietnam.

The DI allegedly infiltrated the CIA through double agent Mauro Casagrandi.

=== Chile ===
Shortly after the election of Salvador Allende as president of Chile in November 1970, the DI worked extremely closely to strengthen Allende's increasingly precarious position. The Cuban DI station chief Luis Fernández Oña married Allende's daughter, Beatriz, who later committed suicide in Cuba.

=== Grenada ===
Shortly after a bloodless coup in Grenada, led by Maurice Bishop, the Cuban DI sent advisers to the island nation to assist the new government. The DI was also instrumental in persuading the Soviet Union to aid Grenada, aid that the Grenadian general Hudson Austin called essential to the success of the Caribbean anti-imperialist movement. The DI coordinated 780 Cuban engineers and intelligence operatives.

=== Nicaragua ===
Beginning in 1967, the DI had begun to establish ties with various Nicaraguan revolutionary organizations. The Soviets were upset at what they saw as Cuba upstaging the KGB in Nicaragua. By 1970, the DI had managed to train hundreds of Sandinista guerrilla leaders and had vast influence over the organization. In 1969, the DI had financed and organized an operation to free the jailed Sandinistan leader, Carlos Fonseca, from his prison in Costa Rica. Fonseca was captured shortly after the jail break, but after a plane carrying executives from the United Fruit Company was hijacked by the Sandinista National Liberation Front (FSLN), he was freed and allowed to travel to Cuba.

DI chief Manuel Piñeiro commented that "of all the countries in Latin America, the most active work being carried out by us is in Nicaragua".

The DI, with Fidel Castro's personal blessing, also collaborated with the FSLN on the botched assassination attempt of Turner B. Shelton, the US ambassador in Managua and a close friend to the Somoza family. The FSLN managed to secure several hostages, exchanging them for safe passage to Cuba and a $1 million ransom. After the successful ousting of Anastasio Somoza, DI involvement in the new Sandinista government expanded rapidly. An early indication of the central role that the DI would play in the Cuban–Nicaraguan relationship was a meeting in Havana on 27 July 1979, at which diplomatic ties between the two countries were re-established after over 25 years. Julián López Díaz, a prominent DI agent, was named ambassador to Nicaragua.

Cuban military and DI advisers initially brought in, during the Sandinistan insurgency, would swell to over 2,500 and operated at all levels of the new Nicaraguan government. Sandinista defector Álvaro Baldizón confirmed that Cuban influence in Nicaragua's Interior Ministry (MINT) was more extensive than was widely believed at the time, and Cuban "advice" and "observations" were treated as though they were orders.

=== Puerto Rico ===
The DI sought to aid the growing Puerto Rican separatist movement. Dr. Daniel James testified before a US Senate subcommittee that the DGI, working through Filiberto Ojeda Ríos, organized and trained the Fuerzas Armadas de Liberación Nacional Puertorriqueña (FALN) in 1974.

In October 1974, Ojeda Ríos was arrested and charged with terrorist acts against American hotels in Puerto Rico. Authorities found a substantial amount of Cuban government documents and secret codes in his possession. Shortly after his release on bail, he disappeared, but was credited with the 1979 unification of Puerto Rico's five principal terrorist groups into the Cuban-directed National Revolutionary Command (CRN). According to the former chief investigator of the US Senate, Alfonso Tarabochia, the DGI began directing criminal activities in Puerto Rico and the eastern and midwestern United States, as early as 1974. That June, the secretary general of the Puerto Rican Socialist Party, Juan Marí Bras, met in Havana with Fidel Castro, to consolidate party solidarity.

Beginning in September 1974, the incidence of bombings by Puerto Rican extremists, particularly the FALN, escalated sharply. Targets included US companies and public places. The FALN was responsible for a bombing that killed four and wounded dozens at the historic Fraunces Tavern in lower Manhattan on January 25, 1975. Later that year, Fidel Castro sponsored the First World Solidarity Conference for the Independence of Puerto Rico in Havana.

Ojeda Ríos was killed by the FBI on Friday, 23 September 2005, in the town of Hormigueros, Puerto Rico.

== Camp Matanzas ==
Camp Matanzas is a training facility operated by the DI and is located outside Havana, since early 1962. It has hosted the likes of Carlos the Jackal.

== Leadership ==
- Manuel "Redbeard" Piñeiro (1961-1964)
- Eduardo Delgado Rodríguez
