= Encyclopedia of Afghan Jihad =

Arabic encyclopedia

The Encyclopedia of the Afghan Jihad
- Original title: موسوعة الجهاد الأفغاني
- Language: Arabic
- Genre: Reference work
- Publication place: Pakistan
- Pages: 8,000+

The Encyclopedia of the Afghan Jihad (Arabic: موسوعة الجهاد الأفغاني, tr: Mawsuat al-Jihad al-Afghani) is a multivolume encyclopedia describing diverse weapons in Arabic. It was first published in Pakistan in late 1992 or early 1993. The encyclopedia consists of more than 8,000 pages—an abridged version has been reduced to approximately 1,000 pages—and has been divided into 11 volumes.

An electronic version of the original, full-length encyclopedia was discovered in the possession of a group of Muslim militants in Belgium in the 1990s. Since then, several copies have been found; one was found in the possession of Abu Hamza al-Masri, a Muslim cleric who controlled the Finsbury Park Mosque in London, and another was recovered from Osama bin Laden's headquarters in Kandahar.

== Outline ==
The first volume deals with explosives, the second with first aid, and the last volume teaches the use of small arms, including anti-aircraft guns, anti-tank arms, and artillery. such as:

1. Explosives
2. First aid
3. Pistols, revolvers
4. Bombs, mines
5. Security intelligence
6. Tactics practiced
7. Weapons
8. Tanks
9. Close fighting
10. Topography area survey
11. Armament
