= List of fictional double agents =

Double agents have appeared many times in fiction. This list also includes reverse agents, triple agents, and quadruple agents.

== Film ==
- Riley Hicks (Fast & Furious 6) - Initially introduced as an ally of Luke Hobbs, Hicks is later revealed to be a mole working for Owen Shaw.
- Martin Walker (White House Down) - A member of the Secret Service who assists in an attack on the White House.
- Joanna Worth (G20) - The Secretary of the Treasury, who conspires with Edward Rutledge to attack the President.

== Television ==
- Nicholas Brody (Homeland) - A sergeant who enters Congress to influence the U.S. military.
- Double Trouble (She-Ra and the Princesses of Power) - A shapeshifting mercenary who aids both She-Ra's rebellion and Hordak's forces.
- John Garrett (Agents of S.H.I.E.L.D.) - Introduced as a member of S.H.I.E.L.D., Garrett is later revealed to be a Hydra sleeper agent known as the Clairvoyant.
- Kaldur'ahm/Aqualad (Young Justice) - A member of the eponymous team who infiltrates the Light to gather information.
- Syril Karn (Andor) - A member of the Imperial Bureau of Standards who infiltrates the Ghorman Front resistance group at the arrangement of his partner and Imperial Security Bureau Supervisor Dedra Meero.
- Alex Krycek (The X-Files) - Introduced as an ally of Fox Mulder, Krycek is later revealed to be working for the Smoking Man.
- Lauren Reed (Alias) - Introduced as a member of the National Security Council, Reed is later revealed to be a double agent for the Covenant.
- Rose (American Dragon: Jake Long) - Rose is initially a member of the Huntsclan, a cult that hunts magical creatures. However, she betrays the group after falling in love with Jake Long.
- Grant Ward (Agents of S.H.I.E.L.D.) - Introduced as a member of S.H.I.E.L.D., Ward is later revealed to be a double agent for Hydra.

== Literature ==
- Captain America (Marvel Comics) - During the "Secret Empire" storyline, Kobik rewrites Captain America's history, making him a sleeper agent for Hydra.
- Terra (DC Comics) - Terra is a princess from Markovia who possesses the ability to manipulate the earth. She infiltrates the Teen Titans on Deathstroke's behalf during the "Judas Contract" storyline.

== Video games ==
- Axel (Kingdom Hearts) - A member of Organization XIII who works against the group to stop Marluxia and Larxene from overthrowing its leadership while having motives of his own.
- Paul Denton (Deus Ex) - Initially a member of the anti-terrorist group UNATCO, Denton later defects to the terrorist group NSF, acting as a mole on their behalf.
- Revolver Ocelot (Metal Gear) - Initially appearing as a member of the terrorist group FOXHOUND, Ocelot allies with various groups throughout his appearances, including the Philosophers, the KGB, and the CIA.
- Wei Shen (Sleeping Dogs) - A police officer who infiltrates the Sun On Yee triad to destroy it.
