= Harun Hashim Rashid =

Palestinian poet and educator from the Gaza Strip

- Born: 1927; Al-Shati refugee camp, Palestine
- Died: May 16, 2024 (aged 96–97)
- Occupations: Poet, librarian

Harun Hashim Rashid (Arabic: هارون هاشم رشيد; 1927 – 27 July 2020) was a Palestinian poet and librarian from the Gaza Strip.

== Early life ==
Harun Hashim Rashid was born in 1927 in the Gaza Strip. When he was a child, British soldiers destroy his and his neighbors' homes. He graduated in Higher Teacher Training Diploma from the Gaza College. He worked as a teacher until 1954. He then became director of Sawt al-Arab broadcasting station in the district of Gaza. following the fall of Gaza to the Israelis in 1967, he was eventually compelled to leave the region. He worked in Cairo, as representative of Palestine at the League of Arab States.

== Works ==
He wrote nearly twenty poetry collections, including "strangers" in 1954, "The Return of Strangers" in 1956, "Gaza in the Line of Fire", and "Until our people return" 1965, "Ship of Wrath" 1968, and "The Storm Journey" 1969, "Fedayeen" 1970, "Lover's Notebook" 1980, "Diaries of Resilience and Sadness" 1983, "Stone Revolution" 1991, "Birds of Paradise" 1998, "Returnees" and others. Rashid also wrote four poetry plays, in which he starred on the stage in Cairo, "The Question", starring Karam Mutawa and Suhair Al Morshidi. After the Yom Kippur War, he wrote the play "The Fall of Barlev" and was presented on the National Theater in Cairo in 1974, and the play "Birds of Thorns". He has also written a novel, Years of the Suffering (1971), and several studies on poetry and politics.

On September 5, 1964, Malcolm X traveled to Gaza. This city was under the control of Egypt. He visited Harun Hashim Rashid. In this conversation, Malcolm was visibly moved by the latter's horrific experience and recounting of the Suez Crisis nearly a decade earlier, in which hundreds of Palestinians were murdered by the IDF.
