= Terrorist training camp =

Faculty to train terrorists

A terrorist training camp is a facility established to train individuals in the ways of terrorism. By teaching them the methods and tactics of terrorism, those conducting such facilities aim to create an "army" of individuals who will do their bidding. They are often located in, but not confined to, regions where it is intended that acts of terrorism will be carried out, or in traditional areas of extremism, such as Pakistan, Afghanistan, Iraq, Syria and Somalia. Wide-open spaces such as parks and wilderness areas are common sites for these camps.

Despite the destruction of many jihadist training facilities, numerous camps are known to still exist. Terrorist groups like the Islamic State in Iraq and the Levant (ISIL) and the Al Nusra Front (ANF) continue to provide these facilities. Camps usually include basic physical fitness training, progression to weapons training and armed assault techniques and potentially instruction in bomb making. Individuals in these camps will also be given guidance to help them avoid coming to the attention of the authorities, and on communicating securely. In most cases, these camps take place in parts of the world which lack stable government oversight, such as Syria, Iraq and Somalia. Spending time there will involve physical hardship and danger. The trainee will have to satisfy those providing the training of their commitment and loyalty.

== Locations ==
Abu Isa training camp is an ISIL training camp located in Ninewa whose trainer was identified as Jundullah al-Azeri.

Abu Hamza al-Masri was indicted in a conspiracy to attempt to establish a "terrorist training camp" in late 1999 and early 2000 with Taliban supporter Earnest James Ujaama who traveled to Bly, Oregon, with a dozen men from his Seattle house of worship. Ujaama is a US citizen who had met Abu Hamza in England in 1999 and was indicted in the US for providing aid to al-Qaeda, attempting to establish a terrorist training camp, and for running a website advocating global jihad. The FBI has confirmed some reports Jamaat ul-Fuqra, headquartered in Islamberg, New York, was training members in isolated communes across the United States and Canada.

In Amalia, New Mexico in the United States of America, in the summer of 2018 on a remote site with a small camping trailer within a surrounding wall of car tires, 5 adults, 11 hungry children (ages 1 to 15), and later a dead child, were found. Court documents stated the children had been trained for shootings at schools. Federal terrorism, kidnapping, and firearms charges were brought against five adults in March 2019.

During the Troubles (1969 to 1998), the Republic of Ireland was used by the Provisional Irish Republican Army for training camps where they manufactured homemade weapons and recruited hundreds or thousands of Southern Irish citizens as IRA volunteers for cross-border attacks in Northern Ireland and England. This safe haven in the Republic primarily contributed to the longevity of the conflict. The IRA Southern Command was headquartered in Dublin during the conflict and handled the training camps, recruiting, financing, safe houses, and weapons procurement in the Republic or overseas to support IRA Northern Command operations in Northern Ireland. On 30 November 1981, Irish security forces discovered the IRA training camp in West Donegal and had "so far uncovered 10 rifles, a shotgun, 4,000 rounds of ammunition, uniforms and IRA training manuals."

== Purpose ==
These encampments provide recruits with weapons training, protocol training, interaction with skilled veterans, and a secure geographic location for operations. Recruits are regularly indoctrinated in the goals and beliefs of the organization. Organizational leaders attempt to isolate recruits from their outside social connections and force them to establish a new identity. This allows the organization to become the “family” of the recruit and generate loyalty to the organization's goals.

== Psychological traits ==
Depending on the type of organization, the religion and “strength of faith” of the recruit is often an indicator of their status within the organization. Those who are not willing to comply, even after completion of training, are often punished and undergo training to strengthen their observance. Terrorist recruits are tested on knowledge of their religion and of rival groups. Recruiters do this to verify that each recruit has the necessary beliefs, which ensures organizational unification. Religious verification ensures that each member is working towards mutual goals.

Recruiters use techniques that exploit or create mental trauma in order to produce a dissociated mindset in recruits — a condition in which the identity and awareness of the recruit is reset. Typical recruits look to join terrorist organizations because they are angry, alienated and/or disenfranchised. Common thought processes include: believing that their current political involvement does not give them the power to effect change; identifying with perceived victims of the perceived social injustice they are fighting; feeling the need to take action; believing that violence is not immoral; having friends or family sympathetic to the cause; and craving social and psychological rewards such as adventure, camaraderie, and a heightened sense of identity. Internet and cyber-skills are sought after as technically knowledgeable recruits can help the organization.

== Examples of physical demands ==
Many terrorist organizations train recruits in guerrilla warfare. Recruits must be in shape in order to learn these tactics. An ISIS workout video shows that cardiovascular fitness is important. Recruits often train in full uniform, with weapons in hand. Recruits need to be able to survive in their environment with little nourishment. Recruits learn that if success is not attained, they will not be rescued.

Abu Isa training camp is an ISIL training camp located in Ninewa whose trainer was identified as Jundullah al-Azeri.

== See also ==
- Afghan training camp
