= Seattle Vocational Institute =

Coordinates: 47°36′00″N 122°18′14″W

- Former name: Washington Institute of Applied Technology
- Type: Vocational-technical school
- Established: 1987
- Dean: Maureen Shadair
- Location: Seattle, Washington, United States
- Website: svi.seattlecolleges.edu

The Seattle Vocational Institute was a constituent institution of Seattle Central College, a public community college in Seattle, Washington. It was founded as the Washington Institute of Applied Technology in 1987 and took its name in 1991. It was located in the Central District and closed permanently in 2018.

== Academics ==
Seattle Vocational Institute’s instructional programs were structured into five major divisions, each with its own recognized certifications: Basic and Transitional Studies, Allied Health, Business Computers, Cosmetology, and Pre-Apprenticeship Construction Training.

=== Basic and Transitional Studies ===
SVI offered Adult Basic Education, GED preparation, English for non-native speakers, Adult Basic Education courses to improve reading, writing, grammar and math skills, and programs geared for high school students, including Bright Future which was the running start program at SVI.

=== Allied Health ===
SVI's Allied Health programs included Dental Assistant, Medical Assistant, Medical Administrative Assistant and Phlebotomy

=== Business Computers ===
SVI's Business Computer program offered a certificate in Computer Support Technician, and has offered certificated programs in Administrative Office Professional and Foundation: Office Clerk.

== Student demographics ==
As a former open-access institution, SVI admitted all persons, provided they were 18 years of age or older. If under 18, prospective students must have had graduated from high school, or submit proof of GED completion if they were 16 or 17 years old. High school students without a diploma could have taken classes at SVI in the Bright Future program.

== Accreditation ==
The Seattle Colleges District comprises public state-supported institutions, individually accredited by the Northwest Commission on Colleges and Universities. This is an institutional accrediting body recognized by the Council for Higher Education Accreditation and the United States Department of Education. Seattle Vocational Institute was accredited jointly with Seattle Central College.

Additionally, the following programs are accredited individually (year denotes first accreditation):

- Dental Assistant (2002) – Commission on Dental Accreditation of the American Dental Association
- Medical Assistant – Commission on Accreditation of Allied Health Education Programs
