= Haroon Moghul =

- Born: 1980 (age 45–46); Massachusetts
- Occupations: Academic, commentator
- Website: haroonmoghul.com

Haroon Moghul is a Pakistani-American author and commentator. He is the author of several books, including How to be a Muslim: An American Story (2017) and the upcoming Two Billion Caliphs: A Vision of a Muslim Future (2022).

His essays and articles have been published by numerous websites including The New York Times, CNN, The Washington Post, NPR's Fresh Air, Religion Dispatches, TIME, Foreign Policy, Guardian and Al Jazeera English. He has been a guest on CNN, MSNBC, Fox News, the BBC, The History Channel, NPR, and Al Jazeera English.

== Personal life ==
Moghul was born and raised in a Pakistani Punjabi family in New England. His father, Sabir Moghul, is a retired orthopedic surgeon and his late mother was a primary care physician. Both his parents were immigrants to the United States from the Islamic Republic of Pakistan. His father's roots are in Rawalpindi and his mother's roots were in East Punjab. He has one older brother, an attorney.

== Works ==
- 2003 My First Police State
- 2006 The Order of Light
- 2014 "Prom, InshAllah," in Salaam, Love: American Muslim Men on Love, Sex, and Intimacy
- 2017 How to Be a Muslim: An American Story
- 2022 Two Billion Caliphs: A Vision of a Muslim Future
