= Haroon Yousofi =

Haroon Yousofi (Persian: هارون یوسفی) is an Afghan journalist, poet and satirist living in London.

He studied Persian literature at Kabul University and later Russian literature in Moscow State University. After returning from Russia in 1976, he taught literature at Kabul University until 1990 when he migrated to Great Britain.

As a Producer at the BBC World Service Persian from 1990 until 2010, he created and hosted a number of successful arts and cultural shows including Studio 7 and Rainbow.

He has received numerous awards internationally, including the 2012 Poet of the Year Award from the Afghan Writers and Poets Association in Netherlands. Hay (Persian: هی), a collection of his latest poems, was published in 2019.

He hosts and appears on various Afghan television, radio and internet shows. In his live online weekly show, Studio 19 (created during the COVID-19 lock down) he interviews famous Afghan celebrities.
