= Haroun Touny =

Egyptian water polo player (born 1947)

Personal information
- Nationality: Egyptian
- Born: 17 October 1947 (age 77); Cairo, Egypt

Sport
- Sport: Water polo

Haroun Touny (born 17 October 1947) is an Egyptian water polo player. He competed in the men's tournament at the 1968 Summer Olympics.
