= M Harunur Rashid (archaeologist) =

Archaeologist

- এম হারুনুর রশিদ
- Born: 1925; Rasulullahbad Village, Brahmanbaria District, Bengal, British India
- Died: 10 October 2010; Dhaka, Bangladesh
- Education: PhD (Archaeology)
- Alma mater: Dhaka College; University of Dhaka; Cambridge University

M Harunur Rashid (1925 – 10 October 2010) was a Bangladeshi archaeologist, educationist, and museum curator who excavated archaeological sites in Pakistan and Bangladesh.

== Education ==
Rashid passed the matriculation in 1940 from Abu Torab High School in Chittagong and then passed IA in 1942 from Dhaka College. He obtained a Bachelor of Arts (Honors) in 1945 and a Master of Arts in history in 1946 from the University of Dhaka. He earned his PhD from Cambridge University in 1968.

== Career ==
Rashid joined Bhairab College as a lecturer in history, and then he moved to join the Archaeology of Pakistan. He worked as a curator at the Lahore Museum and later joined the Taxila Museum. Along with British archaeologist Mortimer Wheeler, he excavated Banbhore, Taxila, Harappa, Mohenjo-daro, and many other sites in Pakistan. These excavations, along with "...the principal finds of all classes formed the necessary foundation..." of early South-East Bengal history between the 6th and 13th centuries A.D.

After 1971, Rashid started working as a senior official in the Directorate of Archaeology until 1982. He also compiled and edited the volume on Bangladesh archaeology in 1979.

He worked as a visiting professor at the Department of History, Jahangirnagar University in Savar. He also taught at the Institute of Fine Arts and the History Department of the University of Dhaka.
