= Mauro Casagrandi =

Italian businessman

- Born: 1940; Rome, Italy
- Died: November 2025 (aged 84–85); Havana, Cuba
- Other name: Mario
- Occupation: Businessman
- Known for: Cuban intelligence activities
- Espionage activity
- Allegiance: Cuba

Mauro Casagrandi (Rome, 1940 - Havana, 2025) was an Italian businessman based in Havana, Cuba. Under the nickname Mario he was a Cuban intelligence agent.

== Career ==
With a right-wing Italian diplomat as a father, he lived in Rome and other cities (Madrid, Barcellona) during his young time. He moved to Cuba in 1966 shortly after the 1959 Cuban Revolution, as the representation of COMEI, Compagnia Mercantile Internazionale, an Italian trading company representing among others FIAT and Olivetti. In 1982, he became a knight of the Sovereign Military Order of Malta, he became the Order's Ambassador to Cuba.

During his overseas travels, he was allegedly approached by the Central Intelligence Agency, who hoped to use him to gather insider information about Fidel Castro's Cuba. He accepted the offer in Spain in 1975, but intending instead to benefit the Cuban government, which he supported. He therefore became a double agent of the Cuban regime.

In 1987, he was honored by the Cuban government for managing to infiltrate the CIA. He received the medal of the order of solidarity from President Fidel Castro and Vice President Raul Castro for his service.

In the 1990s however, he started becoming disillusioned with the Cuban ideology. Many observers believe that he was related to the leak of the classified documents related to the purge of the Centro de Estudios Sobre América.

Casagrandi died in November 2025.
