= Haruna Mawa =

Ugandan footballer and coach

Personal information
- Place of birth: Uganda

Senior career*
Years	Team	Apps	(Gls)
- Rayon Sports

Managerial career
- –2016: SC Victoria University
- 2016–2017: Somalia
- * Club domestic league appearances and goals

Haruna Mawa is a Ugandan football coach and former footballer. As a player, he played for Rayon Sports in Rwanda. In November 2016, he was appointed as coach of the Somalia national football team.
