= Mutt, Virginia =

Unincorporated community in Virginia, United States

- Unincorporated community
- Location within Virginia and the United States Mutt (the United States)
- Coordinates: 37°11′24″N 78°10′19″W
- Country: United States
- State: Virginia
- County: Nottoway
- Elevation: 505 ft (154 m)
- Time zone: UTC-5 (Eastern (EST))
  - Summer (DST): UTC-4 (EDT)
- GNIS ID: 1493332

Mutt is an unincorporated community in Nottoway County, Virginia, United States.
