= Harun Hassan =

Kenyan disability advocate

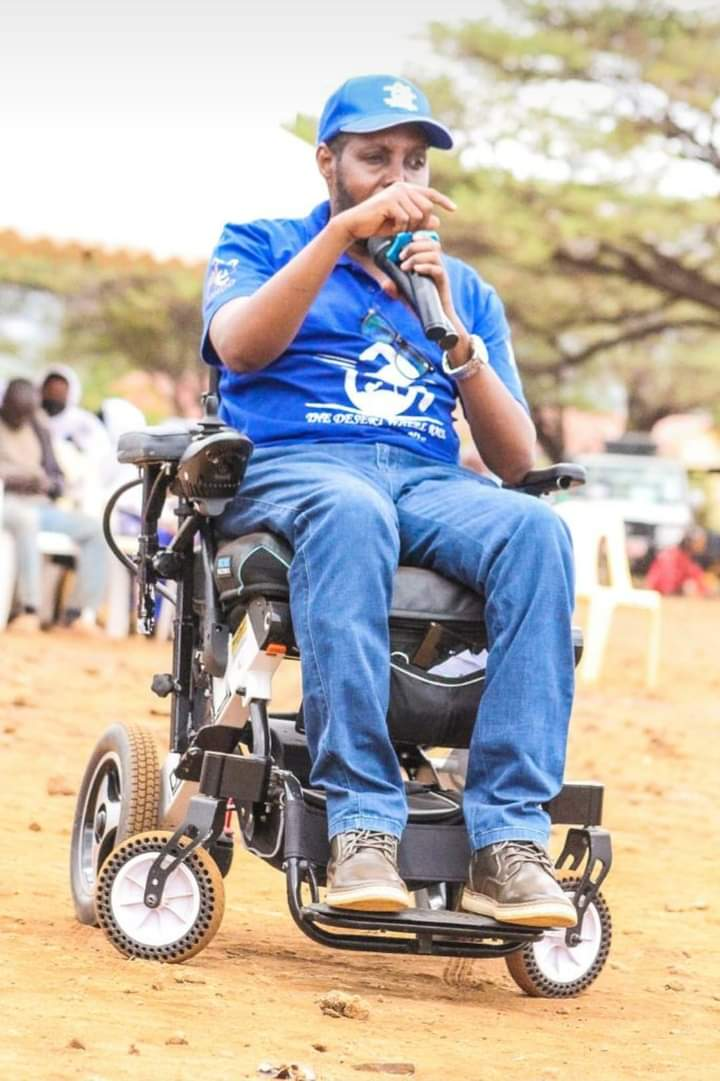
Harun Hassan at a past event

Harun Maalim Hassan was born in 1978 in Dandu location, Mandera County in Kenya. He is a disability rights activist and ambassador. He is currently a Commissioner at the Public Service Commission, following his appointment by his Excellency the President Dr. William Ruto. He is also a former Chief Executive Officer of the National Council for Persons with Disabilities. He previously served as the founder and CEO of the Northern Nomadic Disabled Persons Organisation (NONDO) from 2014 to 2020. He has also been vocal in advocating for the rights of persons with disabilities.

== Career and Disability ==
Harun served as District officer on the Office of the President of Kenya. On March 23, 2007, Harun was involved in a road crash that almost cost him his life. He was admitted at Nairobi Hospital high dependency unit for four months, where the medics informed him that the injuries sustained meant he would never walk again. For seven months, he underwent rehabilitation at the National Spinal Injury Referral Hospital.

== Disability advocacy ==
This experience led him to found the Northern Nomadic Disabled Persons Organization (NONDO), Kenya's first disability non-governmental organization focused on persons with disabilities living in the arid northern parts of Kenya. The organization is famous for its desert wheel race in Kenya, where wheelchair users in arid and nomadic areas of Kenya engage in a race in a bid to raise awareness on disability through the use of sports. The race has gained national and regional acknowledgment. Others areas Harun has been vocal through the desert wheel race has been messaging peace and unity in the run-up to the 2017 Kenyan General Election. Harun has been on record pushing for disability inclusion in various aspects of the Kenyan society, which include pushing for persons with disabilities to receive government tenders on a priority basis as the other vulnerable and special groups. In 2019, he captured international media attention after reportedly being denied a flight in Ethiopian Airlines because he was a wheelchair user. Harun is also an author, having published Behind the Wheels: Transforming the Narrative a story of his life as a person with disability and a disability activist. In 2023, he was also awarded the Elder of the Order of the Burning Spear (EBS) by the President of Kenya for his distinguished service.
