= Haroun (comedian) =

French humorist (born 1984)

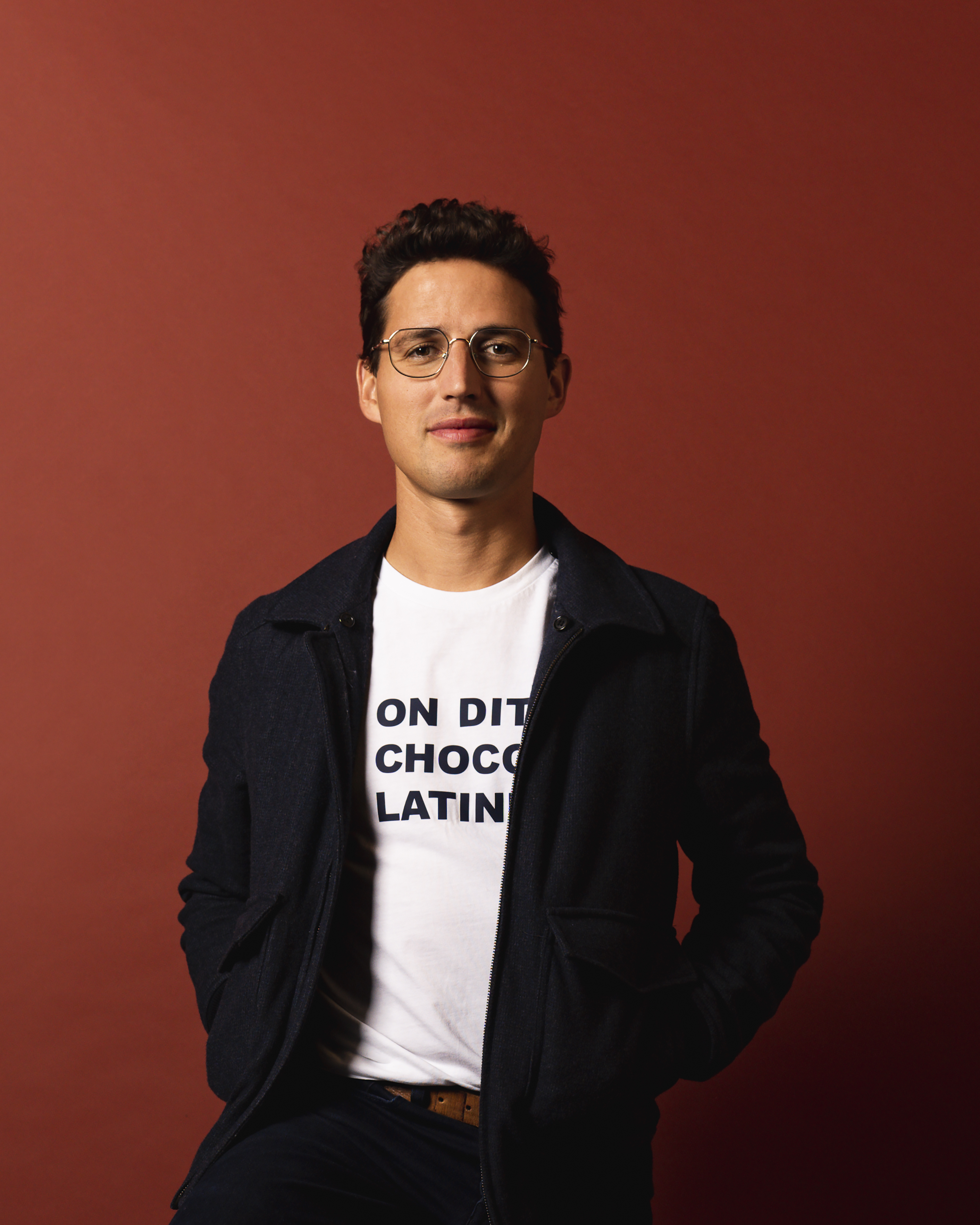
- Haroun in 2020
- Born: July 11 1984

Comedy career
- Medium: Stand-up
- Subjects: Observational comedy, surreal humor, black comedy
- Website: www.haroun.fr

Haroun (born 1984 in Les Lilas) is a French comedian and actor.

Haroun grew up in Bures-sur-Yvette, Essonne, southwest of Paris. His comedy has been described as being surreal, tongue-in-cheek, and containing dark humor. Much of his work focuses on controversial issues such as religions, sexual harassment, and nuclear weapons. For this reason, he also prefers to avoid mentioning personal information about his early life in public. He is considered a rising star in French stand-up comedy.

== Biography ==
Haroun was born in 1984 in Seine-Saint-Denis and grew up in Bures-sur-Yvette. Passionate about hip-hop dance and improvisation, he studied at a business school. At the same time, he wrote a one-man show. He traveled around the world with his wife[4], then trained in theatrical improvisation for businesses in Toulouse. He wrote a second one-man show and then devoted himself exclusively to his career as a comedian.

In 2019, he launched the website “Pasquinade” to showcase his shows and humorous content. He transposed the principle of the hat into the Pay what you want to bring content creators and audiences closer together.

In 2020, he published a book entitled Les Pensées d'Héractète (The Thoughts of Heraclitus) with Éditions des Équateurs, in which he desacralizes philosophy by inventing an Ancient Greek philosophy with thoughts and aphorisms.
