= Dubai initiative =

The Dubai Initiative (DI) was a joint venture between the Dubai School of Government (DSG) and Harvard Kennedy School at Harvard University. Established in 2004, it was based at the Kennedy School's Belfer Center for Science and International Affairs. The Dubai Initiative was closed on 31 December 2011.

DI ran an annual fellowship program for doctoral candidates, post-docs, and practitioners in policy-relevant fields related to the Middle East. It had an internship program for students and sponsors research by faculty, students, and scholars on the Middle East. DI held an annual conference and public events aimed at generating ideas and debate on relevant policy issues.
