= Harun Mut =

Turkish para-alpine skier (born 2000)

Personal information
- National team: Turkey
- Born: 2000 (age 25–26)
- Home town: Kayseri, Turkey
- Education: Sports (swimming); Erciyes University

Sport
- Country: Turkey
- Sport: Para-alpine skiing, amputee football
- Disability class: LW2 (Para-alpine skiing)
- Club: Depsaş Enerji S.C.

Harun Mut (born 2000) is a Turkish para-alpine skier who competes in the LW2 disability class, and an amputee football player.

== Personal life ==
Harun Mut was born in 2000. He lives in Kayseri, Turkey.

Mut lost his left leg due to gangrene at his age of seven.

He studied Sports at Erciyes University in Kayseri, and graduated with a degree in swimming.

== Sport career ==
Motivated by the national amputee football player Feyyaz Gözaçık, Mut first started to play amputee football in 2013. In 2018, he switched over to para-alpine skiing, motivated again by Gözaçık, who performed also para-alpine skiing. Mut has also interest in performing wheelchair basketball and para swimming. For alpine skiing, he trains at Erciyes Ski Resort.

Officially tepresenting Turkey, Mut took part at the 2025 World Para Alpine Skiing Championships held in Maribor Pohorje Ski Resort, Slovenia. He competed in the LW2 disability class of the men's giant slalom, and > slalom events.

He is one of the three Turkish para-alpine skiers living in Turkey, the others are Feyyaz Gözaçık and Ömer Yıldırım. Two expatriate Turkish para-alpine skiers live in the USA and in France. Mut is the only national team member, and the first Turkish portsman, who competed at world championships.

Mut is a member of Depsaş Enerji Sports Club.
