= Haroon Rasheed (Punjab cricketer) =

Pakistani cricketer (1962–2021)

Personal information
- Full name: Haroon Rasheed
- Born: 3 July 1962; Lahore, Punjab, Pakistan
- Died: 8 February 2021 (aged 58); Lahore, Punjab, Pakistan
- Batting: Right-handed
- Bowling: Leg break googly
- Role: Bowler

Domestic team information
- Years: Team
- Lahore
- Pakistan Railways

Career statistics
Competition	First-class	List A
Matches	32	2
Runs scored	401	32
Batting average	11.45	32.00
100s/50s	0/1	0/0
Top score	51	28*
Balls bowled	3,999	66
Wickets	61	2
Bowling average	38.44	30.00
5 wickets in innings	3	0
10 wickets in match	0	0
Best bowling	5/54	2/43
Catches/stumpings	9/–	0/–
- Source: Cricinfo, 1 May 2026

Haroon Rasheed (3 July 1962 – 8 February 2021) was a Pakistani cricketer. Rasheed was a right-handed batsman who bowled leg break googly. He was born in Lahore, Punjab, and played domestic cricket in Pakistan for Lahore and Pakistan Railways.

Rasheed was educated at Government Arif High School and later at Islamia College, Civil Lines, Lahore. While playing college cricket, he scored a century in an inter-collegiate final as Islamia College completed a chase in excess of 400 runs. He later represented Lahore City A in the 1980–81 National Under-19 Championship and impressed sufficiently to earn his first-class debut for Lahore City in the Quaid-e-Azam Trophy.

A few months after his first-class debut, Rasheed took 6 for 56 for BCCP Patron's XI against the touring Australia Under-19 side at Pindi Club Ground. He then claimed seven wickets in the second youth "Mini Test" at Hyderabad, helping Pakistan Under-19 to an innings victory.

Rasheed's first five-wicket haul in first-class cricket came for Lahore City against Zone C in the 1985–86 Quaid-e-Azam Trophy. In the following season, captaining Lahore City Whites in the 1986–87 BCCP President's Cup, he recorded his career-best bowling figures of 5 for 54 against Public Works Department at the Lahore City Cricket Association Ground. He followed that with figures of 5 for 115 against ADBP at Railways Stadium, Lahore.

His only first-class fifty came in the 1987–88 Quaid-e-Azam Trophy, when he scored 51 batting at number ten against HBFC at Bagh-e-Jinnah, Lahore.

After his first-class career, Rasheed continued to play club cricket with Shining Cricket Club and briefly represented Servis Industries. He later worked as a coach at Garrison School, Lahore, at Shafqat Rana Academy, and eventually at Aitchison College, Lahore.

Rasheed died in Lahore on 8 February 2021, aged 58.
