= Haroon Rashid (chemist) =

Vice-Chancellor at University of Peshawar

- Occupation: Professor, Teaching, Research & Management
- Education: PhD
- Alma mater: University of Peshawar, University of the Pacific (United States), University of Missouri

Website
- upesh.edu.pk

Haroon Rashid is an academic in chemistry and is Vice-Chancellor at the University of Peshawar.

He has published 22 research papers in international journals and secured research funds of over 52 million PKR of which provided for the establishment of a Nuclear Medicine Research Laboratory at the University of Peshawar. He is on the editorial board of the Journal of the Chemical Society of Pakistan and previously served as the chief editor of the Journal of Science and Technology at the University of Peshawar.
