= Haroon Khan (senator, in office 2006–2012) =

Pakistani politician

Senator of Pakistan
- In office March 2006 – March 2012
- Constituency: Punjab

Personal details
- Political party: Pakistan Muslim League (PML)
- Profession: Politician

Haroon Khan is a Pakistani politician who served as a senator from March 2006 to March 2012. He represented the province of Punjab and was a member of the Pakistan Muslim League (PML).
