= Mutts (band) =

American rock band

Mutts is an American rock band from Chicago, Illinois.

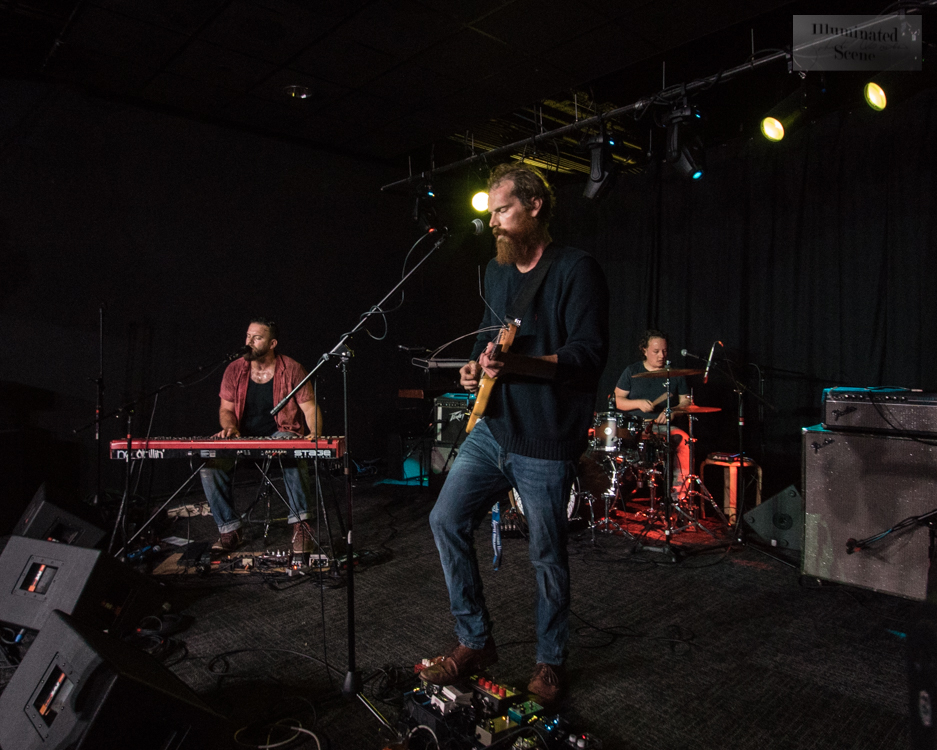

== Career ==
Mutts formed in 2009 with Mike Maimone and Bob Buckstaff after the two met as touring members of Company of Thieves and bonded over a love of Tom Waits. They recorded and toured with several drummers until 2011, when Chris Pagnani joined the band. The group released their first EP, We Float, in 2010 via 8eat8 Records. Mutts released their first full-length album, Pray For Rain, in 2011.

In 2012, Mutts released their second full-length album, Separation Anxiety. Mutts released their third full-length album, Object Permanence, in 2013. 2014 saw the prominent usage of "God, Country, Grave," off of Separation Anxiety, on the Cinemax series Banshee, recurring several times throughout the Season 2 premiere.

Mutts released their fourth full-length album, Fuel Yer Delusion Vol. 4, in 2014.

== Discography ==
Studio albums

- Pray For Rain (2011, Mutts Music)
- Separation Anxiety (2012, Mutts Music)
- Object Permanence (2013, Mutts Music)
- Fuel Yer Delusion Vol. 4 (2014, Mutts Music)

EPs

- We Float (2010, 8eat8 Records)
