= Abu Hamza al-Masri =

Egyptian-born British Islamist terrorist incarcerated in a US federal prison

- أبو حمزة المصري
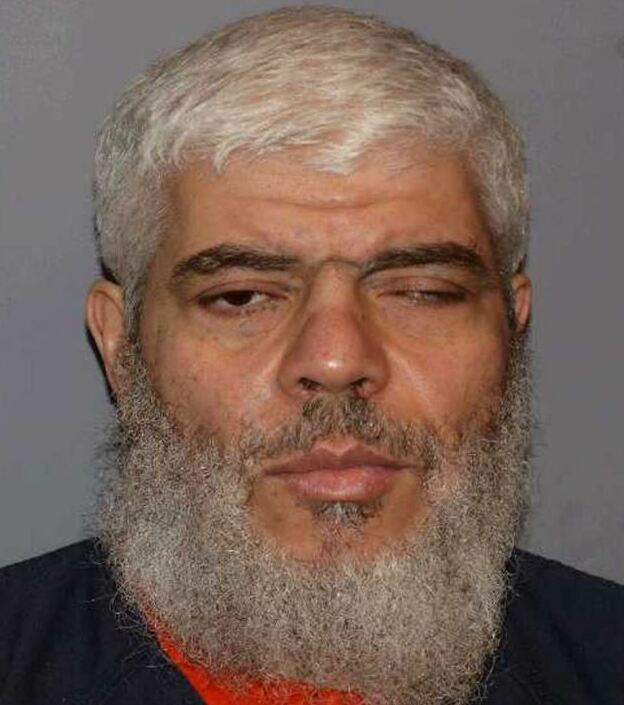
- al-Masri, shortly after his extradition to the U.S. in 2012
- Born: Mustafa Kamel Mustafa مصطفى كامل مصطفى; 15 April 1958 (age 68); Alexandria, Egypt
- Citizenship: Egyptian
- Status: Imprisoned at ADX Florence, Colorado, United States
- Convictions: United States: Hostage-taking (1 count); Providing material support to terrorists (4 counts); Conspiracy (6 counts) (Note: Conspiracy to take hostages (1 count); Conspiracy to commit an offence against the United States (1 count); Conspiracy to provide material support to terrorists (4 counts))
- Penalty: Life imprisonment without the possibility of parole

Mustafa Kamel Mustafa (Arabic: مصطفى كامل مصطفى; born 15 April 1958), also known as Abu Hamza al-Masri (/ˈɑːbuː ˈhɑːmzə ɑːl ˈmɑːsri/; أبو حمزة المصري, Abū Ḥamzah al-Maṣrī – literally, father of Hamza, the Egyptian), or simply Abu Hamza, is an Egyptian cleric who was the imam of Finsbury Park Mosque in London, where he preached Islamic fundamentalist views.

The UK tabloid press nicknamed him "Captain Hook" in allusion to the fictional pirate Captain Hook, due to his prosthetic hook devices.

In 2004, Hamza was arrested by British police after the United States requested he be extradited to face charges. He was later charged by British authorities with sixteen offences for inciting violence and racial hatred. In 2006, a British court found him guilty of inciting violence, and sentenced him to seven years' imprisonment. On 5 October 2012, after an eight-year legal battle, he was extradited from the UK to the United States to face terrorism charges and on 14 April 2014 his trial began in New York. On 19 May 2014, Hamza was found guilty of eleven terrorism charges by a jury in Manhattan. On 9 January 2015, he was sentenced to life in prison without the possibility of parole.

== Background ==
Hamza was born Mustafa Kamel Mustafa, in Alexandria, Egypt, in 1958, the son of a middle-class army officer. In 1979, he entered the UK on a student visa.

His initial reaction to life in Britain was to describe it as "a paradise, where you could do anything you wanted." He studied civil engineering at Brighton Polytechnic. Prior to his adoption of Islam in Malta, 1999, Hamza was known as a "gentle giant" and a "womaniser". Hamza gained employment as a bouncer in the strip bars of Soho under his original name from 1980 until 1983, when club owner Jean Agius was arrested and charged for conspiring to be a pimp. Agius alleges that Hamza may have also co-owned a club during this time.

Hamza, who has one eye and no hands, once claimed he lost them fighting Soviet forces in Afghanistan. CNN reported they were "injuries he says he sustained while tackling a landmine in Afghanistan."

Among several accounts that take issue with Hamza's story, BBC security correspondent Gordon Corera's introduction to Omar Nasiri's memoir Inside the Jihad: My Life with Al Qaeda says Hamza "boosted his credibility" with rumours he sustained the injuries fighting jihad; also that Nasiri knew they resulted from "an accident during experiments in a training camp", and Hamza asked Nasiri "to keep this secret in order to avoid undermining his reputation." This version of events is corroborated by Aimen Dean, a senior figure in al-Qaeda's chemical weapons programme turned double agent for MI6. Both Dean and Hamza were trained by Abu Khabab, al-Qaeda's top bomb maker. Dean states that Hamza sustained his injuries at a training camp near Lahore where, having prepared a batch of nitroglycerin, Hamza ignored his tutor's instructions to wait for the mixture to cool before inserting the detonator. During his trial in the United States, Hamza stated that his injuries occurred whilst working with explosives with the Pakistani military in Lahore.

=== Family ===
On 16 May 1980, Hamza married British citizen Valerie Fleming, a Roman Catholic convert to Islam, and soon after they had a son, Mohammed Mustafa Kamel born in October 1981. In 1984, their relationship came under increasing strain and later in that year Hamza took three-year-old Mohammed with him to Egypt, effectively breaking contact with Valerie. Eventually they divorced and he married Najat Mustafa, with whom he has seven children: five sons followed by two daughters. Hamza's stepdaughter, Donna Traverso, told The Times in 2006 that she was convinced Hamza had duped her mother, Valerie, into marrying him in order to gain the right to stay in the UK.

In 1999, Hamza's son Mohammed, then 17 years old, was arrested in Yemen with Hamza's stepson Mohssin Ghalain and eight other men. All were tried and convicted of planning a terrorist bombing campaign that the prosecution alleged Hamza had sent the men to carry out. Mohammed and Mohssin received prison sentences of three and seven years, respectively.

Hamza's Moroccan daughter-in-law was jailed for attempting to smuggle a mobile phone sim card when visiting him in Belmarsh prison in 2012. She is now facing deportation but because she is the sole carer of her son, a British national, the European Court of Justice's advocate general has ruled she cannot automatically be deported despite her criminality unless she is deemed to pose a 'serious' threat to society.

== Religious life ==
Hamza was the imam of Finsbury Park Mosque from 1997, and a leader of the Supporters of Sharia, a group that believed in a strict interpretation of Islamic law. On 14 September 1999, he sent an article to Al-Hayat, one of the largest pan-Arab newspapers, supporting the Russian apartment bombings, claiming that, while "in a war, no one targets women and children in a war", these attacks were necessary as "a Muslim revenge for the Russian criminal policies in Chechnya". In 2003, he addressed a rally in central London called by the Islamic al-Muhajiroun, where members spoke of their support for Islamist goals such as the creation of a new Islamic caliphate and replacing the Western-backed Middle Eastern regimes.

On 4 February 2003 (after being suspended since April 2002), Hamza was dismissed from his position at the Finsbury Park Mosque by the Charity Commission, the government department that regulates charities in England and Wales. After his exclusion from the mosque, he preached outside the gates until May 2004, when he was arrested at the start of US extradition proceedings against him.

Hamza publicly expressed support for Islamist goals such as creating a caliphate, and for Osama bin Laden. He wrote a paper entitled El Ansar (The Victor) in which he expressed support for the actions of the Armed Islamic Group (GIA) in Algeria, but he later rejected them when they started killing civilians. In one sermon relating to the necessity of Jihad, he said: "Allah likes those who believe in Him who kill those who do not believe in Him. Allah likes that. So if you Muslims don't like that because you hate the blood, there is something wrong with you."

On the first anniversary of the 11 September attacks, he co-organised a conference at Finsbury Park Mosque where he praised the hijackers. He allegedly associated with Abdullah el-Faisal, a Jamaican Muslim convert cleric who preached in the UK until he was imprisoned for urging his followers to murder Jews, Hindus, Christians and Americans, subsequently being deported to Jamaica in 2007.

== Arrests, charges and imprisonment ==
Hamza was arrested in December 1980, during a raid on a Soho strip club, for overstaying his tourist visa, which allowed him to stay in the UK for one month. He pleaded guilty to overstay but was allowed to remain in the UK as he was married to a British citizen, Valerie Fleming.

On 26 August 2004, Hamza was arrested under section 41 of the Terrorism Act 2000, which covers the instigation of acts of terrorism. Charges against him were dropped on 31 August 2004, but he was kept in jail whilst a US extradition case was developed and British authorities drew up further criminal charges of their own. Almost two months later, on 19 October 2004, Hamza was charged with fifteen offences under the provisions of various statutes, including encouraging the killing of non-Muslims, and intent to stir up racial hatred. The trial commenced on 5 July 2005, but was adjourned, and not resumed until 9 January 2006. On 7 February 2006, he was found guilty on eleven charges and not guilty on four:

- Guilty of six charges of soliciting murder under the Offences Against the Person Act 1861; not guilty on three further such charges.
- Guilty of three charges related to "using threatening, abusive or insulting words or behaviour with intent to stir up racial hatred, contrary to section 18 (1) of the Public Order Act 1986", not guilty on one further such charge.
- Guilty of one charge of "possession of threatening, abusive or insulting recordings of sound, with intent to stir up racial hatred, contrary to section 23 of the Public Order Act 1986".
- Guilty of one charge of "possessing a document containing information likely to be useful to a person committing or preparing an act of terrorism", under the Terrorism Act 2000, s58. This charge under the Terrorism Act of 2000 related to his possession of an Encyclopedia of Afghan Jihad, an Al Qaeda Handbook and other propaganda materials produced by Abu Hamza.

In sentencing, Mr Justice Hughes said Hamza had "helped to create an atmosphere in which to kill has become regarded by some as not only a legitimate course but a moral and religious duty in pursuit of perceived justice." Abu Hamza was sentenced to seven years' imprisonment.

In September 2012, Frank Gardner claimed that Queen Elizabeth II had been upset some years earlier that Abu Hamza al-Masri could not be arrested. The BBC apologised later that day for the claim.

=== Costs ===
On 18 January 2007, Lord Justice Hughes made an order for the recovery of the full costs of the court-appointed defence of the race-hate charges, estimated in excess of £1 million. This judgement was based on his view that "the story I have been told today (by Abu Hamza) is simply not true" that he [Abu Hamza] had no share in a £220,000 house in Greenford, west London. Hamza had claimed it belonged to his sister. The court also found that Abu Hamza was contributing £9,000 a year for private education for his children.

== Extradition to the United States ==
On 27 May 2004, Hamza was detained on remand by British authorities and appeared before magistrates at the start of a process to try to extradite him to the United States. Yemen also requested his extradition. The United States wanted Hamza to stand trial for eleven counts relating to the taking of sixteen hostages in Yemen in 1998, advocating jihad in Afghanistan in 2001, supporting James Ujaama in an alleged attempt to establish a "terrorist training camp" in late 1999 and early 2000 near Bly, Oregon, and of providing aid to al-Qaeda. Ujaama is a US citizen who had met Abu Hamza in England in 1999 and was indicted in the US for providing aid to al-Qaeda, attempting to establish a terrorist training camp, and for running a website advocating global jihad. Abu Hamza was in Britain throughout the relevant period.

On 15 November 2007, British courts gave permission for Hamza's extradition to the US. Abu Hamza appealed against this decision to the European Court of Human Rights (ECHR). In the meantime, Hamza was kept in prison after the completion of his sentence.

On 8 July 2010, the ECHR temporarily blocked Hamza's extradition to the United States to face terrorism charges until the court was satisfied that he would not be treated inhumanely. In past cases, the ECHR prevented the UK from deporting suspected foreign terrorists to places where they might be tortured. In Hamza's case, this was extended to refusing extradition to a country where he might be jailed for life, and where the prison regime is judged too harsh. The court said there should be further legal argument on whether life without parole would be a breach of human rights. The court asked for fresh submissions on whether Hamza, and other prisoners awaiting extradition, would face inhumane treatment in the US if they were sent there to stand trial.

On 24 September 2012, the UK court agreed Hamza could be extradited to the US to face terrorism charges. After considering all evidence statements by officials at the US ADX Florence penitentiary, the court held that "conditions at ADX would not amount to ill-treatment" and also stated that "not all inmates convicted of international terrorism were housed at ADX and, even if they were, sufficient procedural safeguards were in place, such as holding a hearing before deciding on such a transfer" and that "if the transfer process had been unsatisfactory, there was the possibility of bringing a claim to both the Federal Bureau of Prisons' administrative remedy programme and the US federal courts", referring to the 28 CFR 542 Administrative Remedy Program. On 26 September, a High Court judge halted the extradition after Hamza launched a last-ditch appeal but on 5 October 2012 the High Court granted the UK's government's request to extradite Hamza to the US. The removal process took place that same evening, when Hamza was taken from HM Prison Long Lartin to RAF Mildenhall in Suffolk, where he was placed into the hands of the United States Marshals Service.

Abu Hamza arrived in the US on the morning of 6 October 2012 to face eleven charges relating to hostage taking, conspiracy to establish a militant training camp and calling for holy war in Afghanistan. He appeared in the United States District Court for the Southern District of New York on 6 October and was then taken into custody. He appeared in court again on 9 October and pleaded not guilty to eleven charges.

On 14 April 2014, his trial opened with jury selection. His lawyer, Joshua Dratel, claimed Abu Hamza cooperated with MI5 and the police to help interact with the British Muslim community. On 19 May 2014, he was found guilty of the terror charges. British Home Secretary Theresa May said that she was "pleased" that Abu Hamza had "finally faced justice". On 9 January 2015, Hamza was sentenced to life in prison without the possibility of parole, and the entire sentence would be served at ADX Florence in Colorado. In U.S. confinement, his hook devices were confiscated and replaced with a prosthetic spork.

In late August 2020, The Times reported that Abu Hamza had filed a lawsuit against the US Attorney General William Barr over what he described as "inhumane and degrading" conditions at ADX Florence. Hamza's complaints included solitary confinement, the removal of his prosthetic hooks despite his lack of forearms, sustaining tooth decay from opening food packages, and encountering "religious stress" from eating kosher food.

== Books and booklets ==
He wrote the following books and booklets:

- Be Aware of Takfir Np, nd.
- Ruling by Man Made Law, is it Major or Minor Kufr? Explaining the Words of ibn Abbas (Supporters of Shariah, 1996).
- Allah's Governance on Earth. Np, 1999.

== See also ==
- Abu Qatada
