= Mutt and Jeff (spies) =

Norwegian spies

Mutt
- Born: John Herbert Neal Moe; 31 May 1919; London, England
- Died: 7 July 2001 (aged 82); Oslo, Norway
- Citizenship: British-Norwegian (dual citizenship)
- Occupation: Spy
- Years active: 1941–1944

Jeff
- Born: Tor Glad; 5 August 1916; Bestum, Oslo, Norway
- Citizenship: Norwegian
- Occupation: Spy
- Years active: 1941–1943

Mutt and Jeff were two Norwegian spies who worked for the United Kingdom and MI5 and were members of the Double Cross System.

In April 1941 two Norwegians, John "Helge" Moe (Mutt) and Tor Glad (Jeff) fetched up on a remote Aberdeenshire beach in Scotland, having travelled by seaplane and rubber dinghy. They immediately turned themselves in to the local police as German spies. MI5 soon 'turned' them, assigning them their codenames, which were the names of a pair of cartoon strip characters (see Mutt and Jeff). 'Mutt and Jeff' is also rhyming slang for 'deaf'.

Mutt and Jeff's mission was supposed to be one of sabotage, as well as having a secondary intelligence role, reporting (via wireless) military locations, deployments and civilian morale. MI5 used Mutt and Jeff's radio sets to relay false information, leading the Germans to believe that the United Kingdom intended to invade Norway (this activity was a component of Operation Fortitude). To ensure the German handlers did not suspect Mutt and Jeff of having sold out, MI5 arranged for fake sabotage operations - supposedly the work of the pair - to take place, in one case going so far as to set off a controlled explosion at a power plant which was widely reported in the local media as a genuine attack.

Doubts about Glad's reliability led MI5 to eventually intern him in 1943, and his radio transmissions were carried on by Moe until February 1944. By then MI5 believed that the Germans may have learned of Glad's detention, and so the operation was brought to a close.
