= UK–US extradition treaty of 2003 =

The UK–US extradition treaty of 2003 was implemented by the UK in the Extradition Act 2003 and came into force in April 2007 following its ratification by the US Senate in 2006.

== Controversy ==
The allegedly one-sided treaty allows the US to demand extradition of British citizens and other nationals for offences committed against US law, even though the alleged offence may have been committed in the UK by a person living and working in the UK (see, for example, the NatWest Three), there is no evidence to suggest this is not reciprocal, but no such cases have occurred to date; and there are issues about the level of proof required to extradite from the UK to the US versus from the US to the UK, although it has since been established that they are “effectively” the same levels of proof.

Among other provisions Part 2 of the Act: Extradition to category 2 territories (non-European Arrest Warrant territories) removed the requirement on the US to provide prima facie evidence in extraditions from the UK, requiring instead only reasonable suspicion. This was necessary to redress the previous imbalance against the US under the 1870 Act, as the UK did not have to provide the more onerous prima facie evidence to extradite from the US. The requirement for the UK is to show probable cause. However, an independent legal review carried out by Sir Scott Baker found that "there is no significant difference between the probable cause test and the reasonable suspicion test. There is no practical difference between the information submitted to and from the United States."

The manner of its implementation caused concern because of alleged secrecy and minimal parliamentary scrutiny.

In response to these concerns, the Home Secretary Theresa May appointed Lord Justice Scott Baker to conduct an official review of the UK's extradition treaties, with the assistance of two independent extradition experts. The review was directed to address evidence standards and whether the US–UK extradition treaty is unbalanced. Baker's report was presented to the Home Secretary on September 30, 2011, and concluded that there is no substantial difference in evidence standards, that the treaty is balanced and that there is not "any basis to conclude that extradition from the United Kingdom to the US operates unfairly or oppressively". The review contradicts the findings of Parliament's Joint Committee on Human Rights (JCHR), which was intended to form part of the government's full extradition review and which called for the government to renegotiate the UK's extradition treaty with the United States to ensure British citizens get the same protection as Americans.

The Home Affairs Select Committee published a report in 2012 into the UK–US extradition treaty and Extradition Act, acknowledging the low level of public confidence in the UK's extradition legislation. The committee were particularly critical of the failure of the Home Office to publish the evidence that lies behind the Home Office-commissioned Scott Baker review – the only review to conclude that the US/UK Treaty was not imbalanced. The committee had "serious misgivings" about some aspects of the US/UK arrangements but was at pains to recognise the importance of an effective extradition arrangement between the two countries. With respect to the differing legal standards of evidence required in support of an extradition request, the Committee accepted that there was "little or no distinction in practice between the 'probable cause' and 'reasonable suspicion' tests". The Committee further acknowledged that "extradition imposes a significant burden on the accused". On the most controversial of issues – that of forum – that campaigners have long been seeking to have introduced in British legislation, the committee delivers perhaps its strongest message to Parliament: "The Committee believes that it would be in the interests of justice for decisions about forum in cases where there is concurrent jurisdiction to be taken by a judge in open court, where the defendant will have the opportunity to put his case, rather than in private by prosecutors". The Committee concludes by recognising that it proposes significant amendments to the current legislation given the loss of public confidence in the current system. The Committee urges the government "to act with greater urgency" to rectify the issues the report has identified.

Many say that the issue of forum is the key reform that will help bring an end to ongoing and future injustices that they say have occurred under the Extradition Act 2003.

In April 2012 it was revealed in a Freedom of Information request to the British Home Office that no US citizens have been extradited from the US to the UK under this treaty for crimes committed while the person was in the US.

== US ratification, 2006 ==
The US–UK Extradition Treaty 2003 was first sent to the US Senate for approval in April 2004. But another component of the controversy noted above was a result of the delay of the US in ratifying it into US law. Baroness Scotland, British Minister of State for the Criminal Justice System at the Home Office, travelled to the US on Thursday 13 July 2006 to address this problem. This move was prompted by political criticism of the Extradition Act 2003 within the UK and an opposition proposal to amend the Act in the House of Lords. It also coincided with public disquiet at the case of the NatWest Three who were extradited on the same date. This meant the NatWest three were extradited to the US under the US–UK Extradition Treaty 2003, even though that treaty had not been ratified in the US.

On 30 September 2006 the US Senate unanimously ratified the treaty. Home Secretary John Reid said he was "delighted" that Baroness Scotland's visit to the US over the summer succeeded in getting Senate agreement, saying "The treaty is an important measure in our fight against serious international crime".

Ratification had been slowed by complaints from some Irish-American groups that the treaty would potentially create new legal jeopardy for members of the Provisional IRA who escaped to the US during The Troubles and their American supporters.

== US cases where the treaty has been applied ==
From January 2004 to the end of December 2011, seven known US citizens were extradited from the US to the UK. No US citizen was extradited for an alleged crime while the person was based in the US. The US embassy in London reports that, as of April 2013, 38 individuals have been extradited from the US to the UK.

== UK cases where the Act has been applied ==
From January 2004 to the end of December 2011, 33 known British citizens (including 6 with dual nationality) were extradited from the UK to the US. The US embassy in London reported that as of April 2013, 77 individuals had been extradited from the UK to the US. The US argued that this is not disproportionate, due to the US population being about five times larger than the British population.

- Gary McKinnon – extradition blocked on 16 October 2012 by order of Home Secretary Theresa May, on the grounds that "Mr McKinnon's extradition would give rise to such a high risk of him ending his life that a decision to extradite would be incompatible with Mr McKinnon's human rights."
- NatWest Three – extradited to Texas on fraud charges against a British bank while they were living in the UK and working for the British bank. Arriving in the US on 13 July 2006 they eventually pleaded guilty to wire fraud in a plea bargain.
- Babar Ahmad – extradited in 2012 on charges of running web sites supporting the Chechen and Afghan insurgencies while in the UK.
- Syed Talha Ahsan – extradited in 2012 on charges of running web sites supporting the Chechen and Afghan insurgencies while in the UK, co-defendant with Babar Ahmad
- Abu Hamza al-Masri – extradited to the US on 5 October 2012, among other things accused of conspiring with convicted American terrorist James Ujaama while in the UK.
- Alex Stone – alleged child abuse, charges subsequently dropped after 6 months in US jail. According to Mr. Stone "there appeared to be no defence to extradition and no evidence at all was presented in this case".
- Ian Norris of Morgan Crucible – alleged price fixing (while in the UK and price fixing was not a crime in the UK at the time). Extradition overturned by the House of Lords on appeal. Subsequent extradition request on obstruction of justice charges approved in July 2008, extradited March 2010.
- Wojciech Chodan and Jeffrey Tesler – face extradition over their alleged role in a Nigerian bribery scandal, but argue that almost none of the misconduct they are accused of was connected to the US and that the alleged bribery plot took place mainly in the UK or Nigeria.
- Richard O'Dwyer – extradition request made in May 2011. The extradition request follows the Southern District Court in New York bringing two charges against Richard O'Dwyer for criminal copyright infringement in relation to TVShack.net while in the UK. The two charges, conspiracy to commit copyright infringement and criminal infringement of copyright, each carry a maximum sentence of five years.
- Christopher Tappin – extradition request made in 2010. Accused of selling batteries to be used in Iranian surface-to-air missiles while in the UK. Mr Tappin says he was approached by US agents asking him to ship batteries from the US to the Netherlands who sent paperwork saying that permits were not required and then sought to have him arrested and extradited. A spokesman for Tappin's lawyers said "This is a case in which the Customs agents caused the offence to be committed rather than merely providing an opportunity for the defendant to commit it." On 9 January 2013, Tappin was given a 33-month prison sentence for arms dealing and fined US$11,357 (£7,095).
- David McIntyre, an ex-soldier, was serving in Afghanistan when in July 2012 he was ordered to return to the UK after being accused of fraud following another man naming him in a plea bargain. He was extradited on 3 July 2014.
