= NatWest Three =

British businessmen indicted for fraud

The NatWest Three, also known as the Enron Three, are the British businessmen Giles Darby, David Bermingham and Gary Mulgrew. In 2002, they were indicted in Houston, Texas, on seven counts of wire fraud against their former employer, Greenwich NatWest, as part of the Enron scandal.

After a high-profile battle in the British courts, the three men were extradited from the United Kingdom to the United States in 2006. On 28 November 2007, each pleaded guilty to one count of wire fraud in exchange for the other charges being dropped. On 22 February 2008, they were each sentenced to 37 months in prison. Initially they were jailed in the US, but were later repatriated to British prisons to serve out the rest of their sentences. They were released from custody in August 2010.

== Background ==
In 2000, Giles Darby, David Bermingham and Gary Mulgrew worked for Greenwich NatWest, then a unit of National Westminster Bank, which was later acquired by Royal Bank of Scotland (RBS). The three were involved in Greenwich NatWest's dealings with the American energy company Enron. As a result of these dealings, NatWest owned a stake in a Cayman Islands-registered partnership, Swap Sub.

Swap Sub was a special-purpose entity created by Andrew Fastow, Enron's CFO, ostensibly for the purpose of hedging Enron's investment in Rhythms NetConnections, an internet service provider. Swap Sub's assets consisted of cash and Enron stock. Its liability was an option giving Enron the ability to require it to buy Enron's entire investment in Rhythms NetConnections at a predetermined price in 2004. In addition to NatWest, Credit Suisse First Boston held an equal stake in Swap Sub. The remainder was owned by a partnership managed by Fastow.

In March 2000, Enron terminated the hedging arrangement with Swap Sub. Fastow persuaded Enron to pay Swap Sub a $30 million fee to terminate the option and recover the Enron stock it owned, even though, because of a decline in the price of the Rhythms stock, Swap Sub owed Enron a large amount of money. $10 million of the payment went to Credit Suisse First Boston; Fastow falsely claimed to Enron that the other $20 million would go to NatWest, but in fact only $1 million did so. The payment, which was formally agreed on 22 March 2000, resulted in large profits for Swap Sub, enriching several Enron employees who had acquired ownership interests in the partnership.

== Crime ==
According to the Statement of Facts which was signed by all three defendants as part of their eventual plea bargain, the Three realized in early 2000 that, because of rises in the stock prices of Enron and Rhythms, NatWest's interest in Swap Sub "had quite some value". On 22 February of that year, the three bankers made a presentation to Enron CFO Andrew Fastow suggesting ways in which this value could be captured; however, Fastow ultimately rejected this proposal.

Shortly afterwards, Fastow contacted Gary Mulgrew in late February or early March 2000 and offered to purchase NatWest's interest in Swap Sub. He also offered Mulgrew what is described in the Statement of Facts as "an unspecified financial opportunity" if he were to leave NatWest. Mulgrew discussed this conversation with Darby and Bermingham. On 6 March 2000, Fastow's assistant Michael Kopper contacted Darby with a formal proposal that a company Kopper controlled should purchase NatWest's stake in Swap Sub for $1 million. Mulgrew and Darby subsequently recommended to their superiors that NatWest should accept this offer.

Later that month, the three bankers learned that the "unspecified financial opportunity" which had been mentioned to Mulgrew involved their personally acquiring a portion of NatWest's stake in Swap Sub. In furtherance of this, Kopper set up a deal for the Three to acquire a put option on half of NatWest's former stake in the company. On 17 March, Darby collected the signatures needed to finalize the NatWest sale. On 20 March the Three executed the option agreement with Kopper. The Three concealed both their dealings with Fastow and Kopper, and the fact that they now had a financial interest in the company that bought Swap Sub, from their superiors at NatWest.

According to the Statement of Facts, the Three were unaware of the 22 March agreement to pay $30 million to Swap Sub. On 21 April 2000, Bermingham, who had resigned from NatWest in the meantime, exercised the options, resulting in a profit of more than $7 million. He subsequently split the proceeds with Darby and Mulgrew.

== Timeline of legal proceedings ==
=== FSA investigation ===
In November 2001 the three bankers, having now moved to work at Royal Bank of Canada, learned that the US Securities and Exchange Commission (SEC) was investigating Fastow and voluntarily met with the British Financial Services Authority (FSA) to discuss the deal. According to their own account, the Three initiated this meeting in order to "ensure transparency". Bermingham later claimed that "[w]e gave [the FSA] everything because we thought we had nothing to hide."

In February 2002 the FSA completed its inquiries without taking any action. It later emerged that the FSA had passed the results of its investigation to the SEC, which had in turn passed them on to the prosecutors in the US Department of Justice. According to a report in The Times the FSA report was so detailed that it told the SEC whom to interview and what evidence would be needed to secure a conviction, and concluded that "there appears to be evidence that the three individuals were subject to a major conflict of interest".

=== Issue of arrest warrants and indictment ===
US arrest warrants for the Three were issued in June 2002. They were indicted by a grand jury in Houston, Texas in September of the same year on seven counts of wire fraud. The warrants were among the first issued by Enron prosecutors; media reports speculated that their main purpose was to induce the Three into a plea bargain whereby they would testify against Kopper and Fastow (seen as more important prosecution targets) in exchange for reduced sentences.

During the long delay caused by the decision of the Three to fight extradition, however, Kopper and Fastow both pleaded guilty and entered into plea bargains themselves. Thus, in an ironic turn of events, Kopper and Fastow were likely to have been the key prosecution witnesses against the Three if the case had gone to trial.

The indictment set out seven counts of wire fraud, each one corresponding to a document (fax, email or wire transfer) that was transmitted electronically in the United States in furtherance of the alleged fraudulent scheme. In addition to the facts agreed to as part of the eventual plea bargain, the indictment alleged that the Three knew, at the time they recommended the sale of Swap Sub to NatWest, that its value was significantly greater than $1 million, and that the 22 February presentation to Fastow was part of the fraudulent scheme. Although Enron officials were involved, the indictment did not allege that Enron Corporation itself was a victim of the scheme, or that the Three's activities had any connection to Enron's collapse.

The evidence against the NatWest Three included preparations for the 22 February presentation, which contained the phrase

Problem is that it is too obvious (to both Enron and LPs) what is happening (ie, robbery of LPs), so probably not attractive. Also no certainty of making money ...

Prosecutors alleged that the use of the word "robbery" in the presentation showed that the Three knew that they were planning to commit a crime. They also cited the discrepancy between the amounts of money accepted by NatWest ($1 million) and Credit Suisse First Boston ($10 million) for their equal stakes in Swap Sub.

=== Extradition to the United States ===
US prosecutors began to pursue proceedings in what they expected to be a "routine" extradition in the summer of 2002. The Three were arrested in Britain on 23 April 2004. Extradition proceedings under the Extradition Act 2003 commenced in June of that year amid widespread controversy.

In September 2004 a judge at Bow Street Magistrates' Court ruled that the extradition could proceed. The Three responded by suing Britain's Serious Fraud Office (SFO) in the High Court of Justice, seeking judicial review to force a prosecution in the UK which would have taken precedence over the US investigation.

In response the SFO issued a statement defending its decision to defer to prosecutors in the US:

When we considered a submission by the three former NatWest employees that we should open an investigation for potential prosecution in this jurisdiction the balanced view we took was that the US authorities had a stronger call on the matter. Alleged acts performed by the three were conducted in the US, thus their alleged fraud was conducted in the same jurisdiction as was the overall issue surrounding Enron. The place of residence of the three (ie, the UK) was not considered to be an over-riding consideration. The defendants were already indicted in the US in an investigation that had been in progress for some time and where the evidence had already been marshaled and assessed

After a significant delay, the extradition was endorsed by Home Secretary Charles Clarke in May 2005. The Three appealed this decision also in the High Court. On 20 February 2006 both the appeal against extradition and the suit to force the SFO to prosecute (which were consolidated into one case) were rejected by the High Court. The bankers appealed further to the House of Lords, but this appeal failed on 21 June 2006. On 27 June 2006 the Three lost an appeal to the European Court of Human Rights. Rumours in the British press that the government would support the Three's case were rejected by Attorney General Lord Goldsmith on 7 July 2006.

=== Initial court proceedings in the United States ===
After all legal avenues of appeal against extradition had been exhausted, the Three arrived in Houston on 13 July 2006. They spent one night in that city's Federal Detention Center before being released into the custody of their attorney, under a requirement that they wear electronic monitoring devices. On 21 July, a judge ruled that the Three could go free on bond but could not leave the Houston area, could not meet with each other without their lawyers present, and were required to raise between $80,000 and $150,000 by the end of the month. US immigration services gave them permission to accept employment in the US for a period of one year, but, because of the judge's order, they were not permitted to leave the Houston area to seek or obtain work.

=== Trial date postponements ===
On 2 August 2006 the trial date was delayed indefinitely from 13 September 2006, in order to allow two of the Three to secure legal representation. On 9 August 2006 the legal situation of the Three was complicated by subpoenas served on them in an Enron-related civil suit against Royal Bank of Canada. On 12 August 2006 all three informed the judge that they had retained attorneys.

On 6 September 2006, the trial date was set for February 2007 if witnesses could be obtained in time, failing that for 4 September 2007. Until that time the Three were required to wear monitoring devices and were forbidden from leaving the Houston area. On 1 August 2007, the trial date was moved back yet again to January 2008. This was following another earlier postponement to 22 October. This further delay was a significant blow to the three, and their supporters stressed again the problems they were facing with the scale of legal fees and further separation from their families in the UK.

=== Witnesses controversy ===
On 6 August 2007, the Three asked the judge in the case to order six former colleagues living in Britain to provide video testimony for their defence. In a court filing explaining this request, they alleged that "[s]everal individuals now refuse to travel to the United States to appear on defendants' behalf because they feel, or have been, threatened by the [US] government". Such a request would have required the co-operation of British authorities.

The Three's filing also claimed that Royal Bank of Scotland was obstructing attempts to contact a larger group of thirty-six employees who were also potential witnesses, claiming that "[t]he Royal Bank of Scotland and the Royal Bank of Canada have… taken steps to prevent Defendants from securing the testimony of former colleagues", and that "counsel for the purported victim in this case [RBS] has interfered with the ability of defence counsel to obtain relevant testimony". They concluded that the Three's ability "to mount a vigorous defence has thereby been severely compromised, if not eviscerated". The Three went so far as to publicly name the prospective witnesses in the hope that that would encourage some of them to speak out.

=== Plea bargain ===
On 28 November 2007, the Three accepted a plea bargain, pleading guilty to one count of wire fraud. In exchange, prosecutors agreed to drop the other six counts, and to support the application by the Three to serve part of their sentences in the United Kingdom. In the plea agreement, the Three pleaded guilty to count four of the indictment, relating to the email from London to Houston of the final Swap Sub sale documents. A "statement of facts" was appended to the plea agreement as Exhibit A and was signed by all three defendants.

Prosecutor Alice Fisher stated, "[t]hese three defendants admitted today that they defrauded NatWest by entering into a secret and illegal deal with officers from Enron – a deal that yielded millions in profits for them personally at the expense of their employer". However, an article in The Daily Telegraph argued that the guilty pleas were motivated not by actual guilt, but rather by the prospect of further delays before the trial and possible 35-year sentences if convicted. Other British commentators agreed that this was a possibility. The Telegraph piece went on to claim that the statement of facts did not state that the Three knowingly defrauded NatWest. The original indictment alleged that the Three knew that NatWest's stake was worth far more than the $1 million it was being sold for; the statement of facts claimed only that bankers believed it was likely that they would make significant amounts of money as a result of the transaction, based on information that they concealed from their employer.

In August 2010 Bermingham and Mulgrew appeared in a video on ungagged.net, a site devoted to attacking the US Department of Justice's handling of the Enron collapse. In the video David Bermingham recanted his guilty plea, and both he and Mulgrew claimed that they had been pressured into accepting plea bargains, attacking the US judicial system and characterising their treatment as "torture". Giles Darby said that he "fundamentally" disagreed with the claims made by Bermingham and Mulgrew in the video.

=== Sentencing and prison ===
The NatWest Three were sentenced on 22 February 2008 to 37 months of imprisonment. They were also required to repay $7.3 million to RBS Securities, the successor bank to Greenwich NatWest, of which $1.25 million would be due when the men surrendered themselves to prison authorities. During sentencing, the Three each made brief statements to the judge. Mulgrew said that he had shown a "lack of integrity" and "exercised poor judgement", concluding that "I have no one to blame but myself". Darby admitted that he was "wrong", and said "I deeply regret my involvement in this whole affair."

Darby's lawyer stated that "Andy Fastow and the culture of greed at Enron corrupted everybody and everything it came in contact with", and added that the Three "are as much victims as anybody else." The Three requested to be assigned to the low-security federal prison in Allenwood, Pennsylvania. In April 2008, each was assigned to a different prison: Mulgrew was ordered to surrender to the facility in Big Spring, Texas on 30 April; Giles Darby to the Allenwood facility on 7 May; and David Bermingham to the prison in Lompoc, California, on 9 May.

Mulgrew, Darby and Bermingham were assigned consecutive federal inmate numbers (66096-179, 66097-179 and 66098-179 respectively). They were later allowed to serve the remainder of their sentence in England. Bermingham was moved from Spring Hill Open Prison to a closed prison in Grendon Underwood in August 2009. The three were released in August 2010.

== Public relations campaign in Britain ==
Press coverage of the Three in Britain was initially mostly negative, focusing on the amount of money the men had gained and their extravagant lifestyles.

For example, The Independent wrote that the men saw themselves as "womanising buccaneers who played as hard and as fast as they pursued their deals", and The Sunday Times described Mulgrew as "fiercely competitive" with "a massive ego" and "scars on his arms" from his former career as a nightclub bouncer. The tone of the reporting changed when the Three secured the services of Bell Yard Communications, a public relations firm which specialised in "public reputation management during times of corporate crisis or dispute", headed by Melanie Riley. Adrian Flook of M: Communications was also involved. Both firms claimed to be working pro bono. Riley said that "I have been working pro bono for the last six months because I believe in the case. We have worked hard to ensure that people understood the inequity of the Extradition Act."

Guardian journalist Nick Davies, in his book Flat Earth News, described the strategy adopted by Bell Yard:

According to some of those involved, when Bell Yard took on the case of the three bankers, its founder, Melanie Riley, rapidly saw the story she wanted. Fleet Street must stop talking about the alleged guilt and extravagance of these three men and must focus instead on one single aspect of their case, the new Extradition Act under whose terms the three men now faced trial in Texas.

Davies later recounted the reaction of the press:

The media could have refused to go along with Bell Yard's strategy. In practice, they went for it, like a baby fastening on a teat. Melanie Riley pushed the story personally with journalists from every publication and broadcast outlet. The suspects became victims of the law. The stories about high-living womanisers became features about family men, worried about their children. The former bouncer and his cronies became "the NatWest Three" with its echo of the wrongly convicted Guildford Four and Birmingham Six.

Riley summed up her strategy as follows:

Originally we focused on a political and civil liberties audience. ... But we moved the issue on to focus on the impact it would have on the business community in particular."

M: Communications co-founder Nick Miles added:

It is not a matter of whether or not they are guilty – although they have always expressed their innocence... Our role was to convince editors of the validity of our argument: that Britain's new extradition laws have anomalies.

An article in the Financial Times also highlighted the achievements of the public relations team:

[PR experts involved with the case] believe that the main achievement of the campaign has been to highlight their side's view of the inequality of the extradition arrangements. But perhaps even more of an achievement is that the public perception of the three has been turned from that of apparently wealthy bankers, alleged to have been involved in an £11m fraud and attempting to escape justice, to deeply wronged men being ripped from the bosoms of their families, destined for servitude in a vile penitentiary.

The Three feature as victims of British justice in the £500,000 documentary Taking Liberties, made by Bermingham's film finance acquaintance.

== Extradition controversy ==
The extensive news coverage of the Three in Britain resulted in a large-scale debate over the merits of their extradition to the United States under the then new Extradition Act 2003. In particular, a high-profile campaign against the extradition was led by The Daily Telegraph newspaper. Several arguments were raised against the extradition.

=== Jurisdiction argument ===
It was argued that the crime was committed by British citizens living in Britain against a British company based in London, the nation's capital city and that, therefore, any resulting criminal case fell under British legal and territorial jurisdiction and should be tried by a British court. However, British authorities decided not to prosecute due to a purported lack of evidence.

=== Fair trial argument ===
Some argued that it would be very difficult for Three to receive a fair trial in Texas. The case could have taken years to come to trial. The trial was scheduled to begin in September 2006, but was repeatedly postponed to January 2008. The three accused men would be forced to remain in the US, far away from their families in the UK. Additionally, while on bail they would be unable to find gainful employment in order to fund a legal defence against the charges brought against them. (The Three were permitted to seek employment in the US provided they remained in Houston.)

It was also claimed that the defendants would be handicapped in preparing a defence because most of the evidence and witnesses were overseas in the UK. They argued that witnesses would be reluctant to come to Texas.

=== Extradition inequality argument ===
It was alleged that the extradition arrangements between the US and the UK were highly unequal. The Act's terms made it easier to extradite British citizens to America than vice versa. There has been much criticism of the fact that the Americans do not have to produce a prima facie case to extradite British citizens, whereas there was no comparable facility to extradite US citizens to the UK. Despite this, the head of Britain's Serious Fraud Office, Robert Wardle, has claimed that there would have been enough evidence to extradite the Three to the US even under the old extradition arrangements. He expressed astonishment that the men had become a "cause célèbre", and expressed confidence that the Three would get a fair trial in the US. Supporters of the Three claim that when the extradition law was passed in the wake of 11 September the British government stated that it was only to be used in the so-called war against terror and if the treaty was ratified by the US. However, neither of these conditions was written into the text of the extradition law, and neither had been fulfilled in the case of the Three at the time of their extradition. (The treaty was subsequently ratified by the US in September 2006.)

== House of Commons debate ==
The Speaker of the House of Commons, Michael Martin, allowed an emergency debate, on 12 July 2006, on both the treaty and the 'Natwest Three' after a request by Liberal Democrat MP Nick Clegg.

== Neil Coulbeck ==
On 12 July 2006, a former Royal Bank of Scotland (RBS) executive and FBI prosecution witness Neil Coulbeck had been found dead, after committing suicide by slitting his wrists. Coulbeck had worked for RBS until 2004, latterly as Head of Group Treasury.

It had been suggested by friends and family that the FBI 'hounded' Coulbeck. At the inquest into his death, Coulbeck's wife stated that he had been deeply disturbed by the extradition of the Three, and it was known that he had provided a crucial statement which in part led to their extradition. The FBI denied this, saying that it had interviewed Coulbeck only once, four years earlier.

== Relevance in future extradition cases ==
The case of the NatWest Three was cited in Parliament in relation to the 2020 US extradition request for Mike Lynch, founder of software company Autonomy. David Davis stated:

As soon as [the Three] stepped off the plane in the US, before a trial had even begun, they were treated like convicted criminals. Handcuffed and frogmarched to the jail, they were treated with contempt by marshals and subjected to a comprehensive and intrusive full-body search. It highlighted the classic approach that US authorities take. They were told that if they pleaded not guilty, they would be denied bail and get 35 years in a high-security US prison, but if they pleaded guilty, they would get only three years, possibly serving some of it in a British jail. In the end, they were sentenced to 37 months in a Texas prison because they gave way to the pressure. That is standard practice in the American system, which has a corrosive over-reliance on plea bargains. Ninety-seven per cent. of cases are settled by a plea bargain in the United States. In the US, mandatory sentencing means that it is the prosecutor who determines the sentence, not the judge, which allows the prosecutor to operate a sort of judicial blackmail. The US imprisons a higher proportion of its citizens than any other country in the world. There are many reasons for that, but no doubt the ferocious use of plea bargains is a major factor.

== Publications ==
- Bermingham, David (10 February 2020). "Extradition to the US 'is designed for one outcome — jail'". Times. London.
  - Comments on the attempt by the US to extradite Autonomy founder Mike Lynch: "[i]t is a near statistical certainty that someone extradited to the US will end up guilty, most probably through a plea bargain rather than going to trial, because the criminal justice system in the US is so heavily geared towards this outcome".
- Darby, Giles (2021). Inside Allenwood: The Story of a British Banker inside a US Prison. Shrewsbury: Quiller Publishing. ISBN 9781846893292.
  - "[A]longside the horror stories about gang beatings and brutality, Giles also wrote about the larger-than-life characters he met and the unexpected antics of his fellow inmates."
- Mulgrew, Gary (2012). Gang of One: One Man's Incredible Battle to Find his Missing Daughter. London: Hodder & Stoughton. ISBN 978-1-4447-3790-5.
  - "The remarkable true story of one man’s journey from a Glasgow orphanage to a notorious gang-infested prison in Texas. Driven by his desire to return to his son in England and haunted by the increasingly frustrating search for his missing daughter".

== See also ==
- Babar Ahmad
- David Carruthers
- Peter Dicks
- Gary McKinnon
- Christopher Tappin
- Syed Talha Ahsan
- Richard O'Dwyer

== Bibliography ==
- Fox, Loren (2004). Enron: The Rise and Fall. Hoboken, NJ: Wiley. ISBN 0-471-43220-2.
- "Statement of Facts (Exhibit A to Plea Agreement, United States v. David Bermingham, Giles Darby and Gary Mulgrew)" (PDF). 28 November 2007.
