= Christopher Tappin =

British businessman (born 1946)

- Born: Christopher Harold Tappin; November 1946 (age 79); Bromley, Kent, England
- Occupation: Businessman
- Spouse: Elaine Patricia Sculthorp (m. 1974)
- Children: 2

Christopher Harold Tappin (born November 1946) is a British businessman who is best known for selling weapons parts to Iran in violation of international sanctions and jailed for 33 months in January 2013.

== Accusation ==
In 2005, U.S. Immigration and Customs Enforcement agents established a front company, Mercury Global Enterprises (MGE). A business acquaintance of Tappin contacted the company initially to buy surveillance equipment. They later enquired about exporting other military hardware without the proper licenses. Shortly before the man was arrested for trying to buy zinc/silver oxide batteries to power MIM-23 Hawk surface-to-air missiles for a customer in Tehran, Tappin was named as an exporter.

US federal authorities allege Tappin tried to buy 50 Eagle-Picher P/N GAP 4328 zinc/silver oxide batteries (National Stock Number: 1420-00-484-8556) between December 2005 and January 2007. The batteries, which were to be exported from the United States to Iran via the Netherlands, are part of the electronics of the Hawk surface-to-air missile. In November 1985, 18 Hawk missiles were shipped to Iran during the Reagan Administration. Tappin maintains as the exporter he thought he was buying car batteries. The US maintains that the batteries were to be exported to Tehran without the necessary US government approval.

== Arrest and extradition to the United States ==
A federal arrest warrant for Tappin was first issued by a grand jury in Texas in 2007. In January 2012 Tappin lost his final appeal against extradition to the US under the Extradition Act 2003. On denying Tappin's appeal against extradition to the United States, Mr Justice Cranston, a judge of the High Court of England and Wales, considered whether the case was the result of entrapment by US agents, concluding:

Gibson, [Tappin]’s co-conspirator, approached MGE officers, not the other way around, and said that he had already conducted illegal export activities with [Tappin]. After Gibson dropped out, [Tappin] pursued the order and made clear that ultimately he wanted 35 batteries. [Tappin] devised the cover that the batteries were for electroplating by a Dutch chemical company. MGE’s agents gave [Tappin] an opportunity to withdraw from the transaction on 19 October [2006], after he had stopped payment, but [Tappin] persisted.

Tappin's alleged co-conspirators were Robert Frederick Gibson (a British citizen) who pleaded guilty in 2007 and was sentenced to 2 years imprisonment, and Robert Thomas Caldwell (a US citizen) who was convicted at trial in 2007 and sentenced to one year and eight months imprisonment.

On 24 February 2012, Tappin surrendered himself to British authorities at Heathrow Airport Police Station, London. Shortly afterwards he was handed over to US Marshals to be flown to the United States. His UK-based solicitor, Karen Todner, said that due to the difficulty in getting witnesses from the UK to testify in the US, and other difficulties in mounting a defence, it was likely that Tappin would make some form of plea bargain with American prosecutors. A few minutes before entering Heathrow Airport Police Station, Tappin spoke with news reporters, stating that:

I look to Mr Cameron to look after my rights and he has failed to do so. I have no rights. Abu Qatada is walking the streets of London today and we cannot extradite him. He has more rights than I have. If I was a terrorist I would not be going to America. I think it’s a shame, a disgrace. The Conservative government, while in opposition, promised to reform the law and they failed to do so and they’ve let me down, they’ve let you down, they’ve let the whole country down.

Tappin was flown to El Paso, Texas via Houston on United Airlines flights and incarcerated in Otero County jail in New Mexico before his first court hearing. At his own request, he was held in isolation. He appeared in court on 29 February wearing an orange-colored prison jumpsuit, handcuffed and in shackles. Tappin was remanded in custody until 2 March. On 28 February, Elaine Tappin (his wife) addressed MPs on the Commons home affairs committee to express her dismay that UK courts were not interested in her husband's case. She stated that she was astonished that what she described as a "preposterous request" from US officials could be taken seriously by British courts.

On 5 March, Judge Robert Castaneda ruled that Tappin must remain in custody after prosecutors asked that he be detained for the duration of the proceedings because he "posed a flight risk". Assistant US attorney Greg McDonald told the court that "the risk is not that he'll punch somebody in the face, but through the use of a computer and the knowledge he has, he might pose a danger to the community." On 8 March, Karen Todner (Tappin's solicitor in the UK) urged the British government to intervene over the bail refusal. Eventually, on 25 April 2012, Tappin was bailed on condition that he wore an electronic tracking tag at all times. Additionally, his ability to travel was restricted to within two Texas counties as well as the border city of El Paso for court appearances. After being released on bail, Tappin told the BBC that he planned to vigorously defend himself against the allegations, stating that:

I'm not a terrorist. I've never had any connections with terrorism and I'm just appalled that things could come to this sort of stage - especially in my life now, when I'm 65, been retired for four years and enjoying retirement. I didn't know these batteries were for Hawk missiles and too, I didn't know they were destined for Iran.

== Extradition controversy ==
Tappin's removal to the United States to stand trial has been criticised by the (was) Leader of the UK Independence Party, Nigel Farage MEP, who sent an open letter to Theresa May about the issue and also set up an ePetition for opponents of Tappin's extradition to sign. The ePetition states: "In the light of the Chris Tappin case, demands that David Cameron debates the US-UK extradition treaty with President Obama, with a view to amending it". The requested debate did take place on 14 March 2012 but it remains to be seen whether it will produce any results.

Isabella Sankey, the director of policy for Liberty, said: "No British court has ever been allowed to examine any evidence against Christopher Tappin or consider whether he should be tried here. Even if a US jury eventually finds him not guilty, he'll still spend years in a Texan jail awaiting trial, thousands of miles from his home and sick wife."

== Conviction and sentencing ==
On 1 November 2012, Tappin pleaded guilty in a federal court at El Paso, Texas, to selling weapons parts to Iran after reaching an agreement with prosecutors. Prosecutors said they would raise no objection to his serving the sentence in the UK.

On 9 January 2013, Tappin was given a 33-month prison sentence for arms dealing and fined US$11,357 (£7,095).

Between 8 March to 30 September 2013 he served his sentence at Federal Correctional Complex, Allenwood in Pennsylvania (as Federal Bureau of Prisons prisoner #90763-280) until his repatriation to HM Wandsworth.

== Return to the UK ==
On 28 September 2013, Tappin returned to the UK to serve his remaining 14-month sentence at the HM Wandsworth prison in South London. He was subsequently paroled from prison in May 2014, on condition that he wore an electronic monitoring tag on his ankle.

== Personal life ==
Tappin's wife of over 30 years, for whom he is the principal caregiver, suffers from chronic eosinophilic granulomatosis with polyangiitis. The couple have two children.

== See also ==
- Babar Ahmad
- David Carruthers
- Peter Dicks
- Gary McKinnon
- NatWest Three
- Richard O'Dwyer
- Syed Talha Ahsan
