= Syed Talha Ahsan =

British poet and translator

- Born: 21 September 1979 (age 47); London, United Kingdom
- Education: BA Arabic, SOAS University of London
- Occupations: Award winning poet and professional translator
- Awards: Koestler Trust platinum and bronze award
- Website: freetalha.org

Syed Talha Ahsan is a British poet and translator. He is winner of the Platinum and Bronze Koestler Awards 2012 for his poetry. He won the Koestler Award for his poem "Grieving". He is also the translator of a tenth-century Arabic poem, "Above the Dust", by Syrian Abu Firas al-Hamdani, on his captivity in Byzantium.

He was arrested at his family home in London, UK on 19 July 2006 in response to a request from the United States under the US–UK Extradition Act 2003, and detained without trial or charge over 6 years before his extradition to the United States on 5 October 2012. He spent another two years in detention in the US. He was accused of associations with an allegedly terrorism-related Islamic news media website and London-based publishing house from 1997 to 2004 about Bosnia, the Chechen Independence War and Afghanistan Islamic Emirate government. Noam Chomsky described the charges against Ahsan as shallow and evasive.

On 10 December 2013, in U.S. District Court in New Haven, Connecticut he entered into a plea bargain with the US Government prosecutor to charges of conspiracy to provide and providing material support for militants in Chechnya and Afghanistan. All other charges were dismissed. He returned to the UK, a free man, in August 2014. The length of Talha's detention without trial or charge is among the longest in British legal history.

The Talha Ahsan extradition case raised controversy due to comparison with the treatment of Gary McKinnon, whose extradition – which was expected to be 10 days after Ahsan's – was stalled after a medical diagnosis of Asperger syndrome and associative risks, similar to a diagnosis given to Ahsan. This has led to accusations from mainstream UK media, human rights NGOs and religious groups of a racist double standard within Conservative Home Secretary Theresa May's application of the law.

After being detained without trial for six years, with appeals to the European Court of Human Rights, the House of Lords and the UK High Court, Ahsan was extradited from the UK to the US on 5 October 2012, where he initially pleaded not guilty to all charges against him at a federal district court hearing in New Haven, Connecticut. He was held while awaiting trial in solitary confinement at the Northern Correctional Institution, a Supermax state prison in Somers, Connecticut, United States. His US trial proceedings began in October 2013. On 10 December 2013, he changed his plea to guilty to the charge of providing material support to terrorists. Connecticut chief judge, Janet C Hall sentenced him to time served and he returned to the UK in August 2014. In her judgment, Janet Hall, challenged the official narrative on his and Ahmad's cases.

When sentencing Ahsan (and Ahmad) on 16 July 2014, federal district Judge Janet Hall ruled that "nothing was done with the information" found in Ahmad's possession so, "the battle group document, besides showing that the Navy enlisted man was a traitor to his country, it also shows that Mr. Ahmad and Mr. Ahsan had absolutely no interest in operational terrorist actions that would harm the United States."

An international campaign led by Talha's brother Hamja Ahsan was formed to halt his extradition to the US and have him tried in the UK on the basis that this is where he was present during the period of the allegation. This was supported by a wide coalition of figures including Noam Chomsky, Robert Hillary King (Angola Three), A. L. Kennedy, Stop the War, Bruce Kent, Plaid Cymru, his MP and Labour cabinet member Sadiq Khan, Caroline Lucas MP, Gerry Conlon, the Muslim Council of Britain, actor Riz Ahmed, and former extradited Britons David Bermingham and Gary Mulgrew of the NatWest Three. The family-run campaign continues around issues of solitary confinement and reforming extradition law, with the aim of repatriating Talha to the UK. The campaign also curates events around prison literature, especially poetry.

The Free Talha Ahsan family campaign was short-listed for a Liberty Human Rights Award in 2013, described as a "creative and innovative campaign" and in its use of art, poetry, film and music to bring the issue of summary extradition to wider public and political attention described as "inspiring".

== Case background ==
Ahsan was a co-defendant with another British citizen Babar Ahmad, in a high-profile case at the European Court of Human Rights, appealing their extraditions to the US. They are accused by the US of terrorism-related offences arising from alleged involvement with a series of websites from the period of 1997 to 2004. One of the sites was for a short period located on a server within the United States. As a result of a UK parliamentary petition raising over 140,000 signatures the case sparked a discussion in the House of Commons among Members of Parliament late in 2011.

In a BBC interview aired on 5 April 2012 Evan Kohlmann an American internet extremism consultant, said of the websites to which the men were allegedly linked that "Even today there are very few websites out there that have the credibility that Azzam publications still has now." Kohlmann has been critically described as a ‘self-made’ Kohlmann has been critically described as a ‘self-made’ and a phony. His involvement in anti-Muslim networks has called into question his credibility on such issues, particularly after the Norwegian terrorist Anders Breivik, who was responsible for killing 77 young Norwegians in an attack fueled by anti-Muslim hatred, cited 25 pages from Kohlmann.

On 10 April 2012, the European Court of Human Rights published its landmark ruling that both men could be extradited from Britain to the US to face terrorism charges. They had three months from that date to request a referral to the Grand Chamber of the European Court of Human Rights. Syed Talha Ahsan denied any wrongdoing and asked to be tried in the United Kingdom.

He was extradited to the US in October 2012 alongside Ahmad and others who were wanted for different unrelated offences. The extradition was highly controversial and the then Home Secretary Theresa May came under heavy criticism both when the men were extradited and shortly afterwards when the extradition request from the US for Gary McKinnon was refused.

== Biography ==
=== Early life and education ===
Syed Talha Ahsan was born in London in 1979. He was educated at Dulwich College in Dulwich, London, England, United Kingdom. Syed Talha Ahsan has a first class honours degree in Arabic from SOAS University of London.

Following his arrest, he was diagnosed with Asperger syndrome (a form of autism).

=== Prior to detention ===
At the time of his arrest, Syed Talha Ahsan intended to become a librarian. Since his arrest he has been held in the UK in high security prisons without charge or trial and refused bail for over five years. While being incarcerated he continues to write highly praised poetry.

Early in 2006, the Metropolitan Police Service searched his family home under a warrant issued under the Crime (International Co-operation) Act 2003 and the Police and Criminal Evidence Act 1984. In July 2006, he was arrested in the UK under a provisional warrant and extradition proceedings commenced under the Extradition Act 2003.

Hearings in the UK to determine his suitability for extradition began in November 2006. On 14 June 2007 the UK Secretary of State ordered Syed Talha Ahsan's extradition. Consequently, an appeal was lodged by him to the UK High Court. It was refused on 10 April 2008. After his appeal to the House of Lords was rejected in May 2009 he then appealed to the European Court of Human Rights in Strasbourg. On 10 April 2012 the European Court approved his extradition and from that date he had 3 months in which to appeal the ruling to the Grand Chamber of the European Court of Human Rights.

== US indictment ==
The US indictment against Syed Talha Ahsan was lodged on 28 June 2006. In sum, it alleged that between 1997 and 2004 he, together with Babar Ahmad and other persons known and unknown: (i) conspired to provide material support to terrorists, knowing or intending that such support was to be used in furtherance of a conspiracy to kill, kidnap maim or injure persons or damage property in a foreign country and or to murder and attempt to murder US nationals abroad; (ii) provided and aided and abetted others to provide material support to terrorists, knowing or intending that such support would be used in furtherance of a conspiracy to kill, kidnap, maim or injure persons or damage property in a foreign country and or attempt to murder US nationals abroad; and (iii) conspired to kill, kidnap maim or injure persons or damage property in a foreign country. The US indictment goes on to allege that one of the means used by the co-conspirators to further the alleged criminal acts was an entity known as Azzam Publications, through which they operated a series of pro-jihad websites based in the United States that were specifically designed to incite readers to violent jihad and to provide material support to terrorist related entities including the Taliban, the Chechen Mujahideen and Al Qaeda.

== US extradition request ==
Syed Talha Ahsan was arrested at home on 19 July 2006 in response to an extradition request from the US under the Extradition Act 2003. He is accused in the US of terrorism-related offences arising out of his alleged involvement over the period 1997–2004 with a series of websites, hosted on a server in the United States. The key US case against Syed Talha Ahsan is based on evidence obtained by the Metropolitan Police during raids in London. After his extradition was approved by the district court it was sent to the Secretary of State for ratification in 2007 and only then was he granted assurances from the US government that he would not go to Guantanamo Bay nor be treated as an enemy combatant. Nonetheless, if extradited to the US and convicted it has been suggested that he could face a lifelong sentence without parole in a US high security prison.

== Syed Talha Ahsan's relationship to Babar Ahmad ==
Syed Talha Ahsan's case is closely related to the case of Babar Ahmad. As stated above, the Indictment against Syed Talha Ahsan alleges that the terrorist offences that he is accused of in the US were committed between 1997 and 2004 together with Babar Ahmad and others (known and unknown). Babar Ahmad was arrested in the UK on the authority of a provisional warrant and extradition proceedings in respect to him were commenced in 2004. Babar Ahmad's extradition was ordered in November 2005. His appeals to the High Court and the House of Lords were dismissed in 2006. Babar Ahmad appealed to the European Court of Human Rights in Strasbourg against his extradition. On 12 June 2007 the Strasbourg court indicated to the government of the United Kingdom that Ahmad could not be extradited until it had given due consideration to the matter. Although Syed Talha Ahsan was arrested two years later than Babar Ahmad, their cases were linked (together with four others) in a joint appeal to the European Court of Human Rights against their extradition to the US.

== Appeals in the UK against extradition to the US ==
Syed Talha Ahsan appealed the decision to extradite him to the US to the powers that be in the UK. In 2007 the Secretary of State made an order for his extradition. Syed Talha Ahsan brought a claim for a judicial review of what was said to be a decision of the Director of Public Prosecution not to discuss and consider with the prosecuting authorities in the US whether he should be tried in the United Kingdom for the crimes in respect of which his extradition was sought. His statutory appeal to the High Court of England and Wales was rejected together with his claim for a judicial review against the DPS in 2008.

His appeal to the House of Lords was rejected in May 2009.

== Appeal to the European Court of Human Rights ==
After exhausting the possibilities for legal redress in the UK courts, Syed Talha Ahsan appealed to the European Court of Human Rights together with five other men, three of whom are also British citizens: Babar Ahmad, Mustafa Kamal (Abu Hamza al Masri), Haroon Aswat, Adel Abdul Bary (an Egyptian citizen), and Khaled Al-Fawwaz, (a Saudi Arabian citizen). On 10 April 2012 the European Court of Human Rights published its decision to allow the extradition of the five men from Britain to the US to face terrorism charges, in spite of the evidence presented to the Court about the US prison system's treatment of terrorism cases in the United States Penitentiary, Florence ADX, in particular Muslims and psychologically disturbed prisoners, and the likelihood that if convicted the men would be placed under the controversial regime of solitary confinement not used in the UK. The five men had 3 months in which to appeal the European Court of Human Rights' ruling by requesting a referral to the Grand Chamber of the European Court of Human Rights.

The current UK Prime Minister, David Cameron (Conservative Party) and his Home Secretary Theresa May have welcomed the European Court of Human Rights' decision but the Deputy Prime Minister Nick Clegg (Liberal Democrat party) has expressed concern about the UK/US extradition treaty (2003) and has suggested that extradition cases such as Syed Talha Ahsan should be heard in the UK.

== Extradition to the U.S. ==
The legal extradition took place on the evening of 5 October 2012, when Syed Talha Ahsan was taken from HM Prison Long Lartin, to RAF Mildenhall in Suffolk, which is used by the US Air Force, from where he, Babar Ahmad and the three other suspects also wanted for extradition by the American authorities, were placed into the physical custody of the awaiting United States Marshals. They landed in Connecticut on the morning of 6 October.

== Solitary confinement in the United States ==
The case is a legal landmark because the European Court of Human Rights 10 April ruling stated that there would be no violation of Article 3 of the European Convention of Human Rights as a result of conditions at the United States Penitentiary, Florence ADX nor as a result of the length of the possible sentence. In opposition to the ruling, Juan Méndez, the UN Special Rapporteur on Torture, has stated that prolonged solitary confinement is unacceptable. "Long-term solitary confinement in any form is cruel and inhuman and should be recognised as a violation of the UN's Universal Declaration of Human Rights".

== US trial and conviction ==
On 6 October 2012, Talha Ahsan pleaded not guilty of conspiracy to support terrorists in Afghanistan and the Russian region of Chechnya in a Connecticut court. Later on 10 December 2013, in U.S. District Court in New Haven, Connecticut, he entered into a plea-bargain with the US Government prosecutor to charges of conspiracy to provide and providing material support for militants in Chechnya & Afghanistan. All other charges were dismissed. He was sentenced to 12.5 years in prison which was time already served.

== UK/US extradition treaty ==
The extradition treaty (2003) between Britain and the US, which came into effect in Britain at the start of 2004, allows people to be extradited to the US without any requirement for prima facie evidence to be presented in a British Court. The European Court of Human Rights ruling in the case of Syed Talha Ahsan and Babar Ahmad is a highly significant precedent and it has been reported as a step towards making extradition from the UK to the US easier in general.

In 2011 as a result of the huge response of over 140,000 signatures to an official government e- petition supporting the Babar Ahmad campaign against extradition the cases of Babar Ahmad, Syed Talha Ahsan and others were discussed in the House of Commons at Westminster parliament Subsequent to the parliamentary debate the BBC won permission from the High Court to televise an interview with Babar Ahmad in which he claimed that the extradition treaty is being used by the government of the United Kingdom to enable it to outsource its justice system to the United States.

In addition, Syed Talha Ahsan's lawyer Gareth Peirce has controversially alluded to the apparent role that the Extradition treaty may play in US/UK diplomacy:

it is meant to ensure that the law is duly applied rather than being a bartering tool in the 'US/UK special relationship'.

Other recent high-profile cases of British citizens subject to the UK Extradition Act 2003 include: Gary McKinnon; Richard O'Dwyer; Giles Darby, David Bermingham and Gary Mulgrew (the NatWest Three); and businessman Christopher Tappin.

== Asperger's syndrome ==
Syed Talha Ahsan has Asperger's syndrome which has caused him a history of difficulties since childhood. According to his lawyer, Gareth Peirce, this condition would make it extremely difficult or impossible for him to cope with the shocking change to his circumstances that extradition to the US would involve.

The Talha Ahsan extradition case raised controversy due to comparison with the treatment of Gary McKinnon, whose extradition – which was expected to be 10 days after Ahsan's – was stalled after a medical diagnosis of Asperger syndrome and associative risks, similar to a diagnosis given to Ahsan. This has led to accusations of double standards from mainstream UK media, Human Rights NGOs, Religious Organisations and Racial Equality Groups regarding the Home Secretary Theresa May's selective application of the law.

== Poetry and the media ==
Syed Talha Ahsan's poetry has been acclaimed by various well-known authors, such as A. L. Kennedy.

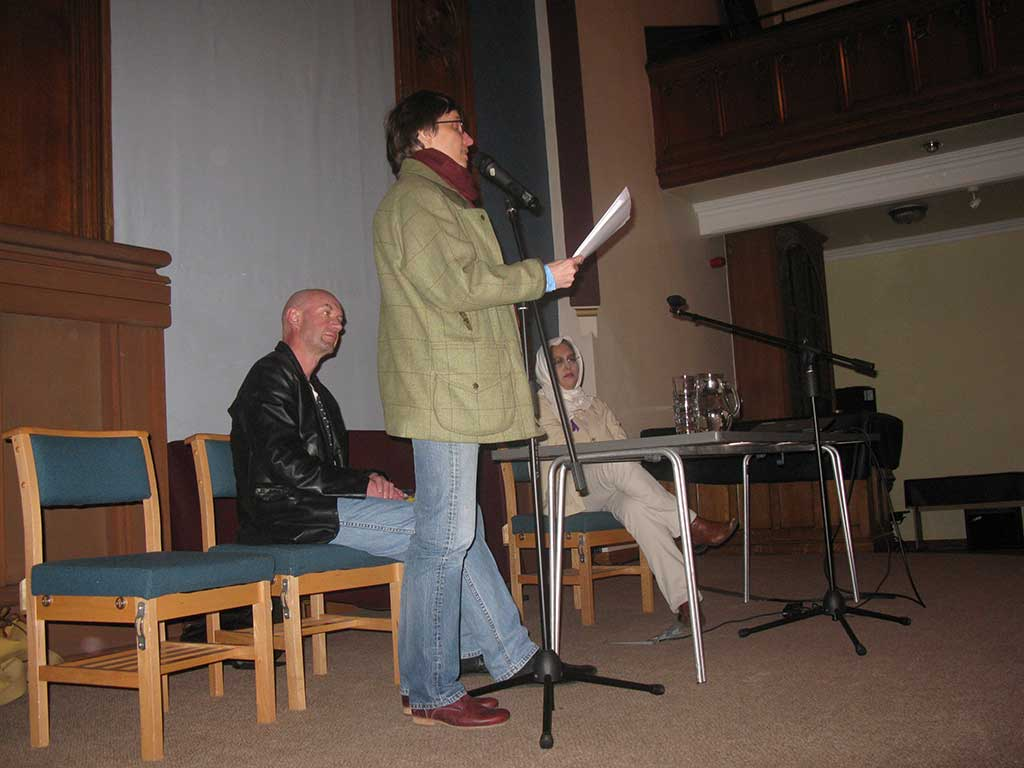
A. L. Kennedy reads Syed Talha Ahsan's poems in Edinburgh at the launch of Ahsan's poetry booklet in 2011 'This be the answer'

At the live poetry reading in Edinburgh in February 2011, (which can be viewed on Vimeo) a booklet of his poetry was jointly launched by the Muslim Women's Association of Edinburgh, Scotland Against Criminalising Communities and Radio Ramadan Edinburgh.

He is also the translator of a tenth-century Arabic poem, "Above the Dust", by Syrian Abu Firas Al-Hamdani, on his captivity in Byzantium.

In July 2011, an event at the Islamic Human Rights Commission took place in London to mark the fifth anniversary of Syed Talha Ahsan's imprisonment with contributions from his lawyer Gareth Peirce and veteran anti-war campaigner Bruce Kent. Actor Avaes Mohammed read a piece by Syed Talha Ahsan especially written for the occasion.

On 21 February 2013, Ian Patel of King's College London wrote a detailed piece in the New Statesman on The Impossible Injustice of Talha Ahsan's extradition and detention.

In his article for the Independent on 17 October 2012, Jerome Taylor quoted Boris Johnson exclaiming that "To extradite a man diagnosed with Asperger syndrome to America for trial would have been extraordinarily cruel and inhumane." in response to the news that the Home Secretary Theresa May had overturned the extradition of Gary McKinnon.

Taylor poses the question in his headline 'Why do politicians, celebrities and the media flock to Gary McKinnon's cause but stay silent about the likes of Talha Ahsan from Tooting? and concludes with the damning statement that the British Legal system is host to appalling and unjustified double standards.

== Extradition film ==
In April 2012, a documentary film titled Extradition about Talha Ahsan and his co-defendant in the extradition case Babar Ahmed was released, directed by independent British filmmaker Turab Shah. The film features interviews with Talha Ahsan's brother Hamja Ahsan, father Abu Ahsan, Babar father's Ashfaq Ahmad, their lawyer Gareth Peirce and Bruce Kent. Talha poems "Extradition" and "This be the Answer" is read by poet and playwright Avaes Mohammad. Filmmaker Ken Fero had editorial input in the final cut.

The film toured across the UK with a speakers and poetry tour organised by Talha brother's Hamja Ahsan. Speakers across the UK tour included Phil Shiner, Salma Yaqoob, Moazzam Begg, David Bermingham, Andy Worthington, Rizwaan Sabir, Tam Dean Burn, Tariq Mehmood, Peter Kallu, Pete Weatherby QC, A. L. Kennedy and Aamer Anwar. The film later broadcast internationally on Press TV and later put online in September 2012.

== See also ==
- Babar Ahmad
- Gary McKinnon
- the NatWest Three
- Richard O'Dwyer
- Gareth Pierce
