= LJM =

LJM can stand for:

- Lee Jae Myung, president of South Korea since 2025
- Limited Joint Mobility, a complication of diabetes
- Liberation and Justice Movement, a Darfur rebel group
- Liverpool John Moores University
- LJM (Lea Jeffrey Matthew), a company set up by former Enron CFO Andrew Fastow
