= List of acts of the Parliament of Victoria from 1877 =

This is a list of acts of the Parliament of Victoria, Australia for the year 1877.

== 1877 ==
The first session of the ninth parliament of Victoria.

Short title, or popular name	Citation	Royal assent
Long title
	41 Vict. No. 567	28 June 1877
An Act to extend the time for the Collection of Tolls.
	41 Vict. No. 568	17 July 1877
An Act to apply out of the Consolidated Revenue the sum of Seven hundred and ten thousand pounds to the service of the year One thousand eight hundred and seventy-seven and eight.
	41 Vict. No. 569	28 August 1877
An Act to sanction the issue and expenditure of certain sums from "The Public Works Loan Account 1872" for Salaries Wages and Contingencies for the service of the year ending the Thirtieth day of June One thousand eight hundred and seventy-eight.
	41 Vict. No. 570	28 August 1877
An Act to apply out of the Consolidated Revenue the sum of Seven hundred and fifty thousand pounds to the service of the year One thousand eight hundred and seventy-seven and eight.
	41 Vict. No. 571	11 October 1877
An Act to amend an Act intituled "An Act to amend the Law relating to Justices of the Peace and for other purposes." (Note: 40 Vict. No. 565)
Melbourne General Market Site Act 1877 (repealed)	41 Vict. No. 572	11 October 1877
An Act to enable certain Lands to be granted to the Corporation of the City of Melbourne for the establishment of a General Market in the said city and for other purposes. (Repealed by Queen Victoria Market Lands Act 1996 (No. 78 of 1996))
	41 Vict. No. 573	11 October 1877
An Act to further amend the "Local Government Act 1874." (Note: Local Government Act 1874 (38 Vict. No. 506)) (Repealed by Local Government Act 1890 (54 Vict. No. 1112))
	41 Vict. No. 574	11 October 1877
An Act to validate certain payments heretofore made out of moneys raised under the Public Works Loan Act of 1868, (Note: Public Works Loan Act 1868 (32 Vict. No. 332)) the Public Works Loan Act 1872, (Note: Public Works Loan Act 1872 (36 Vict. No. 428)) and the Railway Loan Act 1876. (Note: Railway Loan Act 1876 (39 Vict. No. 531))
Land Tax Act 1877 (repealed)	41 Vict. No. 575	11 October 1877
An Act to impose a Land Tax. (Repealed by Land Tax Act 1890 (54 Vict. No. 1107))
Parliamentary Costs Act 1877 (repealed)	41 Vict. No. 576	31 October 1877
An Act for awarding Costs in certain cases of Private Bills, and for the Taxation of Costs awarded by Committees of the Legislative Council and Legislative Assembly respectively. (Repealed by Constitution Act Amendment Act 1890 (54 Vict. No. 1075))
	41 Vict. No. 577	31 October 1877
An Act to vest land in the Mayor Councillors and Burgesses of the Borough of Brighton for purposes of Public Recreation.
	41 Vict. No. 578	31 October 1877
An Act to amend an Act intituled "An Act to provide for the Treatment and Cure of Inebriates." (Note: Inebriates Act 1872 (36 Vict. No. 449))
	41 Vict. No. 579	31 October 1877
An Act to apply out of the Consolidated Revenue the sum of Eight hundred thousand pounds to the service of the year One thousand eight hundred and seventy-seven and eight.
Railway Construction Act 1877	41 Vict. No. 580	31 October 1877
An Act to authorize the Construction of certain Lines of Railway by the State.
	41 Vict. No. 581	20 December 1877
An Act to give additional powers to The National Insurance Company of Australasia Limited.
Beechworth Waterworks Act Amending Act 1877	41 Vict. No. 582	20 December 1877
An Act to amend "The Beechworth Waterworks Act 1860." (Note: Beechworth Water Works Act 1860 (24 Vict. No. 105))
Regulation of Mines Statute 1877 (repealed)	41 Vict. No. 583	20 December 1877
An Act to provide for the Regulation and Inspection of Mines. (Repealed by Regulation of Mines and Mining Machinery Act 1883 (47 Vict. No. 783))
	41 Vict. No. 584	20 December 1877
An Act for the continuation of an expiring law.
	41 Vict. No. 585	20 December 1877
An Act to continue an expiring law.
Metropolitan Gas Company's Act 1878 (Note: Although given a short title ending '...Act 1878', this act was passed in the year 1877.) (repealed)	41 Vict. No. 586	20 December 1877
An Act to amalgamate The City of Melbourne Gas and Coke Company The Collingwood Fitzroy and District Gas and Coke Company and The South Melbourne Gas Company and to incorporate a company to be called "The Metropolitan Gas Company" and for other purposes. (Repealed by Legislation Reform (Repeals No. 3) Act 2008 (No. 53 of 2008))
Liverpool and London and Globe Insurance Company's Act 1877	41 Vict. No. 587	20 December 1877
An Act to enable the Liverpool and London and Globe Insurance Company to sue and be sued in the Colony of Victoria in the name of the Company and for other purposes.
Extradition Act of Victoria 1877	41 Vict. No. 588	20 December 1877
An Act to provide for the more convenient administration of "The Extradition Acts 1870 (Note: Extradition Act 1870 (33 & 34 Vict. c. 52 (Imp))) and 1873." (Note: Extradition Act 1873 (36 & 37 Vict. c. 60 (Imp)))
Waterworks Act Amendment Act 1877 (repealed)	41 Vict. No. 589	20 December 1877
An Act to extend the operation of "The Waterworks Act 1865" (Note: Waterworks Act 1865 (29 Vict. No. 288)) and for other purposes. (Repealed by Water Act 1890 (54 Vict. No. 1156))
Friendly Societies Act 1877 (repealed)	41 Vict. No. 590	20 December 1877
An Act to amend and consolidate the Laws relating to Friendly Societies. (Repealed by Friendly Societies Act 1890 (54 Vict. No. 1094))
	41 Vict. No. 591	20 December 1877
An Act to sanction the issue and application of certain Sums of Money from "The Railway Loan Liquidation and Construction Account" established under the provision of section forty-two of 33 Vict. No. 360. (Note: Land Act 1869 (33 Vict. No. 360))
Explosives Act 1877 (repealed)	41 Vict. No. 592	20 December 1877
An Act to amend the Law with respect to manufacturing, keeping, selling, carrying, and importing Gunpowder and other explosive substances. (Repealed by Explosives Act 1885 (49 Vict. No. 853))

== Sources ==
- "1877 Victorian Historical Acts". AustLII.
