= List of acts of the Legislative Council of Western Australia from 1877 =

This is a list of acts of the Legislative Council of Western Australia for the year 1877.

== 1877 ==
Short title, or popular name	Citation	Royal assent
Long title
Extradition Act, Western Australia 1877	41 Vict. No. 1	25 July 1877
An Act to provide for the more convenient administration of "The Extradition Acts, 1870 (Note: Extradition Act 1870 (33 & 34 Vict. c. 52 (Imp))) and 1873." (Note: Extradition Act 1873 (36 & 37 Vict. c. 60 (Imp)))
Road Parties Discipline Act 1877	41 Vict. No. 2	25 July 1877
An Act to make further provision for the maintenance of discipline among prisoners employed outside the walls of a prison.
District Roads Boards Audit Act 1877 (repealed)	41 Vict. No. 3	2 August 1877
An Act to make further provision for the audit of accounts of Local Road Boards. (Repealed by 42 Vict. No. 26)
Imported Stock Act 1876 Amendment Act 1877	41 Vict. No. 4	2 August 1877
An Act to amend "The Imported Stock Act, 1876." (Note: Imported Stock Act 1876 (40 Vict. No. 14))
	41 Vict. No. 5	6 August 1877
An Act to confirm the Expenditure for the services of the year One thousand eight hundred and seventy-six, beyond the grant for that year.
	41 Vict. No. 6	6 August 1877
An Act to provide for the enclosure of certain portions of certain streets in the Town of Fremantle.
Industrial Schools Act 1874 Amendment Act 1877	41 Vict. No. 7	6 August 1877
An Act to amend "The Industrial Schools Act, 1874." (Note: Industrial Schools Act 1874 (38 Vict. No. 11))
	41 Vict. No. 8	6 August 1877
An Act to repeal an Act intituled "An Act to prohibit the importation to, and use within the Colony of Western Australia, of certain Dangerous Matches." (Note: 40 Vict. No. 3)
	41 Vict. No. 9	10 August 1877
An Act to facilitate Leases and Sales of Settled Estates.
Pawnbrokers' Ordinance Amendment Act 1877	41 Vict. No. 10	10 August 1877
An Act to amend "The Pawnbroker's Ordinance, 1860." (Note: Pawnbrokers' Ordinance 1860 (24 Vict. No. 7))
Elementary Education Act 1871 Amendment Act 1877	41 Vict. No. 11	16 August 1877
An Act to further amend "The Elementary Education Act, 1871." (Note: Elementary Education Act 1871 (35 Vict. No. 14))
Telegraphic Messages Amendment Act 1877	41 Vict. No. 12	16 August 1877
An Act to amend and extend the "Telegraphic Messages Act, 1874." (Note: Telegraphic Messages Act 1874 (38 Vict. No. 6))
Scab in Sheep Ordinance 1866 Amendment Act 1877 (repealed)	41 Vict. No. 13	16 August 1877
An Act to amend "The Scab-in-Sheep Ordinance of 1866." (Note: Scab in Sheep Ordinance 1866 (30 Vict. No. 13)) (Repealed by Scab Act 1879 (43 Vict. No. 16))
	41 Vict. No. 14	16 August 1877
An Act to vest in certain Officers of Customs in this Colony certain powers which, by "The Merchant Shipping Act, 1871," (Note: Merchant Shipping Act 1871 (34 & 35 Vict. c. 110 (Imp)) are, in the United Kingdom, vested in the Board of Trade.
Ballot Act 1877	41 Vict. No. 15	16 August 1877
An Act to amend the law relating to Procedure at the election of Members to serve in the Legislative Council.
	41 Vict. No. 16	17 August 1877
An Act to amend "The Railways Act, 1873." (Note: Railways Act 1873 (37 Vict. No. 20))
Absconding Debtors Act 1877	41 Vict. No. 17	17 August 1877
An Act to repeal an Act intituled "An Act to facilitate the arrest of Absconding Debtors," (Note: 34 Vict. No. 27) and to make other provision in lieu thereof.
	41 Vict. No. 18	17 August 1877
An Act to amend the twenty-sixth section of "The Police Ordinance, 1861." (Note: Police Ordinance 1861 (25 Vict. No. 15))
	41 Vict. No. 19	17 August 1877
An Act to suspend the operation of "The Ballot Act, 1877." (Note: Ballot Act 1877 (41 Vict. No. 15))
	41 Vict. No. 20	17 August 1877
An Act to appropriate the sum of One Hundred and Fifty-one Thousand One Hundred and Fifteen Pounds Seven Shillings and Eightpence (Note: £151,115 7s 8d in 1877 is equivalent to A$23,800,000 in 2022.) out of the General Revenue of the Colony for the Service of the year One thousand eight hundred and seventy-eight.
	41 Vict. No. 21	7 May 1878 (Note: Royal assent delayed as the act was reserved for approval by Her Majesty, rather than by the governor.)
An Act to legalize the marriage of a Man with the Sister of his Deceased Wife.

== Sources ==
- "legislation.wa.gov.au".
