= Gary McKinnon =

Scottish computer hacker (born 1966)

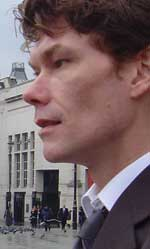
- McKinnon in 2006
- Born: February 1966 (age 60); Glasgow, Scotland
- Other name: Solo
- Known for: Computer hacking

Gary McKinnon (born February 1966) is a Scottish systems administrator and hacker who was accused by a US prosecutor in 2002 of perpetrating the "biggest military computer hack of all time". McKinnon said that he was looking for evidence of free energy suppression and a cover-up of UFO activity and other technologies potentially useful to the public. On 16 October 2012, after a series of legal proceedings in Britain, then Home Secretary Theresa May blocked extradition to the United States.

== Early life ==
McKinnon was born in February 1966 in Glasgow, Scotland. He became interested in computers at the age of 14, when he was given an Atari 400 console.

== Alleged crime ==
The US government accused McKinnon of hacking into 97 United States military and NASA computers over a 13-month period between February 2001 and March 2002, at the house of his girlfriend's aunt in London, using the name 'Solo'.

US authorities stated he deleted critical files from operating systems, which shut down the United States Army's Military District of Washington network of 2,000 computers for 24 hours. McKinnon also is alleged to have posted a notice on the military's website: "Your security is crap". After the September 11 attacks in 2001, he allegedly deleted weapons logs at the Earle Naval Weapons Station, rendering its network of 300 computers inoperable and paralyzing munitions supply deliveries for the US Navy's Atlantic Fleet. McKinnon was also accused of copying data, account files and passwords onto his own computer. US authorities stated that the cost of tracking and correcting the problems he caused was over $700,000.

While not admitting that it constituted evidence of destruction, McKinnon did admit leaving a threat on one computer:

US foreign policy is akin to Government-sponsored terrorism these days ... It was not a mistake that there was a huge security stand down on September 11 last year ... I am SOLO. I will continue to disrupt at the highest levels

US authorities stated that McKinnon was trying to downplay his own actions. A senior military officer at the Pentagon told The Sunday Telegraph:

US policy is to fight these attacks as strongly as possible. As a result of Mr McKinnon's actions, we suffered serious damage. This was not some harmless incident. He did very serious and deliberate damage to military and NASA computers and left silly and anti-America messages. All the evidence was that someone was staging a very serious attack on US computer systems.

== Arrest and legal proceedings ==
McKinnon was first interviewed by UK police on 19 March 2002 at the request of the US. He was interviewed again on 8 August 2002, this time by the UK National Hi-Tech Crime Unit (NHTCU).

In November 2002, McKinnon was indicted by a federal grand jury in the Eastern District of Virginia. The indictment contained seven counts of computer-related crime, each of which carried a potential ten-year jail sentence.

=== Extradition proceedings ===
McKinnon remained at liberty without restriction for three years until June 2005 (until after the UK enacted the Extradition Act 2003, which implemented the 2003 extradition treaty with the United States wherein the United States did not need to provide contestable evidence), when he became subject to bail conditions including a requirement to sign in at his local police station every evening and to remain at his home address at night.

If extradited to the US and charged, McKinnon would have faced up to 70 years in jail. He had also expressed fears that he could be sent to Guantanamo Bay.

=== Appeal to the House of Lords ===
Representing McKinnon in the House of Lords on 16 June 2008, barristers told the Law Lords that the prosecutors had said McKinnon faced a possible 8–10 years in jail per count if he contested the charges (there were seven counts) without any chance of repatriation, but only 37–46 months if he co-operated and went voluntarily to the United States. U.S.-style plea bargains are not a part of English jurisprudence (although it is standard practice to reduce the sentence by one-third for a defendant who pleads guilty).

McKinnon's barrister said that the Law Lords could deny extradition if there was an abuse of process: "If the United States wish to use the processes of English courts to secure the extradition of an alleged offender, then they must play by our rules."

The House of Lords rejected this argument, with the lead judgement (of Lord Brown of Eaton-under-Heywood) holding that "the difference between the American system and our own is not perhaps so stark as [McKinnon]'s argument suggests" and that extradition proceedings should "accommodate legal and cultural differences between the legal systems of the many foreign friendly states with whom the UK has entered into reciprocal extradition arrangements".

=== Further appeals ===
McKinnon appealed to the European Court of Human Rights, which briefly imposed a bar on the extradition.

On 23 January 2009, McKinnon won permission from the High Court to apply for a judicial review against his extradition. On 31 July 2009, the High Court announced that McKinnon had lost this appeal.

In August 2009, Gordon Brown attempted to negotiate a deal to allow McKinnon to serve in the UK any sentence he might receive in the US. The deal was rejected by the US government.

=== British government blocks extradition ===
On 16 October 2012, then-Home Secretary Theresa May announced to the House of Commons that the extradition had been blocked, saying that:

Mr McKinnon is accused of serious crimes. But there is also no doubt that he is seriously ill ... He has Asperger's syndrome, and suffers from depressive illness. Mr McKinnon's extradition would give rise to such a high risk of him ending his life that a decision to extradite would be incompatible with Mr McKinnon's human rights.

She stated that the Director of Public Prosecutions (DPP) would determine whether McKinnon should face trial before a British court. On 14 December, Keir Starmer, the DPP, and Mark Rowley, an Assistant Commissioner of the Metropolitan Police, announced that McKinnon would not be prosecuted in the United Kingdom, because of the difficulties involved in bringing a case against him and the likelihood he would be acquitted of any charge.

== Judicial review ==
In January 2010, Mr Justice Mitting granted McKinnon a further judicial review of the decision of Home Secretary Alan Johnson to allow McKinnon's extradition. Mitting distinguished two issues which were arguable, the first being whether psychiatrist Jeremy Turk's opinion that McKinnon would certainly commit suicide if extradited means that the Home Secretary must refuse extradition under section 6 of the Human Rights Act 1998 (which prevents a public authority from acting in a way incompatible with convention rights). The second was whether Turk's opinion was a fundamental change to the circumstances that the courts had previously considered and ruled upon. Mitting ruled that if the answer to both questions was "Yes", then it was arguable that it would be unlawful to allow the extradition.

== Support for McKinnon ==
In early November 2008, eighty British MPs signed an Early Day Motion calling for any custodial sentence imposed by an American court to be served in a prison in the UK. On 15 July 2009, many voted in Parliament against a review of the extradition treaty.

In November 2008, the rock group Marillion announced that it was ready to participate in a benefit concert in support of McKinnon's struggle to avoid extradition to United States. The organiser of the planned event was Ross Hemsworth, an English radio host. No date had been set as of November 2008. Many prominent individuals voiced support, including Sting, Trudie Styler, Julie Christie, David Gilmour, Graham Nash, Peter Gabriel, The Proclaimers, Bob Geldof, Chrissie Hynde, David Cameron, Boris Johnson, Stephen Fry, and Terry Waite. All proposed that, at least, he should be tried in the UK.

In August 2009, Glasgow newspaper The Herald reported that Scots entrepreneur Luke Heron would pay £100,000 towards McKinnon's legal costs in the event he was extradited to the US.

In a further article in The Herald, Joseph Gutheinz, Jr., a retired NASA Office of Inspector General Senior Special Agent, voiced his support for McKinnon. Gutheinz, who is also an American criminal defence attorney and former Member of the Texas Criminal Justice Advisory Committee on Offenders with Medical and Mental Impairments, said that he feared Gary McKinnon would not find justice in the US, because "the American judicial system turns a blind eye towards the needs of the mentally ill".

Web and print media across the UK were critical of the extradition.

Janis Sharp, McKinnon's mother, stood as an independent candidate in the 2010 general election in Blackburn in protest against the sitting Labour MP Jack Straw, who was Foreign Secretary when the extradition treaty was agreed. She finished last out of eight candidates with 0.38% of the vote.

On 20 July 2010, Tom Bradby, ITN's political editor, raised the Gary McKinnon issue with U.S. President Barack Obama and Prime Minister David Cameron in a joint White House press conference who responded that they had discussed it and were working to find an 'appropriate solution'.

=== Song ===
In August 2009, Pink Floyd's David Gilmour released an online single, "Chicago - Change the World", on which he sang and played guitar, bass and keyboards, to promote awareness of McKinnon's plight. A re-titled cover of the Graham Nash song "Chicago", it featured Chrissie Hynde and Bob Geldof, plus McKinnon himself. It was produced by long-time Pink Floyd collaborator Chris Thomas and was made with Nash's support.

== Statements to the media ==
McKinnon has admitted in many public statements that he obtained unauthorised access to computer systems in the United States including those mentioned in the United States indictment. He states his motivation, drawn from a statement made before the Washington Press Club on 9 May 2001 by the Disclosure Project, was to find evidence of UFOs, antigravity technology, and the suppression of "free energy", all of which he states to have proven through his actions.

In an interview televised on the BBC's Click programme, he stated of the Disclosure Project that "they are some very credible, relied-upon people, all saying yes, there is UFO technology, there's anti-gravity, there's free energy, and it's extraterrestrial in origin and [they've] captured spacecraft and reverse engineered it." He said he investigated a NASA photographic expert's claim that at the Johnson Space Center's Building 8, images were regularly cleaned of evidence of UFO craft, and confirmed this, comparing the raw originals with the "processed" images. He stated to have viewed a detailed image of "something not man-made" and "cigar shaped" floating above the northern hemisphere, and assuming his viewing would be undisrupted owing to the hour, he did not think of capturing the image because he was "bedazzled", and therefore did not think of securing it with the screen capture function in the software at the point when his connection was interrupted.

== Radio play ==
On 12 December 2007, BBC Radio 4 broadcast John Fletcher's 45-minute radio play about the case, entitled The McKinnon Extradition.

== See also ==
- 1980 Rendlesham Forest incident
- Adrian Lamo
- Babar Ahmad
- David Carruthers
- Peter Dicks
- Richard O'Dwyer
- Christopher Tappin
- Syed Talha Ahsan
- Lauri Love
- Julian Assange
- United Kingdom–United States relations
