= Russian Hell =

Islamist propaganda videos

Russian Hell (Arabic: جحيم الروس, romanized: jaḥīm ạl-rus), also called Russian Hell in Chechnya (Russian: Русский ад на Кавказе) is a series of jihadist propaganda videos. They were produced by Saudi Arabian militant Ibn Khattab in Chechnya, during the Second Chechen War and distributed by Azzam Publications in the United Kingdom. It depicts the torture and execution of Russian troops by Islamist militants. It was likely the first usage of a videotaped execution by jihadists, and has been utilized or viewed as inspiration by several Islamist terrorists and militants worldwide.

== Content ==
There are five such videos.

=== Russian Hell in the Year 2000 / Russian Hell 1 ===
The first Russian Hell video, also called Russian Hell in the Year 2000, was created by the group "The Islamic Army of the Caucasus". The video is about 2 hours long, and shows video from three separate operations. The film was shot by amateurs with no film training, and the footage is shaky and poorly zoomed in at several instances, with poor sound quality. It is presented in several fragmentary clips. The sound is instead replaced with a cappella music about fighting and dying for God. Only a few minutes of the video explain the background, while the rest is footage of the militant operations.

The videos showcase Ibn Khattab giving a sort of "mission brief" to the militants. Afterwards, they move to ambush and attack a convoy of Russian soldiers. It also displays the execution and torture of several Russian soldiers that they had captured. During the attack, they shout "Allahu Akbar". Otherwise they do not actually contain much theological material, other than "in the militants’ beards". The tone of the videos is largely optimistic, described as "almost cheery", and focuses on camaraderie between the militants. The film was sold by Azzam Publications in the United Kingdom as Russian Hell in the Year 2000.

=== Russian Hell 5 ===
Filmed in Chechnya and Uzbekistan, the film was first published in 2004 on the Islamic Awakening forum. Like Azzam Publications, the forum was hosted in the United Kingdom and had notable members including neo-Nazi David Myatt.

== History and usage ==
The videos were produced by Saudi militant Ibn Khattab in Chechnya, during the Second Chechen War. The purpose of the recording was to showcase the successes of Chechen militants, showcasing their training and ruthlessness towards their enemies. It was initially released as a forty-minute film in 2000. Shortly after its creation, al-Qaeda copied the idea and released their own film The Destruction of the Destroyer USS Cole, and afterwards many terrorist groups desired to document their "achievements" in such a manner. The content of the film is directly mimicked by the 2008 video The Blessed Dinsur Battle. Other videos mimicked its title, such as the 2006 video Hell of the Apostates in Somalia.

It was likely the first videotaped execution by jihadists. While produced in a Chechen context, it was popular among western jihadists, the most popular video of its kind. The video is further popular among militant extremist Muslims worldwide, including in South Asia, Australia, the Middle East and Indonesia.

The film was sold by Azzam Publications in the United Kingdom as Russian Hell in the Year 2000. Terrorist plotters Colleen LaRose and Momin Khawaja utilized the videos. The film was entered into evidence during the trial of former U.S. sailor Hassan Abujihaad. The film was viewed by the suicide bombers behind the 2003 Casablanca bombings the night before the attacks.
