= LJM (company) =

American company

LJM, which stands for Lea, Jeffrey, Matthew, the names of Andrew Fastow's wife and children, was a company created in 1999 by Enron Corporation's CFO, Andrew Fastow, to buy Enron's poorly performing assets and bolster Enron's financial statements by hiding its debts.

== LJM1 ==
In 1999, the early days of the Dot-com boom, Enron invested in a Broadband Internet start-up, Rhythms NetConnections. In a desire to hedge this substantial investment (they owned at one point 50% of Rhythms' stock) and several others, Fastow met with Kenneth Lay and Jeffrey Skilling on June 18 to discuss the establishment of an SPE called LJM Cayman L.P. (LJM1) that would perform specific hedging transactions with Enron. At a board meeting on June 28, Fastow announced that he would serve as the general partner and would invest $1 million. Also at this meeting, Fastow introduced the structure of LJM, stated he would collect certain "management fees", and got Lay to approve the partnership pursuant to Enron's Code of Conduct (Fastow's participation as the managing partner of LJM1 was not judged to "adversely affect the interests of Enron"). Later, Fastow raised $15 million and started LJM1 on its raison d'être, the Rhythms "hedge" (see below).

== LJM2 ==
In what was essentially the second version of the same idea, Fastow proposed in October 1999 to Enron's finance Board the creation of LJM2 Co-Investment L.P. Once again, Fastow would act as general director of a much larger private equity fund that would be funded with $200 million of institutional funds. Again, Fastow's dual roles as Enron's CFO and LJM2's general director were not seen as a conflict of interest by the board of directors and were easily laid aside.

== Illustrative transactions with LJM ==
=== Rhythms NetConnections ===
In March 1998, Enron invested $10 million for 5.4 million shares of Rhythms NetConnections, a then private broadband provider. After Rhythm went public, shares skyrocketed and Enron found itself with $300 million worth of Rhythm stock in May 1999. However, a lock-up agreement forced Enron to hold its shares for six months after the IPO. Owing to Enron's mark-to-market policy, Skilling's worries about Rhythm's volatility led to LJM1 carrying forth a convoluted transaction.

First, Enron transferred with severe locking restrictions 3.4 million shares of Enron stock worth $276 million at the time to LJM1 at a reduced price of $168 million. Then, LJM1 capitalized one of its subsidiaries, LJM Swap-Sub, with $80 million of its restricted shares and $3.75 million in cash. Finally, Swap-Sub placed a put option on 5.4 million shares of Rhythms stock owned by Enron. Under the option, Enron could require Swap-Sub to purchase the shares in June 2004 at $56 a share. Hence, Enron's stock price was now tied to Rhythms' stock price. If Enron's stock did well and Rhythms' sank, then Swap-Sub could reimburse Enron using its Enron shares and provide Enron a profit. More importantly, the deal allowed Enron to use this "trapped" value of the Rhythm put option to bolster its income statement and keep its stock price inflated.

However, unlike a true economic hedge that uses the equity of a direct competitor (in this case a direct competitor of Rhythms NetConnections), this "hedge" would fail disastrously if both Enron stock and Rhythms stock dropped. Despite this concern and the obvious conflict of interest involved in having Fastow run it, the accounting firm Arthur Andersen approved it.

In April 2000, owing to the decreasing value of Rhythms stock and a calculated 68% chance that the hedge would default, Enron unwound the transaction. As per agreement, Swap-Sub took from Enron its $207 million in Rhythms stock, but instead returned unrestricted Enron stock supposedly valued at $234 million. The Enron shares were, however, still under contractual restrictions and should have been devalued to around $161 million. Thus, Enron posted a slight profit instead of a true $70 million loss.

=== Cuiaba ===
In mid-1999, Enron owned a 65% stake in a Brazilian company, EPE, building a natural gas power plant in Cuiaba, Brazil. Additionally, the stake gave Enron the right to appoint 3 of the 4 directors in EPE's Board of Directors. The plant was having technical and environmental problems and Enron wanted to reduce its stake but had difficulty finding a buyer. Via a confusing and obscuring sequence of employees working for various subsidiaries, LJM1 "agreed" to purchase a 13% stake in EPE from Enron with the additional stipulation that LJM1 would gain control of one of Enron's 3 slots in EPE's Board.

Enron used the missing director (it now only had 2 of 4 seats on the Board) and its reduced stake (52%) to claim that it no longer controlled EPE and therefore did not have to consolidate EPE on its balance sheets. This move allowed Enron to mark-to-market a portion of a related gas contract and post a $65 million mark-to-market income for the second half of 1999. Later, Enron mysteriously bought back the stake for a loss of approximately $3 million, despite the fact that the plant's construction had bogged down even more in the intervening time.

=== ENA CLO ===
In December 1999, Enron North America (ENA) pooled a group of its loans receivable into a Trust (known as a collaterized loan obligation) and sold about $324 million of Notes and equity. The lower-rated tranches of these securities were found to be extremely difficult to sell, given that they were the last to be paid out of the Trust and hence the most likely to default. These notes, not surprisingly, were purchased by LJM2 for $32.4 million. Since the loans had now supposedly been sold off without any further recourse to Enron, this allowed Enron to claim that it was no longer subject to credit exposure - improving its financial statements. Later, when some of the loans began to default, Enron provided support to the CLO in a Rhythms-like move by giving it a put option on $113 million of its stock.

=== MEGS ===
On December 29, 1999, Enron sold a 90% stake in a company that owned a natural gas gathering system in the Gulf of Mexico to LJM2 for $25.6 million. Enron had been struggling to find a buyer by year's end in order to avoid consolidating the asset on its year-end 10-K. The transaction with LJM2 had apparently been intended to be temporary and towards this end as the contract allowed Enron the exclusive right to market LJM2's purchase to outside buyers for 90 days and capped LJM's return at 25%. Early reports indicated that the wells were performing above expectations and on March 9, 2000, Enron repurchased the stake from LJM2 for the maximum return to LJM2 possible. Jeff McMahon, Enron's then treasurer, initially refused to sign the agreement stating: "There were no economics run to demonstrate this investment makes sense. Therefore, we cannot opine on its marketability or ability to syndicate."

== Aftermath ==
Andrew Fastow's interest in LJM2 was purchased in 2001 and many of LJM1's and LJM2's "hedges" and the debt they caused would later be handled in part by another Enron vehicle, the Raptor SPEs. LJM, along with Chewco, played a major role in the downfall of Enron (see Timeline of the Enron scandal) and was the primary vehicle by which Fastow and others siphoned off at least $42 million while ruining Enron. Its debt-concealing transactions with Enron effectively pushed liabilities off balance sheets and led to Enron's perceived success.
