= Azzam Publications =

Publishing house based in London, United Kingdom

Azzam Publications was a publishing house based in London, United Kingdom. It was accused by authorities of being "part of a conspiracy to provide material support and communications links to people engaged in terrorism".

== History ==
After the death of Abdullah Yusuf Azzam, the publishers formed a group with the intent of publishing and spreading his militant ideology and related paramilitary manuals through print and Internet media.

Among the videos sold was the jihadist video Russian Hell, sold as Russian Hell in the Year 2000, which showcases the torture and execution of captured Russian soldiers.

The publishing house operated from a London post office box (Azzam Publications — BMC UHUD, LONDON, WC1N 3XX) and a website, www.azzam.com, that was shut down shortly after the September 11 attacks.

In October 2012, Babar Ahmad, the administrator of Azzam Publications, was extradited from the United Kingdom to the United States. In December 2013, he pleaded guilty to "conspiracy and providing material to support terrorism" in a New Haven, Connecticut court.
