= HM Prison Long Lartin =

Men's prison in Worcestershire, England

Coordinates: 52.1084°N 1.8535°W

HMP Long Lartin
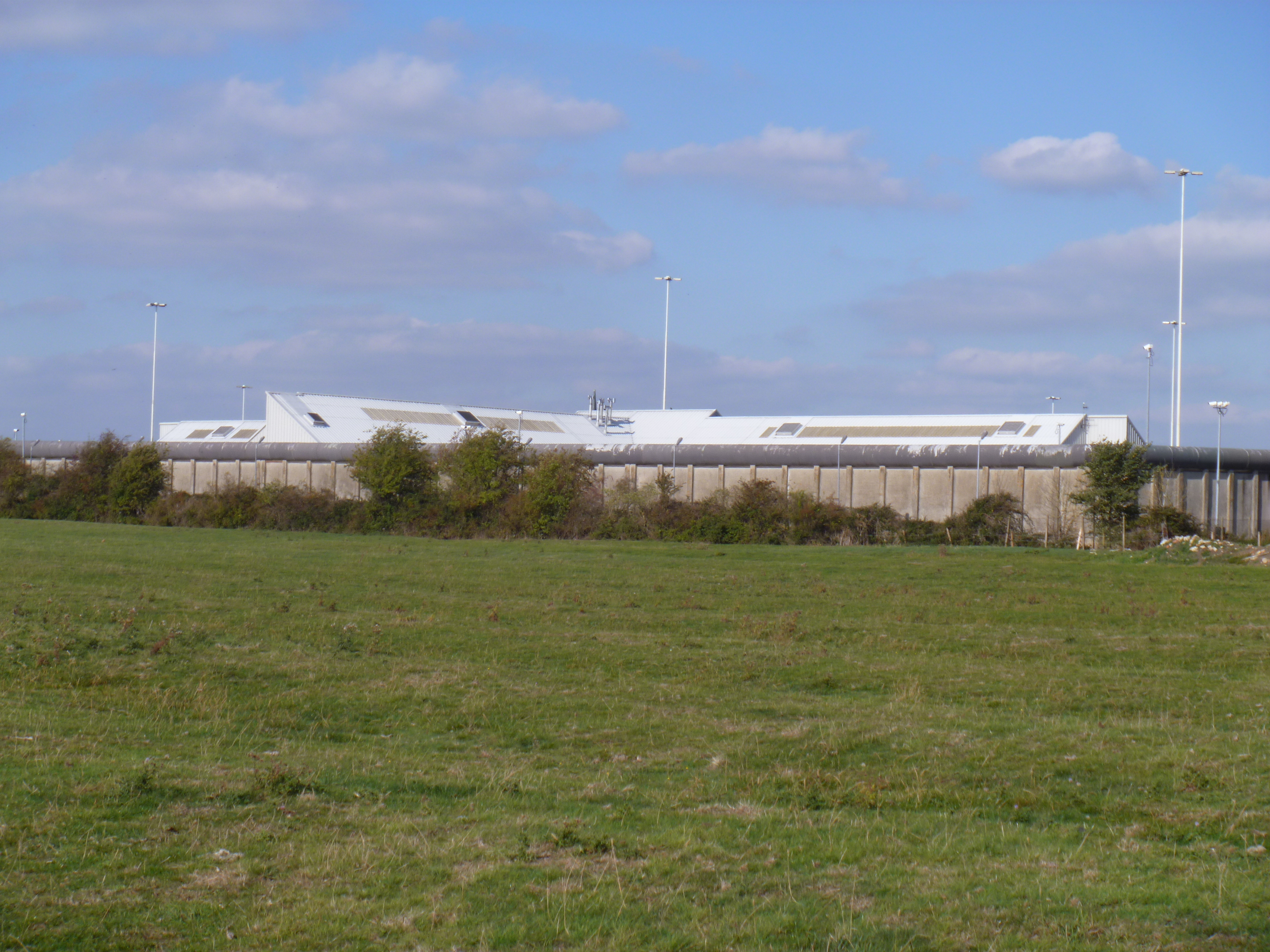
- Long Lartin Prison in 2011
- Interactive map of HMP Long Lartin
- Location: South Littleton, Worcestershire
- Security class: Adult Male/Category A
- Population: 500 (January 2022)
- Opened: 1971
- Managed by: HM Prison Services
- Governor: Babafemi Dada
- Website: Long Lartin at justice.gov.uk

HM Prison Long Lartin is a Category A men's prison, located in the village of South Littleton (near Evesham) in the Wychavon district in Worcestershire, England. It is operated by His Majesty's Prison Service.

== History ==
Long Lartin was opened as a Category C training prison in 1971, with additional security features and systems being added in 1972 to enable it to operate as a dispersal prison.

In April 1990, inmates at Long Lartin Prison attempted a mass breakout and, after officers foiled their escape bid, about 30 prisoners barricaded themselves on a landing. As a consequence of this and other security breaches, such as when inmate Gareth Connett was suspected of making a handgun in the metal workshop in August 1992, prison officers were drafted in from all around the country for a full stand down search in which many homemade weapons were found.

In August 1998, the then Governor of Long Lartin, Jim Mullen claimed that mentally ill inmates at the prison faced unacceptable delays before being transferred to appropriate secure hospital accommodation. Mullen stated that up to 20 of his 379 inmates should have been transferred, after a report by the Chief Inspector of Prisons called for action to speed up the movement of prisoners in need of specialist care.

A supermax segregation unit (the biggest in Europe) comprising a new residential wing called Perrie Wing was opened at Long Lartin in June 1999, designed to hold the most violent and dangerous offenders and substantially increasing capacity.

A November 2003 inspection report from Her Majesty's Chief Inspector of Prisons stated that the prison was generally safe and offered good staff-prisoner relations and reoffending work. However the report also cited serious deficiencies in areas such as race relations, the overloaded and understaffed drug treatment team, and too many prisoners being locked up instead of in work.

== The prison today ==
As of 2017, Long Lartin is a 992 capacity Category A prison.

There are eight main residential units. Two other residential units were demolished and the construction of a replacement purpose built two wing 180 house block has been completed.

On the evening of 11 October 2017, during a disturbance on E wing when 81 prisoners attacked staff with pool balls, staff had to retreat. Ten Tornado teams, prison officers equipped and trained to deal with riots, resolved the disorder. At the time, two-thirds of inmates were serving life sentences, and in common with other prisons Long Lartin had had staffing cuts of about 20%.

In January 2018, inspectors considered the prison stable and well controlled. In June 2018 there was a report that the prison's governor needed hospital treatment and spent weeks off work after a prisoner had attacked her. On 30 September 2018 a disturbance broke out and six prison officers were injured, of whom three had head injuries, two had suspected broken jaws and one had a fractured arm, according to the Prison Officers' Association. The disorder ended at around 17:30, seven prisoners were put into isolation and will be moved to other prisons.

In September 2019 a disturbance occurred involving ten prisoners who temporarily took over a wing. One prison officer needed hospital treatment and specialist riot-trained prison officers were sent in.

On 30 May 2025, a prison officer underwent emergency surgery after being stabbed during an incident at the prison.

== Notable inmates ==
Martin Evans of The Daily Telegraph described Long Lartin as one of the UK's "top security jails", and that the prisoners included "some of Britain's most notorious".

- Thomas Cashman, shot dead nine-year-old Olivia Pratt-Korbel at her home in Liverpool in August 2022.
- Jake Fahri, is serving a life sentence, serving a minimum term of 14 years for the murder of 16-year-old school boy Jimmy Mizen on 10 May 2008
- Ben Geen, a former nurse who since 2006 has been serving 30 years (17 concurrent life sentences) for 15 charges of grievous bodily harm and 2 of murder. He still claims to be innocent of all these crimes.
- Christopher Halliwell, who was convicted of murdering two women and is believed to have murdered more.
- Liam Lyburd, convicted for planning to commit a shooting at Newcastle College.
- Nathan Matthews, sentenced to life imprisonment with a minimum term of 33 years for the murder of Becky Watts.
- Jordan McSweeney, sexually assaulted and murdered Zara Aleena in June 2022.
- Vincent Tabak, sentenced to life imprisonment with a minimum term of 20 years in 2011 for the murder of Joanna Yeates.
- Steve Wright, serial killer who is serving a life sentence for the murder of five women in 2006.

=== Former inmates ===
- Babar Ahmad - convicted of terrorist offences in the United States. He was released in 2015 and returned to the United Kingdom.
- Subhan Anwar (deceased)
- Mark Dixie - convicted in 2008 in relation to the murder of Sally Anne Bowman. He was later convicted of rape in 2017.
- Abu Hamza (Mustapha Kamel Mustapha) (Serving a life sentence in the United States)
- Barry Horne - convicted of possessing explosives in 1991 and of arson in 1997.
- Erwin James - convicted in 1982 of murdering Angus Cochran, a solicitor. He was later released in August 2004.
- Charlie Kray, elder brother of Ronnie and Reggie Kray.
- Radislav Krstić (transferred to a prison in Piotrków Trybunalski, Poland)
- Ian McAteer - convicted of several offences over the span of 16 years, including murder and drug trafficking.
- Abu Qatada - accused of terrorist offences and deported to Jordan in 2013.
- Anthony Russell, spree killer and convicted rapist (moved to HM Prison Frankland)
- Charles Bronson - convicted of multiple offences over the span of 26 years, including robbery and grievous bodily harm.
- Frank Stagg - convicted in 1973 of criminal damage and conspiracy to commit arson. He later died in 1976 as a result of a hunger strike.
- John Straffen - convicted in 1951 of murdering three young girls. He was later moved to HM Prison Frankland, where he would die of natural causes in 2007.
- Sidonio Teixeira, who murdered his three-year-old daughter and received a life sentence in 2008. Beaten to death at the prison in 2016.
- Ian Watkins of former rock band Lostprophets. Jailed for 29 years after pleading guilty to 13 sexual offence charges, including attempted rape of a baby. Watkins was moved back to HMP Wakefield in 2018, where he would be stabbed to death October 2025.
