= Richard O'Dwyer =

British computer programmer

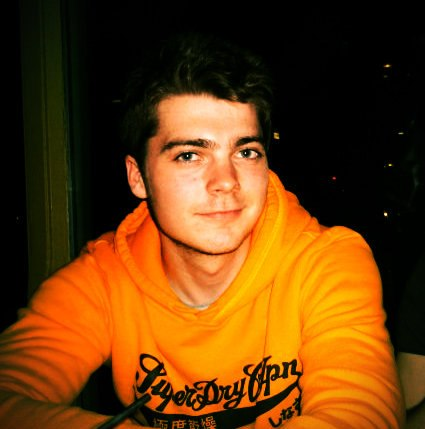
- O'Dwyer c. 2011
- Born: 5 May 1988 (age 38); Sheffield, England
- Education: Sheffield Hallam University
- Known for: TVShack website; U.S. extradition request
- Criminal charges: Conspiracy to commit copyright infringement; Criminal infringement of a copyright
- Criminal status: All charges dropped
- Website: www.richard.do

Richard O'Dwyer (born 5 May 1988) is a British entrepreneur & computer programmer who created the TVShack.net search engine while a student at Sheffield Hallam University.

In May 2011, the U.S. Justice Department sought to extradite O'Dwyer from the UK in relation to the website. The site did not host any infringing media, but American authorities said it contained indexed links to media hosted on other sites, and defined it as a "linking" website.

The Southern District Court in New York charged O'Dwyer with conspiracy to commit copyright infringement and criminal infringement of copyright. O'Dwyer's lawyer Ben Cooper opposed extradition, stating that the site acted as a mere conduit, and should be afforded the same protection given to search engines such as Google and Yahoo!. Ben Cooper also argued that any criminal prosecution should be brought in the UK, as TVShack was not hosted on American servers.

On 13 January 2012, UK District Judge Quentin Purdy rejected those arguments and ruled that O'Dwyer could be extradited to the U.S. to face copyright infringement allegations. The extradition order was approved by then UK Home Secretary Theresa May in March, 2012, and O'Dwyer launched an appeal.

On 28 November 2012, it was announced that O'Dwyer had signed a deferred prosecution agreement to avoid extradition. He was ordered to pay a fine of £20,000 and remain in contact with a US correctional officer over the next six months. In return, the United States would drop all charges.

Lord Thomas of Cwmgiedd, the judge, called the outcome "very satisfactory", adding, "It would be very nice for everyone if this was resolved happily before Christmas".

O'Dwyer now works as director of a computer software business and racing driver.

== TVShack ==
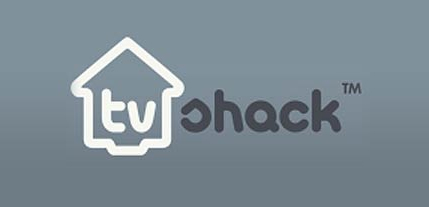
Official TV Shack Logo

While he was a student at Sheffield Hallam University, O'Dwyer created TVShack.net in December 2007.

The website contained indexed links for films, television, anime, music and documentaries. The site FAQ included the disclaimer: "TV Shack is a simple resource site. All content visible on this site is located at 3rd party websites. TV Shack is not responsible for any content linked to or referred from these pages." The MPAA considered TVShack.net a linking site that provided links to other sites hosting infringed content, while O'Dwyer and his supporters argued that the site was little different from a search engine, and would be legal under the Electronic Commerce Regulations 2002.

=== Domain seizure ===
As authorized by the court warrant for the domain seizure, visitors to TVShack.net are redirected to "a banner that advises them that the domain name has been seized by Order of the Court, in connection with criminal copyright violations. "

On 30 June 2010 U.S. Immigration and Customs Enforcement (ICE) officials seized seven domains for "violations of Federal criminal copyright infringement laws". This action was authorized by a warrant issued by the Manhattan Federal Court following a request by the U.S. Attorney for the Southern District of New York. The Manhattan U.S. Attorney's Office alleged that the seven websites engaged in "criminal copyright infringement" and were "involved in the illegal distribution of copyrighted movies and television programs over the Internet".

Besides O'Dwyer's TVShack.net, the other domains involved were Movies-Links.tv, FilesPump.com, Now-Movies.com, PlanetMoviez.com, ThePirateCity.org and ZML.com. TVShack was, along with five other websites, described as a "linking website", providing "access or links to other websites where pirated movies and television programs are stored". The seventh website, ZML.com, was described as a "cyberlocker".

The domain seizure was undertaken by the Complex Frauds and Asset Forfeiture Unit of ICE in partnership with the National Intellectual Property Rights Coordination Center. Assistant United States Attorneys Thomas G.A. Brown, Rebecca Rohr, Joseph Facciponti, Jason Hernandez, and Michael Ferrara, were in charge of the investigation. At the time Kevin Suh, Vice President of Content Protection for the Motion Picture Association of America (MPAA) said the domain seizure was the "largest takedown of illegal movie and television websites in a single action by the federal government."

Within four hours of the TVShack.net domain seizure, TVShack was moved to the TVShack.cc domain.

=== November seizure ===
In late November 2010, roughly five months after the initial seizure, a second operation saw a total of at least 82 domains seized by ICE. This included TVShack.cc.

O'Dwyer was visited by UK and U.S. police at this time, and some computer equipment was seized. O'Dwyer's mother said her son had shut down the website the next day.

== MPAA memo ==
On 5 August 2012, a leaked memo from the Motion Picture Association of America showed the MPAA's attempts to recruit "third party surrogates" to write news stories and blog posts to back their own interests. In the document they note the overwhelming support for O'Dwyer and that 95% of the public did not support the extradition, and also point out the difficulty of finding "allies" within the United Kingdom. The MPAA gave no comment on this strategic document leak.

== U.S. charges and extradition request ==
In May 2011 the U.S. Justice Department, through the London U.S. Embassy, asked for Richard O'Dwyer to be extradited to the U.S. under the Extradition Act 2003.

The extradition request was made after the Department of Justice had filed charges against O'Dwyer for criminal copyright infringement at the Southern District Court in New York. The two charges, conspiracy to commit copyright infringement and criminal infringement of copyright, each carry a maximum prison sentence of five years.

When the extradition request was made in May 2011, O'Dwyer spent one night in Wandsworth prison before arrangements were made for bail. On 14 June 2011, he appeared before Westminster Magistrates' Court for a preliminary hearing regarding the extradition request. O'Dwyer's barrister Ben Cooper opposed extradition and argued that any criminal prosecution should be brought in the UK, as TVShack was not hosted on American servers.

The hearing for the extradition was scheduled for 12 September. On 13 January 2012, a judge ruled that O'Dwyer can be extradited to U.S. to face copyright infringement allegations.

In February 2012, businessman Alki David offered to fund O'Dwyer's defence, in the event of his standing trial in the US. David Cook of Pannone Solicitors, who successfully represented defendants in some of the UK's leading cybercrime cases, also undertook to assist in the O'Dwyer case on a pro bono basis.

On 13 March 2012, Theresa May, the Home Secretary, approved the extradition of O'Dwyer to the United States. On 26 March, an appeal against the extradition was lodged on his behalf.

In June 2012 Wikipedia co-founder Jimmy Wales launched a campaign calling for the extradition to be stopped. He had also been supported by The Guardian newspaper, and others.

In November 2012, O'Dwyer agreed to a deferred prosecution agreement. The High Court in the UK was told that he would travel to the US voluntarily to complete the agreement, which would entail him paying a small sum in compensation and giving an undertaking not to infringe copyright laws again.

== Legal objections ==
=== Public opinion in the UK ===
A July 2012 poll conducted by YouGov showed that 9% of the UK population thought O'Dwyer should be extradited, 26% thought he should face charges in the UK, and 46% thought he should not face any criminal charges.

=== U.S. and UK copyright offences ===
According to the Open Rights Group UK citizens should not be subject to U.S. legal standards on copyright infringement.

Iain Connor from Pinsent Masons said, "It appears that U.S. copyright owners are seeking to rely on the Extradition Act and the U.S. case law to secure a prosecution for the authorisation of copyright infringement by the provision of links to infringing content. " He observed that "U.S. companies are likely to try and secure a conviction in the U.S. where they know that they could succeed on the basis of an offence of authorising copyright infringement", and that in the UK "the only case where this was looked at was the 'TV Links' case" where it had proved unsuccessful."

During the extradition hearings, the judge held that the offences alleged were also illegal under UK law. Whereas TV-Links was able to successfully argue it was a "mere conduit" under the EU Electronic Commerce Regulations 2002, aggregating content "they did not select or modify", O'Dwyer had exerted considerable control over the content hosted on TV-Shack, and therefore the allegations, if true, constituted a crime in the UK.

=== Jurisdiction ===
At the preliminary hearing for the extradition request, O'Dwyer's barrister argued that "the server was not based in the U.S. at all", and that "Mr O'Dwyer did not have copyrighted material on his website; he simply provided a link. The essential contention is that the correct forum for this trial is in fact here in Britain, where he was at all times."

Calling the extradition request for O'Dwyer "absurd", the Open Rights Group warned that lacking certainty about jurisdiction is "potentially opening an individual to dozens of prosecutions" for copyright infringement.

=== 2003 U.S.–UK extradition treaty ===
There has been criticism of the Extradition Act 2003 in the UK in respect of the cases of Gary McKinnon and the NatWest Three. In particular, the Act has been criticised for reducing the level of evidence required for extradition from the UK to the U.S. from prima facie evidence to "reasonable suspicion", and for allowing extradition to proceed on the basis of offences in U.S. rather than UK law. In addition, the standard of proof required for extradition from the U.S. to the UK is different, in accordance with the Fourth Amendment – the standard of "probable cause".

When in opposition the Conservatives and Liberal Democrats criticised the Extradition Act 2003 and in September 2010 Home Secretary Theresa May an independent review of all extradition arrangements was begun. The review, completed in September 2011, concluded that the "reasonable suspicion" and "probable cause" tests had "no significant difference", and that there was no imbalance in this respect. Moreover, the UK extradition procedure was found to be more elaborate, and more difficult to achieve, than that from the U.S. In respect of the NatWest Three, the report noted that the extradition evidence had been prepared according to the standards of the pre-2003 Treaty, and that was therefore no grounds to criticise the 2003 Treaty in respect of this case.

A forum bar amendment to the Extradition Act was included in the Police and Justice Act 2006, but has not been brought into effect. The unimplemented bar provision indicates that extradition would be barred if "a significant part of the conduct alleged to constitute the extradition offence is conduct in the United Kingdom" and "in view of that and all the other circumstances, it would not be in the interests of justice for the person to be tried for the offence in the requesting territory", taking into account "whether the relevant prosecution authorities in the United Kingdom have decided not to take proceedings against the person in respect of the conduct in question."

Civil liberties groups have called on the government to effect the forum clause into UK law in relation to the extradition request for Richard O'Dwyer, amid concerns over whether the U.S. courts are the appropriate legal forum. According to Liberty, "Enacting the forum amendment would have been quite simple. It's not that we're arguing that in every case where activity has taken place here we shouldn't allow people to be extradited. But we should at least be leaving our judges some discretion to look at the circumstances." According to Liberty, the forum clause would allow UK courts to "bar extradition in the interests of justice where conduct leading to an alleged offence has quite clearly taken place on British soil."

The 2011 extradition review, however, concluded that the forum bar clause "would require the judge to consider the evidence available to the requesting State and the evidence available to the domestic prosecution authorities. It would also require scrutiny of the prosecution decision making process", and that to do this would be "time consuming, costly and undermine the efficient and effective operation" of the Act.

== See also ==
- Gary McKinnon
- Hew Raymond Griffiths
- Kim Dotcom
- Syed Talha Ahsan
