= Rhythms NetConnections =

Former communication services company

- Industry: Broadband telecommunications
- Defunct: 2001
- Fate: Assets acquired by Worldcom
- Website: rhythms.com at the Wayback Machine (archived 2000-08-15)

Rhythms NetConnections Inc. (Former NASDAQ: RTHM) was in the business of providing broadband local-access communication services to large enterprises, telecommunications carriers and their internet service provider (ISP) affiliates and other ISPs. The company's services included a range of high-speed, always-on connections that were designed to offer customers both cost and performance advantages when accessing the Internet or private networks. The Company used multiple digital subscriber line (DSL) technologies to provide data transfer rates ranging from 128 kbit/s to 8.0 Mbit/s delivering data to the end user, and from 128 kbit/s to 1.5 Mbit/s receiving data from the end user. The company was delisted from NASDAQ in May 2001. On August 2, 2001, the company and all of its wholly owned United States subsidiaries voluntarily filed for reorganization under Chapter 11 of the United States Bankruptcy Code. Also in August 2001, the Company sent 31-day service termination letters to all of its customers.

== Lawsuit ==
A protracted class action securities lawsuit against the officers and directors of Rhythms NetConnections was settled on April 3, 2009. Judge John K. Lane of the U.S. District Court for the District of Colorado gave his final approval to a $17.5 million settlement. Judge Lane also awarded the plaintiffs' attorneys, Milberg LLP, Stull Stull & Brody and The Shuman Law Firm, 30% of the settlement fund and an additional $2.6 million in expenses from the fund.

A class of shareholders, who purchased shares in Rhythms NetConnections between Jan. 6, 2000, and April 2, 2001, brought the case. The lawsuit alleged that the officers and directors “knowingly or recklessly” made false statements about the company's subscriber line count, growth and financial condition in an effort to inflate its stock price.

At one time, Enron owned 5.4 million shares of Rhythms NetConnections stock.

== See also ==
- Covad Communications
- Dot-com bubble
- NorthPoint Communications
