= Babar Ahmad =

British Muslim (born 1974)

- Born: May 1974 (age 52); London, England
- Education: University of London
- Known for: Spent 11 years in prison Extradited to US; Awarded compensation by Metropolitan Police
- Website: https://babarahmad.com

Babar Ahmad; born London, England, May 1974) is a British Muslim of Pakistani descent who spent eight years in prison without trial in the United Kingdom from 2004 to 2012 fighting extradition to the United States. The US accused him of providing material support to terrorism via a website that he set up in the UK in 1996 to publish stories about the conflicts in Bosnia and Chechnya, but which in 2000–2001 allowed two articles to be posted offering support to the then Taliban government in Afghanistan. The US accepted that the website was operated from the UK but claimed jurisdiction because one of the servers hosting the website was located in the US. He fought a public eight-year legal battle, from prison, to be tried in Britain but the British Crown Prosecution Service concluded that there was "insufficient evidence to prosecute" him.

In 2009, the High Court in London awarded Ahmad £60,000 compensation after the London Metropolitan Police admitted that its officers had subjected him to "serious gratuitous prolonged unjustified violence" and "religious abuse" during his arrest which led to 73 injuries. It was revealed that the officers, who abused Ahmad were also accused of dozens of other assaults on black and Asian men but the four officers were acquitted by a jury in June 2011. In October 2015, a London High Court of Justice judge ruled that PC Mark Jones, one of the officers acquitted in the Ahmad case, assaulted and racially abused two Arab teenage boys in another case.

In 2011, celebrities and senior British lawyers backed a public campaign which led to 140,000 British citizens signing a UK Government e-petition calling for him to be tried in the UK. His case was subsequently debated twice in the British Parliament. Ahmad was finally extradited to the US in October 2012, having become the longest-serving British prisoner to be detained without trial in the UK. He spent the next two years of pre-trial detention in solitary confinement in Northern Correctional Institution, a Supermax prison in the US State of Connecticut. In December 2013, after his first year in solitary confinement and after being in prison for over nine years without trial, Ahmad pleaded guilty to two of the charges against him as part of a plea bargain that would allow him to return home within the year. He pleaded guilty to "conspiracy and providing material support to terrorism."

In July 2014, US federal Judge Janet Hall sentenced Ahmad to an unexpectedly lenient sentence of 12-and-a-half years in prison, meaning that with credit for time served he only had another 12 months to serve. Judge Hall concluded that Ahmad was never interested in terrorism, stating, "There was never any aid given by these defendants to effectuate a plot. By plot, I mean a terrorist plot ... Neither of these two defendants were interested in what is commonly known as terrorism ..." Hall stated that Ahmad "never supported or believed in or associated with Al-Qaida or Osama bin Laden." Ahmad was released in July 2015 and returned to the UK.

== Early life and education ==
Babar Ahmad was born and brought up in Tooting, London. His parents emigrated to Britain from Pakistan in 1963. His father worked as a Foreign Office civil servant for 30 years and his mother worked as a science teacher.

Ahmad was educated at Emanuel School, where he won academic prizes and obtained outstanding results in his GCSE and A-Level exams. He then attended university obtaining a master's degree in Engineering from the University of London in 1996.

== Before imprisonment ==
Ahmad fought on and off in the Bosnian War from 1992 until 1995. Before his imprisonment in August 2004, Ahmad was working in the IT department at Imperial College, University of London. In December 2003 Babar was arrested at his home in Tooting, South London. In March 2009, the London Metropolitan Police agreed to pay Ahmad £60,000 in damages after admitting he was subjected to "violent assault and religious abuse" during the arrest raid.

== US prosecution of Ahmad and extradition battle ==
Babar Ahmad was re-arrested in London on 5 August 2004 on charges of providing material support to terrorism. An affidavit filed with the US court detailed that Ahmad established Azzam.com, a website established in 1996 that later solicited support for Chechen insurgents and the Taliban regime in 2000/01. It further stated that items recovered from a house used by Ahmad included a floppy disk containing a detailed description of the movements of the US Fifth Fleet battlegroup. Ahmad was later indicted by a grand jury of US citizens in October 2004. Another man, Syed Talha Ahsan, was indicted in 2006 of involvement with Ahmad and with the battlegroup information in the document. In 2008, a US former navy seaman, Abu Jihad, was indicted and convicted of disclosing the classified information on the battlegroup but he was cleared of terrorism charges. However, when sentencing Ahmad on 16 July 2014, federal district Judge Janet Hall ruled that "nothing was done with the information" found in Ahmad's possession so, "the battle group document, besides showing that the Navy enlisted man was a traitor to his country, it also shows that Mr. Ahmad and Mr. Ahsan had absolutely no interest in operational terrorist actions that would harm the United States."

US extradition documents stated that "at all times material to the indictment" Babar Ahmad was resident in London. The Crown Prosecution Service declared in July 2004 and December 2006, as did the UK Attorney General Lord Goldsmith in September 2006, that there was "insufficient evidence" to charge Ahmad with any criminal offence under UK law.

Having been refused bail, Ahmad was detained in prison until his extradition on 5 October 2012. On 17 May 2005, Senior District Judge Timothy Workman approved his extradition at Bow Street Magistrates' Court, stating: "This is a troubling and difficult case. The defendant is a British citizen who is alleged to have committed offences which, if the evidence were available, could have been prosecuted in this country".

In September 2005, Sadiq Khan, Member of Parliament for Tooting, presented a petition of 18,000 signatures to the Home Secretary Charles Clarke asking for Babar Ahmad to be tried in the UK, instead of being extradited.

On 16 November 2005, Clarke approved his extradition to the United States.

On 28 November 2005, the UK Parliamentary Home Affairs Select Committee raised serious concerns about the one-sided UK-US extradition arrangements and, in particular, the case of Babar Ahmad.

In a House of Commons emergency debate on 12 July 2006 about UK-US extradition, MPs from all parties raised concerns at the case of Babar Ahmad. His name has also been mentioned repeatedly in both the House of Commons and the House of Lords in relation to UK-US extradition.

On 30 November 2006, Ahmad lost his appeal at the High Court. On 4 June 2007, the House of Lords refused to grant him leave to appeal to them.

On 10 June 2007, the European Court of Human Rights in Strasbourg (France) ordered the UK Government to freeze Babar Ahmad's extradition until they had fully determined his final appeal.

In 2009, the High Court in London awarded Ahmad £60,000 compensation after the London Metropolitan Police admitted that its officers had subjected him to "serious gratuitous prolonged unjustified violence" and "religious abuse" during his arrest which led to 73 injuries. It was revealed that the officers, who abused Ahmad were also accused of dozens of other assaults on black and Asian men. The revelation lead the Mayor of London Boris Johnson to order an independent review of the case. In 2010, the review led the Crown Prosecution Service to announce that four serving police officers would face criminal charges for assaulting Ahmad. The four officers were acquitted by a jury in June 2011. In October 2015, a London High Court of Justice judge ruled that PC Mark Jones, one of the officers acquitted in the Ahmad case, assaulted and racially abused two Arab teenage boys in another case. On 8 July 2010, the European Court of Human Rights of the Council of Europe, at Strasbourg, imposed a temporary stay on the extradition of Ahmad et al. to the United States to face terrorism charges, until the Court was satisfied that he would not be liable or subject inhumane treatment. The Court based its judgement on the European Convention on Human Rights, which is incorporated as the Human Rights Act 1998 in English and British law. In past cases, the ECtHR had ruled to prevent the United Kingdom and the British Government from deporting, extraditing or repatriating terrorism suspects to other countries, where they would be subject or liable to, or where there was a likelihood that they would be subject or liable to, torture, or to degrading or inhumane treatment.

In Babar Ahmad and Others v the United Kingdom the legal representatives of the litigants, argued that extradition to a country, where they might be imprisoned for life, with no possibility of release on parole, and where the penal regime is in comparison excessively harsh, amounted also to degrading or inhumane treatment, and that the extradition therefore ought to be refused.

On 22 June 2011, the Houses of Parliament Joint Committee on Human Rights urged the UK government to change the law so that Ahmad's perpetual threat of extradition is ended without further delay.

In November 2011, celebrities and senior British lawyers backed a public campaign which led to 140,000 British citizens signing a UK Government e-petition calling for him to be tried in the UK. His case was subsequently debated twice in the British Parliament.

On 10 April 2012, the European Court of Human Rights in Strasbourg (France) ruled that Ahmad could be extradited to the United States.

On 24 April 2012, the BBC reported the testimony of a British man convicted of plotting to blow up an aircraft, from the trial of Adis Medunjanin in New York City. Saajid Badat alleged that he was radicalised by Babar Ahmad but when sentencing Ahmad in July 2012, Judge Hall ruled, "As to whether he [Mr Ahmad] radicalized anyone, I don't understand that. I think that the only person radicalized in this case is the cooperating witness. It's pretty clear to me that Mr. Ahmad is not responsible for radicalizing him. He may have played a role in getting the cooperating witness to go to Afghanistan to get training, but even the cooperating witness acknowledges that, unlike what Mr. Ahmad wanted him to do, which was to return to England to complete his education, he turned away from that and was, in fact, radicalized by Khaled Sheikh Mohammed and Osama bin Laden whom he met in Afghanistan."

Ahmad was extradited from the UK to the United States on 5 October 2012. The removal process took place on the evening, when Babar Ahmad and Talha Ahsan were taken from HM Prison Long Lartin, to RAF Mildenhall in Suffolk, which is used by the US Air Force, from where he was placed into the physical custody of the awaiting United States officials. Three other terror suspects in unrelated cases were also extradited at the same time. Ahmad later stated that he was "blindfolded, shackled and forcibly stripped naked" during his extradition. He landed in Connecticut on the morning of 6 October.

After spending two years in solitary confinement at a US Supermax prison he pleaded guilty to "conspiracy and providing material to support to terrorism".

In 2014, US federal Judge Janet Hall sentenced Ahmad to an unexpectedly lenient sentence and concluded that Ahmad was never interested in terrorism, stating, "There was never any aid given by these defendants to effectuate a plot. By plot, I mean a terrorist plot ... Neither of these two defendants were interested in what is commonly known as terrorism ..." She described Ahmad as a "good person" who she believed posed no threat to the public and stated she had weighed the seriousness of his crime with his good character after reading thousands of letters of support and hearing from British prison officials who described him as an exemplary inmate. Judge Hall said "It appears to me that he [Babar] is a generous, thoughtful person who is funny and honest. He is well liked and humane and empathetic... This is a good person who does not and will not act in the future to harm other people."

In July 2015, Ahmad was released from prison in the US and returned to the UK. Upon his release he stated, "Eleven years of solitary confinement and isolation in ten different prisons has been an experience too profound to sum up in a few words here and now... In October 2012, I was blindfolded, shackled and forcibly stripped naked when I was extradited to the US." He added that "US and UK government officials" had treated him with respect after his release.

In March 2016, he told The Observer in his first press interview since his release that he was "wrong and naive" to advocate support for the Taliban government back in 2001.

== Police abuse case ==
Babar Ahmad was first arrested at his Tooting home on 2 December 2003 by UK anti-terrorist police of 1 Unit 1 Area Territorial Support Group based at the high security Paddington Green Police Station. By the time he arrived in the custody suite of the police station, he had sustained at least 73 injuries, all later documented by both police and independent doctors, as well as in photographic and video evidence.

He filed a formal complaint that was supervised by the Independent Police Complaints Commission (IPCC). He complained that officers had beaten him with fists and knees, stamped on his bare feet with boots, rubbed metal handcuffs on his forearm bones, sexually abused him, mocked the Islamic faith by placing him into the Muslim prayer position and taunting, "Where is your God now?", and applied life-threatening neck holds to him until he felt he was about to die. Officers denied the claims, saying Ahmad had battled like a "caged tiger" during his arrest, adding his injuries were either self-inflicted or caused by a legal tackle that took him to the ground when he was first detained.

On 10 September 2004, the Crown Prosecution Service announced that there was "insufficient evidence" to prosecute any of the police officers involved in the attack. However, on 17 January 2005 the IPCC declared that PC Roderick James-Bowen (born 1971) would face internal police disciplinary procedures over the alleged assault.

On 13 April 2005, PC James-Bowen was cleared at a Police misconduct tribunal held at Woolwich Crown Court. Metropolitan Police Commander Andre Baker, the president of the tribunal, stated that PC James-Bowen should be "commended, not castigated... for his great bravery" in arresting Ahmad.

On 18 March 2009, Babar Ahmad was awarded £60,000 compensation at the High Court in London after the Metropolitan Police Commissioner Sir Paul Stephenson admitted that he had been the victim of a "serious, gratuitous and prolonged attack" during the December 2003 raid on his house, which had resulted in 73 injuries.

On 26 March 2009, Mayor of London Boris Johnson announced an inquiry into the Babar Ahmad case with external judicial oversight by retired judge Sir Geoffrey Grigson, to report back to the Metropolitan Police Authority.-

On 3 November 2009, following his acquittal in a separate racial abuse trial, 42-year-old PC Mark Jones of 1 Area TSG was named as being involved with the attack on Babar Ahmad. The Director of Public Prosecutions, Keir Starmer QC, announced that he was taking the case "very seriously" while considering whether to prosecute PC Jones and the other officers involved in the alleged assault on Babar Ahmad.

In August 2010, it was announced that Police Constables Nigel Cowley, John Donohue, Roderick James-Bowen and Mark Jones would be prosecuted for their part in the alleged assault on Babar Ahmad. The trial began on Tuesday, 3 May 2011, at Southwark Crown Court, London. On 3 June 2011, they were found not guilty. The jury had not been informed of the 2009 police admission, nor the £60,000 compensation.

In October 2015, a London High Court of Justice judge ruled that PC Mark Jones, one of the officers acquitted in the Babar Ahmad case, assaulted and racially abused two Arab teenage boys in another case.

== Monitoring of MP visit to Ahmad ==
On 3 February 2008, the Sunday Times newspaper reported that UK anti-terrorist police had covertly bugged prison visits between Babar Ahmad and his local MP, Sadiq Khan, Member of Parliament for Tooting. The bugged conversations took place at Woodhill Prison in May 2005 and June 2006.

This information was reportedly leaked to the press by the police officer who had conducted the covert surveillance of the visits. The bugging allegedly contravened both legal privilege and the Wilson Doctrine that had outlawed surveillance of MPs in 1966. Following widespread international media coverage of the revelation, the then Secretary of State for Justice, Jack Straw MP, announced in Parliament that he had asked a retired High Court judge, Sir Christopher Rose, to conduct an official inquiry into the affair.

The Rose Inquiry reported back to the House of Commons later in February 2008, stating that the police had done nothing wrong, causing some commentators to dismiss the report and to criticise Rose for failing to interview the police officers who had bugged Khan.

== Sources ==
- "UK terror suspect Babar Ahmad returns home from US", 19 July 2015
- "The Ordeal of Babar Ahmad and Talha Ahsan", 19 July 2014
- "Jihad, justice and the American way: is this a model for fair terrorism trials?", 17 July 2014
- "Official Court Sentencing Transcript of United States vs Babar Ahmad, US District Court, District of Connecticut 3:04CR301(JCH), 16 July 2014
- "Babar Ahmad sentenced to 12.5 years for supporting Islamic terrorists", 16 July 2014
- "Hansard transcript of House of Commons debate on extradition", 5 December 2011
- "Hansard transcript of House of Commons Westminster Hall debate on extradition", 24 November 2011
- "High Court order of Metropolitan Police admitting abuse and offering compensation, 18 March 2009
