= Extradition Act 2003 =

Act of the Parliament of the United Kingdom

Extradition Act 2003 (Note: Section 227.)
- Act of Parliament
- Parliament of the United Kingdom
- Long title: An Act to make provision about extradition.
- Citation: 2003 c. 41
- Territorial extent: United Kingdom

Dates
- Royal assent: 20 November 2003
- Commencement: 1 January 2004 (Note: Section 221. The Extradition Act 2003 (Commencement and Savings) Order 2003 (SI 2003/3103).)
Other legislation
Amends	Bail Act 1976; Criminal Law Act 1977; Theft Act 1978; Computer Misuse Act 1990; Criminal Justice Act 1993; Criminal Procedure (Scotland) Act 1995; Access to Justice Act 1999; Terrorism Act 2000; International Criminal Court Act 2001
Repeals/revokes	Backing of Warrants (Republic of Ireland) Act 1965; Extradition Act 1989
Amended by	Constitutional Reform and Governance Act 2010; Anti-social Behaviour, Crime and Policing Act 2014; Sentencing Act 2020; Extradition (Provisional Arrest) Act 2020; European Union (Future Relationship) Act 2020

Status: Amended

Records of Parliamentary debate relating to the statute from Hansard, at TheyWorkForYou

Text of statute as originally enacted

Revised text of statute as amended

Extradition Act 1873 (Note: Section 1.)
- Act of Parliament
- Parliament of the United Kingdom
- Long title: An Act to amend the Extradition Act, 1870.
- Citation: 36 & 37 Vict. c. 60
- Territorial extent: United Kingdom

Dates
- Royal assent: 5 August 1873
- Commencement: 5 August 1873 (Note: The Acts of Parliament (Commencement) Act 1793.)
- Repealed: 31 January 2013
Other legislation
Amends	Extradition Act 1870
Amended by	Extradition Act 1895; Perjury Act 1911; False Oaths (Scotland) Act 1933; Statute Law Revision Act 1950; Sexual Offences Act 1956; Statute Law (Repeals) Act 1973; Extradition Act 1989
Repealed by	Statute Law (Repeals) Act 2013

Status: Repealed

Text of statute as originally enacted

Revised text of statute as amended

Extradition Act 1870
- Act of Parliament
- Parliament of the United Kingdom
- Long title: An Act for amending the Law relating to the Extradition of Criminals.
- Citation: 33 & 34 Vict. c. 52
- Territorial extent: United Kingdom

Dates
- Royal assent: 9 August 1870
- Commencement: 9 August 1870
- Repealed: 27 September 1989
Other legislation
Repeals/revokes	Extradition Act 1843; Extradition (No. 2) Act 1843; Extradition Act 1845; Extradition Act 1862; Extradition Act 1866
Amended by	Extradition Act 1873; Statute Law Revision Act 1883; Extradition Act 1895; Extradition Act 1906; Extradition Act 1932; Theft Act 1968; Misuse of Drugs Act 1971; Statute Law (Repeals) Act 1976; Protection of Children Act 1978; Child Abduction Act 1984; Prevention of Terrorism (Temporary Provisions) Act 1989
Repealed by	Extradition Act 1989

Status: Repealed

Text of statute as originally enacted

The Extradition Act 2003 (c. 41) is an act of the Parliament of the United Kingdom which regulates extradition requests by and to the United Kingdom. The act came into force on 1 January 2004. It transposed the European Arrest Warrant framework decision into British law and implemented the UK side of the controversial UK–US extradition treaty of 2003 before the treaty came into force in April 2007 after being ratified by the United States Senate in 2006.

== Provisions ==
The act is divided into five parts.

- Parts 1 and 2 deal with "category 1" and "category 2" territories respectively. While it is not mentioned in the Act, category 1 territories are all member states of the European Union and Part 1 of the Act is the United Kingdom's implementation of the European Arrest Warrant framework decision. Part 2 of the Act is concerned with extradition to all other countries which have an extradition treaty with the United Kingdom, such as the United States under the 2003 treaty.
- Part 3 deals with issuing European Arrest Warrants from the UK and extradition requests.
- Part 4 regulates powers of arrest, search and seizure regarding individuals subject to European Arrest Warrants and extradition warrants.
- Part 5 contains miscellaneous provisions including extradition to and from British overseas territories.

The procedure used by the courts is set down in the Criminal Procedure Rules 2015, part 50.

== Examination by Parliament ==
The act has been examined in two reviews by Parliament. The first in 2011 by Sir Scott Baker making a series of recommendations and the second examination by the House of Lords Extradition Law Committee in 2014.

As a result of campaigning and scrutiny by Parliament, several amendments were made in 2014 in the Anti-social Behaviour, Crime and Policing Act 2014. These included proportionality under section 21A and decision to try or charge under section 12A.

== Part 2 territories ==
Territories are designated as Category 2 territories both for the purposes of Part 2 of the Extradition Act, i.e. export extradition from the United Kingdom, and Part 3, i.e. import extradition to the United Kingdom.

These are the countries that the UK presently has extradition arrangements with:

- Albania
- Algeria
- Andorra
- Antigua and Barbuda
- Argentina
- Armenia
- Australia
- Azerbaijan
- The Bahamas
- Bangladesh
- Barbados
- Belize
- Bolivia
- Bosnia and Herzegovina
- Botswana
- Brazil
- Brunei
- Canada
- Chile
- Colombia
- Cook Islands
- Cuba
- Dominica
- Ecuador
- El Salvador
- Fiji
- The Gambia
- Georgia
- Ghana
- Grenada
- Guatemala
- Guyana
- Hong Kong Special Administrative Region
- Haiti
- Iceland
- India
- Iraq
- Israel
- Jamaica
- Kenya
- Kiribati
- Lesotho
- Liberia
- Libya
- Liechtenstein
- Macedonia
- Malawi
- Malaysia
- Maldives
- Mauritius
- Mexico
- Moldova
- Monaco
- Montenegro
- Nauru
- New Zealand
- Nicaragua
- Nigeria
- Norway
- Panama
- Papua New Guinea
- Paraguay
- Philippines
- Peru
- The Republic of Korea
- Russian Federation
- Saint Christopher and Nevis
- Saint Lucia
- Saint Vincent and the Grenadines
- San Marino
- Serbia
- Seychelles
- Sierra Leone
- Singapore
- Solomon Islands
- South Africa
- Sri Lanka
- Swaziland
- Switzerland
- Tanzania
- Thailand
- Tonga
- Trinidad and Tobago
- Turkey
- Tuvalu
- Uganda
- Ukraine
- United Arab Emirates
- Uruguay
- United States of America
- Vanuatu
- Western Samoa
- Zambia
- Zimbabwe

== Proposed reform ==
The 2003 UK-US treaty has been criticised for not applying the same test in both the United States and the United Kingdom, and changing this would require amending the act.
