= List of statutory instruments of the United Kingdom, 2014 =

This is a largely incomplete list of statutory instruments made in the United Kingdom in the year 2014.

== 1–100 ==
Number	Title
1	Taking Control of Goods (Fees) Regulations 2014
2	Local Government Finance Act 1988 (Non-Domestic Rating Multipliers) (England) Order 2014
3	Closure of Prisons Order 2014
4	Architects Act 1997 (Amendments etc.) Order 2014
5	Mobile Homes (Site Rules) (England) Regulations 2014
6	
7	Civil Legal Aid (Remuneration) (Amendment) Regulations 2014
8	Port Security (Port of Plymouth) Designation Order 2014
9	Stamp Duty and Stamp Duty Reserve Tax (European Central Counterparty N.V.) Regulations 2014
10	Pension Protection Fund and Occupational Pension Schemes (Levy Ceiling and Compensation Cap) Order 2014
11	Mobile Homes (Wales) Act 2013 (Commencement, Transitional and Saving Provisions) Order 2014 (Note: This Order was also implemented in Welsh as Gorchymyn Deddf Cartrefi Symudol (Cymru) 2013 (Cychwyn, Darpariaethau Trosiannol ac Arbed) 2014)
12	A5 Trunk Road (A505 Dunstable, Central Bedfordshire to A4146 Milton Keynes) (Temporary Restriction and Prohibition of Traffic) Order 2014
13	Air Navigation (Restriction of Flying) (Salthouse, Norfolk) Regulations 2014
14	Air Navigation (Restriction of Flying) (Salthouse, Norfolk) (Amendment) Regulations 2014
15	A30 Trunk Road (Monkton, Near Honiton, Devon) (Temporary Prohibition of Traffic) Order 2014
16	Collective Redundancies and Transfer of Undertakings (Protection of Employment) (Amendment) Regulations 2014
17	Lymington Harbour (Works) Revision Order 2014
18	Bromsgrove (Electoral Changes) Order 2014
19	Gedling (Electoral Changes) Order 2014
20	Herefordshire (Electoral Changes) Order 2014
21	Hambleton (Electoral Changes) Order 2014
22	Milton Keynes (Electoral Changes) Order 2014
23	South Oxfordshire (Electoral Changes) Order 2014
24	Vale of White Horse (Electoral Changes) Order 2014
25	Kensington and Chelsea (Electoral Changes) Order 2014
26	Warwick (Electoral Changes) Order 2014
27	Fenland (Electoral Changes) Order 2014
28	Air Navigation (Restriction of Flying) (Salthouse, Norfolk) (Amendment No. 2) Regulations 2014
29	A66 Trunk Road (Scotch Corner Roundabout) (Temporary Restriction and Prohibition of Traffic) Order 2014
30	A47 Trunk Road (Thickthorn Interchange) and A11 Trunk Road (Wymondham to Cringleford, Norfolk) (Temporary Restriction and Prohibition of Traffic) Order 2014
31	A14 Trunk Road (Junction 36 Nine Mile Hill, Cambridgeshire) Westbound Entry Slip Road (Temporary Prohibition of Traffic) Order 2014
32	A428 Trunk Road (Eltisley to Caxton Gibbet, Cambridgeshire) Eastbound (Temporary Prohibition of Traffic) Order 2014
33	A2 Trunk Road (Tollgate Junction – Pepper Hill Interchange) (Temporary 50 Miles Per Hour Speed Restriction) Order 2014
34	A55 Trunk Road (Junction 27, St Asaph, Denbighshire, Eastbound On Slip Road) (Temporary Prohibition of Vehicles, Cyclists and Pedestrians) Order 2014 (Note: This Order was also implemented in Welsh as Gorchymyn Cefnffordd yr A55 (Cyffordd 27, Llanelwy, Sir Ddinbych, Ffordd Ymuno tua'r Dwyrain) (Gwahardd Cerbydau, Beicwyr a Cherddwyr Dros Dro) 2014)
35	Billing Authorities (Anticipation of Precepts) (Amendment) (England) Regulations 2014
36	Air Navigation (Restriction of Flying) (Salthouse, Norfolk) (Revocation) Regulations 2014
37	M2 Motorway (Junctions 6 – 7) (Temporary Restriction and Prohibition of Traffic) Order 2014
38	M23 Motorway and the A23 Trunk Road (Junctions 11 – 10A, Northbound) (Temporary Restriction and Prohibition of Traffic) Order 2014
39	Health and Social Care Act 2012 (Commencement No. 7 and Transitory Provision) Order 2014
40	
41	Agricultural Holdings (Units of Production) (Wales) Order 2014 (Note: This Order was also implemented in Welsh as Gorchymyn Daliadau Amaethyddol (Unedau Cynhyrchu) (Cymru) 2014)
42	Education (Local Curriculum for Pupils in Key Stage 4) (Wales) (Amendment) Regulations 2014 (Note: This Order was also implemented in Welsh as Rheoliadau Addysg (Cwricwlwm Lleol ar gyfer Disgyblion yng Nghyfnod Allweddol 4) (Cymru) (Diwygio) 2014)
43	Non-Domestic Rating (Small Business Rate Relief) (England) (Amendment) Order 2014
44	Local Government Pension Scheme (Miscellaneous Amendments) Regulations 2014
45	Categories of Gaming Machine (Amendment) Regulations 2014
46	A3 Trunk Road (Painshill Interchange, Slip Roads) (Temporary Prohibition of Traffic) Order 2014
47	Machine Games Duty (Types of Machine) Order 2014
48	Building Societies (Accounts and Related Provisions) (Amendment) Regulations 2014
49	A19 Trunk Road (Stockton Road Interchange to Portrack Interchange) (Temporary Prohibition of Traffic) Order 2014
50	M25 Motorway and the A282 Trunk Road (Junctions 30 – 2) (Temporary Restriction and Prohibition of Traffic) Order 2014
51	A40 Trunk Road (M5 Junction 11) (Temporary Prohibition of Traffic) Order 2014
52	A303 Trunk Road (Eagle Cross, Near Buckland St Mary) (Temporary Prohibition of Traffic) Order 2014
53	A1 Trunk Road (Eighton Lodge Interchange to Seaton Burn Interchange) (Temporary Restriction and Prohibition of Traffic) Order 2014
54	M11 Motorway (Junctions 10 to 8) Southbound (Temporary Prohibition of Traffic) Order 2014
55	Statutory Sick Pay (Maintenance of Records) (Revocation) Regulations 2014
56	A14 Trunk Road (Junction 43 St Saviours Interchange to Junction 47 Woolpit Interchange, Suffolk) (Temporary Restriction and Prohibition of Traffic) Order 2014
57	M11 Motorway (Junction 11 to Junction 12, Cambridgeshire) (Temporary Restriction and Prohibition of Traffic) Order 2014
58	Building (Approved Inspectors etc.) (Amendment) (Wales) Regulations 2014 (Note: This Order was also implemented in Welsh as Rheoliadau Adeiladu (Arolygwyr Cymeradwy etc.) (Diwygio) (Cymru) 2014)
59	A303 Trunk Road (Upottery to Ilminster) (Temporary Prohibition of Traffic) Order 2014
60	A40 Trunk Road (Churcham, Gloucestershire) (Temporary Restriction of Traffic) Order 2014
61	M5 Motorway (Junctions 10–11) (Temporary Restriction and Prohibition of Traffic) Order 2014
62	M60 Motorway (Junctions 5–12, Clockwise and Anticlockwise Carriageways, Slip and Link Roads) (Temporary Prohibition and Restriction of Traffic) Order 2014
63	A1 Trunk Road (Catterick North Interchange) (Temporary Prohibition of Traffic) Order 2014
64	M1 Motorway (Junction 46) (Temporary Restriction and Prohibition of Traffic) Order 2014
65	A27 Trunk Road (A285) (Temple Bar Interchange) (Temporary Prohibition of Traffic) Order 2014
66	Council Tax Reduction Schemes (Prescribed Requirements and Default Scheme) (Wales) (Amendment) Regulations 2014 (Note: This Order was also implemented in Welsh as Rheoliadau Cynlluniau Gostyngiadau’r Dreth Gyngor (Gofynion Rhagnodedig a’r Cynllun Diofyn) (Cymru) (Diwygio) 2014)
67	A66 Trunk Road (Little Burdon Roundabout to Long Newton Interchange) (Temporary Restriction and Prohibition of Traffic) Order 2014
68	M606 Motorway (Junction 1) (Temporary Prohibition of Traffic) Order 2014
69	A1(M) Motorway (Junction 36, Warmsworth) (Temporary Prohibition of Traffic) Order 2014
70	A66 Trunk Road (Eaglescliffe Interchange to Yarm Road Interchange) (Temporary 50 Miles Per Hour Speed Restriction) Order 2014
71	M6 Motorway (Junctions 39–40 Northbound and Southbound Carriageways) (Temporary Restriction of Traffic) Order 2014
72	A5 & A494 Trunk Roads (Druid Junction, Druid, Denbighshire) (Temporary Traffic Prohibitions & Restrictions) Order 2014 (Note: This Order was also implemented in Welsh as Gorchymyn Cefnffyrdd yr A5 a’r A494 (Cyffordd y Ddwyryd, Y Ddwyryd, Sir Ddinbych) (Gwaharddiadau a Chyfyngiadau Traffig Dros Dro) 2014)
73	M18 Motorway (Junction 3, St. Catherines) (Temporary Prohibition of Traffic) Order 2014
74	A174 Trunk Road (Blue Bell Interchange and Stainton Interchange) (Temporary Prohibition of Traffic) Order 2014
75	A590 Trunk Road (Booths Roundabout to Swan Street, Ulverston) (Temporary Prohibition and Restriction of Traffic) Order 2014
76	Social Security (Graduated Retirement Benefit) (Married Same Sex Couples) Regulations 2014
77	Public Audit (Wales) Act 2013 (Consequential Amendments) Order 2014 (Note: This Order was also implemented in Welsh as Gorchymyn Deddf Archwilio Cyhoeddus (Cymru) 2013 (Diwygiadau Canlyniadol) 2014)
78	National Health Service Pension Scheme, Additional Voluntary Contributions, Compensation for Premature Retirement and Injury Benefits (Amendment) Regulations 2014
79	Police Pensions (Amendment) Regulations 2014
80	Education (Grants etc.) (Dance and Drama) (England) (Revocation) Regulations 2014
81	Road User Charging Schemes (Penalty Charges, Adjudication and Enforcement) (England) (Amendment) Regulations 2014
82	Port Security (Port of Medway) Designation Order 2014
83	M621 Motorway (Gildersome to Stourton) (Temporary Restriction and Prohibition of Traffic) Order 2014
84	A63 Trunk Road and the M62 Motorway (South Cave Interchange to North Cave Interchange) (Temporary Prohibition of Traffic) Order 2014
85	M6 Motorway (Junction 36 Northbound Entry and Exit Slip Roads) (Temporary Prohibition and Restriction of Traffic) Order 2014
86	M62 Motorway (Junction 29) (Temporary Prohibition of Traffic) Order 2014
87	M6 Motorway (Junction 26) (Orrell Interchange) and the M58 Motorway (Eastbound and Westbound) (Temporary Prohibition and Restriction of Traffic) Order 2014
88	Air Navigation (Restriction of Flying) (Duxford Aerodrome) Regulations 2014
89	Air Navigation (Restriction of Flying) (Stonehenge) Regulations 2014
90	Air Navigation (Restriction of Flying) (Wimbledon) Regulations 2014
91	National Health Service Commissioning Board and Clinical Commissioning Groups (Responsibilities and Standing Rules) (Amendment) Regulations 2014
92	Structural Funds (Welsh Ministers) Regulations 2014
93	Marriage (Same Sex Couples) Act 2013 (Commencement No. 2 and Transitional Provision) Order 2014
94	Electricity (Exemption from the Requirement for a Generation Licence) (Berry Burn) Order 2014
95	A21 Trunk Road (Morley's Interchange) (Temporary Prohibition of Traffic) Order 2014
96	Non-Domestic Rating (Rates Retention) (Amendment) Regulations 2014
97	A12 Trunk Road (Junction 22 Witham North Interchange, Essex) Southbound (Temporary Prohibition of Traffic) Order 2014
98	Non-Domestic Rating (Designated Areas) Regulations 2014
99	A2 Trunk Road (Brenley Corner Interchange – Thanington Interchange) (Temporary Restriction and Prohibition of Traffic) Order 2014
100	M20 Motorway and the A20 Trunk Road (Junctions 12 and 13, Slip Roads) (Temporary Prohibition of Traffic) Order 2014

== 101–200 ==
Number	Title
101	A259 Trunk Road (King Offa Way/De La Warr Road) (Temporary Prohibition of Traffic) Order 2014
102	A2 Trunk Road (Darenth Interchange, Westbound Link Road) (Temporary Restriction and Prohibition of Traffic) Order 2014
103	A21 Trunk Road (John's Cross Road) (Temporary Restriction and Prohibition of Traffic) Order 2014
104	M20 Motorway (Junctions 4 – 7) (Temporary Restriction and Prohibition of Traffic) Order 2014
105	Iran (European Union Financial Sanctions) (Amendment) Regulations 2014 (revoked)
106	Marriage of Same Sex Couples (Registration of Buildings and Appointment of Authorised Persons) Regulations 2014
107	Marriage (Same Sex Couples) Act 2013 (Consequential Provisions) Order 2014
108	A49 Trunk Road (Ashford Bowdler, Shropshire) (Temporary Prohibition of Traffic) Order 2014
109	National Health Service (General Medical Services Contracts) (Prescription of Drugs Etc.) (Wales) (Amendment) Regulations 2014 (Note: This Order was also implemented in Welsh as Rheoliadau’r Gwasanaeth Iechyd Gwladol (Contractau Gwasanaethau Meddygol Cyffredinol) (Rhagnodi Cyffuriau Etc.) (Cymru) (Diwygio) 2014)
110	Building (Amendment) (Wales) Regulations 2014 (Note: This Order was also implemented in Welsh as Rheoliadau Adeiladu (Diwygio) (Cymru) 2014)
111	A4042 Trunk Road (Mamhilad Roundabout to Court Farm Roundabout, Torfaen) (Temporary Traffic Restrictions & Prohibition) Order 2014 (Note: This Order was also implemented in Welsh as Gorchymyn Cefnffordd yr A4042 (Cylchfan Mamheilad i Gylchfan Court Farm, Torfaen) (Cyfyngiadau a Gwaharddiad Traffig Dros Dro) 2014)
112	Uplands Transitional Payment Regulations 2014
113	A5 and A5148 Trunk Roads (Muckley Corner to Weeford, Staffordshire) (Temporary Restriction and Prohibition of Traffic) Order 2014
114	A1 Trunk Road (Marston, Lincolnshire) (Temporary Prohibition of Traffic) Order 2014
115	M1 and M45 Motorways (M1 Junctions 18 to 16, Northamptonshire) (Temporary Restriction and Prohibition of Traffic) Order 2014
116	M1 Motorway (Junction 15 to Junction 14, Northamptonshire) (Temporary Restriction and Prohibition of Traffic) Order 2014
117	M5 Motorway (Junction 3, Quinton) (Temporary Prohibition of Traffic) Order 2014
118	The A500 Trunk Road (Porthill, Stoke-on-Trent) (Slip Road) (Temporary Prohibition of Traffic) Order 2014
119	M6 Motorway (Junction 4, Warwickshire) (Link Road) (Temporary Prohibition of Traffic) Order 2014
120	A52 Trunk Road (Wheatcroft, Nottinghamshire) (Temporary Prohibition of Traffic) Order 2014
121	A38 Trunk Road (Burton-On-Trent, Staffordshire) (Slip Roads) (Temporary Prohibition of Traffic) Order 2014
122	Council Tax (Demand Notices) (Wales)(Amendment) Regulations 2014 (Note: This Order was also implemented in Welsh as Rheoliadau’r Dreth Gyngor (Hysbysiadau Galw am Dalu) (Cymru) (Diwygio) 2014)
123	Infant Formula and Follow-on Formula (Wales) (Amendment) Regulations 2014 (Note: This Order was also implemented in Welsh as Rheoliadau Fformiwla Fabanod a Fformiwla Ddilynol (Cymru) (Diwygio) 2014)
124	Non-Domestic Rating (Multiplier) (Wales) Order 2014 (Note: This Order was also implemented in Welsh as Gorchymyn Ardrethu Annomestig (Lluosydd) (Cymru) 2014)
125	M50 Motorway (Junction 2 to 3) (Temporary Prohibition of Traffic) Order 2014
126	
127	
128	
129	
130	Costs in Criminal Cases (Legal Costs) (Exceptions) Regulations 2014
131	Civil Legal Aid (Merits Criteria) (Amendment) Regulations 2014
132	
133	
134	
135	
136	
137	
138	
139	
140	
141	
142	
143	
144	
145	
146	
147	
148	
149	
150	
151	
152	
153	
154	
155	
156	
157	
158	
159	
160	
161	
162	
163	
164	
165	
166	
167	
168	
169	
170	
171	A27 Trunk Road (Jarvis Road – Ford Roundabout) (Temporary Prohibition of Traffic) Order 2014
172	A259 Trunk Road (Martineau Lane– North Lane) (Temporary Restriction and Prohibition of Traffic) Order 2014
173	A45 Trunk Road (A45 Wellingborough, Northamptonshire) (Temporary Restriction and Prohibition of Traffic) Order 2014
174	A23 Trunk Road (Bolney Interchange – Hickstead Interchange) (Temporary Restriction and Prohibition of Traffic) Order 2014
175	HGV Road User Levy Act 2013 (Commencement No. 1) Order 2014
176	M4 Motorway (Junction 33 (Capel Llanilltern Interchange)) & The A4232 Trunk Road (Capel Llanilltern to Culverhouse Cross, Cardiff) (Temporary Traffic Prohibitions & Restrictions) Order 2014 (Note: This Order was also implemented in Welsh as Gorchymyn Traffordd yr M4 (Cyffordd 33 (Cyfnewidfa Capel Llanilltern)) a Chefnffordd yr A4232 (Capel Llanilltern i Groes Cwrlwys, Caerdydd) (Gwaharddiadau a Chyfyngiadau Traffig Dros Dro) 2014)
177	A494 Trunk Road (Bethel to Braich Ddu, Glan-yr-Afon, Gwynedd) (Temporary Traffic Prohibition and Restrictions) Order 2014 (Note: This Order was also implemented in Welsh as Gorchymyn Cefnffordd yr A494 (Bethel i Fraich Ddu, Glan-yr-afon, Gwynedd) (Gwaharddiad a Chyfyngiadau Traffig Dros Dro) 2014)
178	School Standards and Organisation (Wales) Act 2013 (Commencement No. 4 and Savings Provisions) Order 2014 (Note: This Order was also implemented in Welsh as Gorchymyn Deddf Safonau a Threfniadaeth Ysgolion (Cymru) 2013 (Cychwyn Rhif 4 a Darpariaethau Arbed) 2014)
179	A42 Trunk Road (Ashby-De-La-Zouch, Leicestershire) (Temporary Restriction and Prohibition of Traffic) Order 2014
180	A5 Trunk Road (Atherstone, Warwickshire) (Temporary Prohibition of Traffic) Order 2014
181	A46 Trunk Road (Wanlip, Leicestershire) (Temporary Prohibition of Traffic) Order 2014
182	First-tier Tribunal (Property Chamber) Fees (Amendment) Order 2014
183	Co-operative and Community Benefit Societies and Credit Unions Act 2010 (Commencement No. 2) Order 2014
184	Industrial and Provident Societies and Credit Unions (Electronic Communications) Order 2014
185	A5 Trunk Road (Tamworth, Staffordshire) (Slip Roads) (Temporary Prohibition of Traffic) Order 2014
186	A500 Trunk Road (A53 Etruria Road, Stoke-on-Trent) (Temporary Prohibition of Traffic) Order 2014
187	M54 Motorway (Junction 6) (Temporary Restriction and Prohibition of Traffic) Order 2014
188	A46 Trunk Road (Warwick Bypass) (Slip Road) (Temporary Prohibition of Traffic) Order 2014
189	A30 Trunk Road (Rawridge Hill, Near Honiton) (Temporary Restriction and Prohibition of Traffic) Order 2014
190	A1(M) Motorway (Junction 7 to Junction 9) (Temporary 50 Miles Per Hour Speed Restriction) Order 2014
191	A38 Trunk Road (Chudleigh Station Eastbound Exit Slip Road) (Temporary Prohibition of Traffic) Order 2014
192	A36 Trunk Road (Churchill Way North, Salisbury) (Temporary Prohibition of Traffic) Order 2014
193	A19 Trunk Road and the A66 Trunk Road (Stockton Road Interchange) (Temporary Prohibition of Traffic) Order 2014
194	
195	Olive Oil (Marketing Standards) Regulations 2014
196	St George's Healthcare National Health Service Trust (Transfer of Trust Property) Order 2014
197	A494 Trunk Road (Gwyddelwern, Denbighshire) (Temporary Traffic Restriction & Prohibitions) Order 2014 (Note: This Order was also implemented in Welsh as Gorchymyn Cefnffordd yr A494 (Gwyddelwern, Sir Ddinbych) (Cyfyngiad a Gwaharddiadau Traffig Dros Dro) 2014)
198	Protection of Freedoms Act 2012 (Guidance on the Making or Renewing of National Security Determinations) Order 2014
199	M1 Motorway (Junction 45 to Junction 46) (Temporary Restriction and Prohibition of Traffic) Order 2014
200	

== Other ==
- Clifton Suspension Bridge (Revision of Tolls) Order 2014 (SI 2014/926)
- Flexible Working Regulations 2014 (SI 2014/1398), which came into force on 30 June 2014.
- Petroleum (Consolidation) Regulations 2014 (SI 2014/1637)
- Equality Act 2010 (Equal Pay Audits) Regulations 2014 (SI 2014/2559), requiring an employment tribunal to order an employer to carry out an equal pay audit after a finding that there has been as equal pay breach.
- Tax Relief for Social Investments (Accreditation of Social Impact Contractor) Regulations 2014 (SI 2014/3066)

== See also ==
- List of acts of the Parliament of the United Kingdom from 2014
