= Jane Carlile =

Bookseller and freethinker

- Born: Jane Cousins; 1780/1781; Hampshire
- Died: 1843
- Occupation: Bookseller
- Known for: Imprisonment for publishing seditious libel
- Spouse: Richard Carlile (married 1813–32; separated)
- Children: Richard (1814–1854), Alfred (b. 1816), Thomas Paine (1818–1819), Thomas Paine (b. 1819), Hypatia (1822–1825)

Jane Carlile (née Cousins; 1780/81 – 1843) was a bookseller and freethinker, who was imprisoned alongside her husband Richard Carlile for the publication of a seditious libel.

== Life ==
Jane Cousins was born in Hampshire and of, according to Philip W. Martin, "poor origins". She married radical publisher Richard Carlile in Gosport, Hampshire in 1813. She was seven years his senior.

Following her husband's imprisonment in 1817, Jane took charge of the Fleet Street shop, continuing to sell radical works such as Sherwin’s Political Register, and Robert Southey's Wat Tyler. She was herself imprisoned in February 1821. The charge was a political one, following the printing of a letter from Richard Carlile in The Republican from 16 June 1820, in which he defended the right of personal assassination of tyrants. Jane was sentenced to two years, to be served alongside Richard in Dorchester Prison. Richard's sister, Mary Ann, took on the shop.

Jane gave birth to a daughter, Hypatia, in 1822, while in prison.

On separating from Carlile in 1832, Jane started her own bookshop.

== Legacy ==
Historians such as Nan Sloane have pointed out the challenges of excavating the real story of a figure like Jane Carlile, "whose life comes to us filtered through her husband." With others, like, Helen Rogers she has noted that defences such as Jane Carlile's (that she acted out of ‘conjugal duty’) has seen the actions of her and other radical women minimised. Carlile herself stated that her suffering under the law had led her to her own politicisation, and embrace of her husband's causes.

Of Jane Carlile's willingness to be prosecuted, G. D. H. Cole argued that:

It has often been said that Jane Carlile did this having no sympathy with her husband’s opinions, but feeling the call to stand by him in resistance to oppression. But this is definitely incorrect. There are writings of her own in the Republican and elsewhere, which decisively confute it. Jane Carlile did fully agree with her husband’s views, though not so fully with his intransigence in standing up for them. At this critical juncture she stood by him, and, being an excellent woman of business, ran the shop with considerable success, profiting by the large demand which the trials had produced for a type of publication which the Government and the Vice Society were uniting their best efforts to suppress.

Cole suggested that "the notion that Jane Carlile was not in sympathy with her husband’s views arose because they differed about tactics". Where "Carlile wished to go to all lengths in defying the law, by putting on sale again as quickly as possible all the works which had been condemned or seized by the authorities", Jane "or those on whose advice she acted, refrained from selling any work which had been explicitly condemned by a jury, while continuing to sell and issue other works of precisely the same character, as fast as printers could be got to produce them". Cole noted that Jane Carlile's comparative hesitancy likely helped to prevent an "immediate raid on the shop, and a seizure of the offending works", instead forcing the Society for the Suppression of Vice to "embark continually on fresh prosecutions". Arthur Calder-Marshall argued:

There seems no doubt to me that Jane Carlile was fully in accord with her husband at this stage of their careers, though it is possible that she was more pleased at the financial improvement of their fortunes than with his tactics. Even so she was a loyal and active partner.
