= HM Prison The Verne =

Men's prison in Dorset, England

HMP The Verne
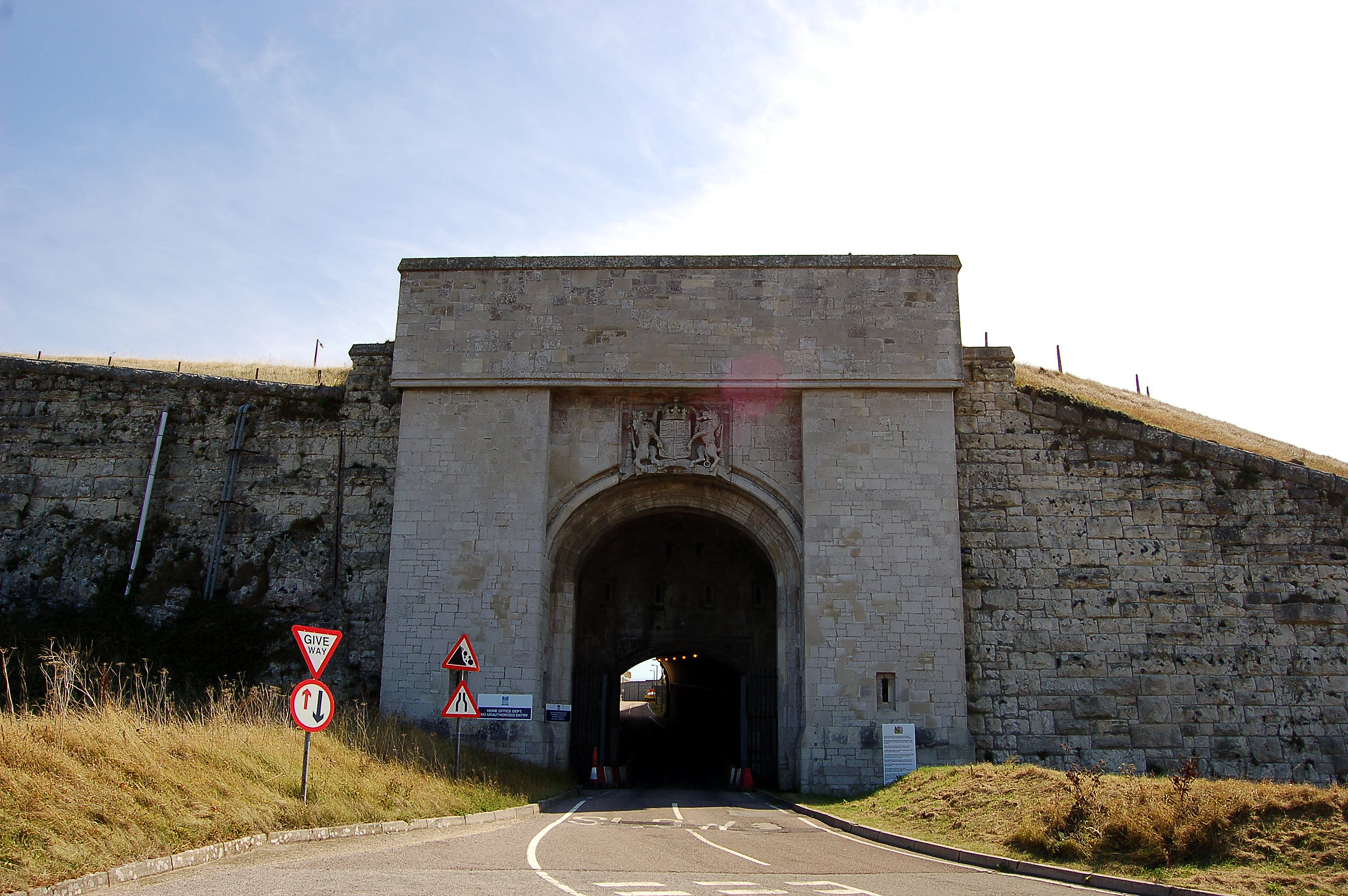
- Built on the highest point of Portland, the Verne is surrounded by cliffs and a moat, with two entrances – one via a footbridge and one via this tunnel
- Interactive map of HMP The Verne
- Location: Tophill, Portland, Dorset; 50.5621°N 2.4358°W
- Security class: Adult Male/Category C
- Opened: 1949, 2018
- Closed: 2014
- Managed by: HM Prison Services
- Governor: David Bourne
- Website: The Verne at justice.gov.uk

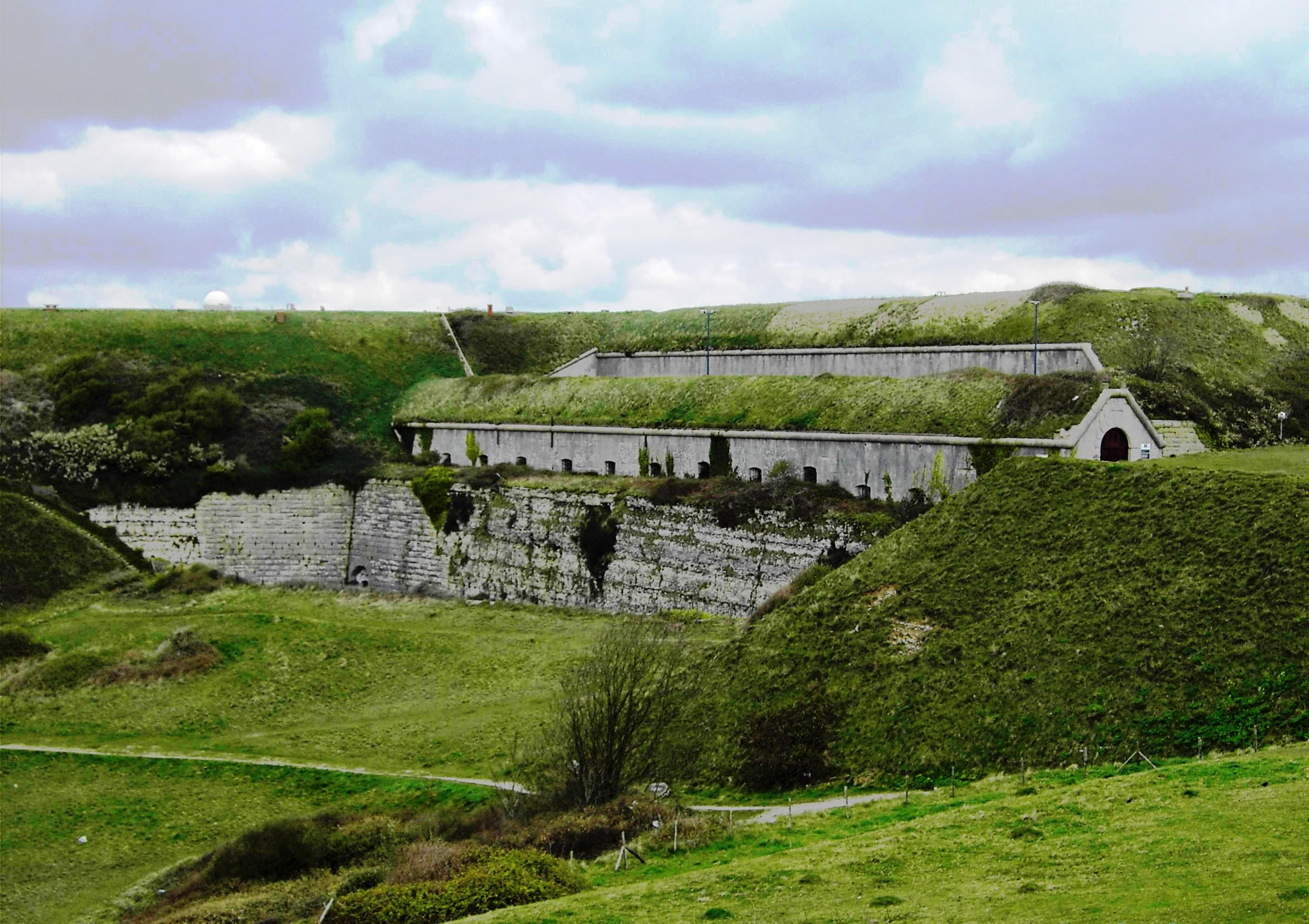
View of the moat and western cliff from the south west.

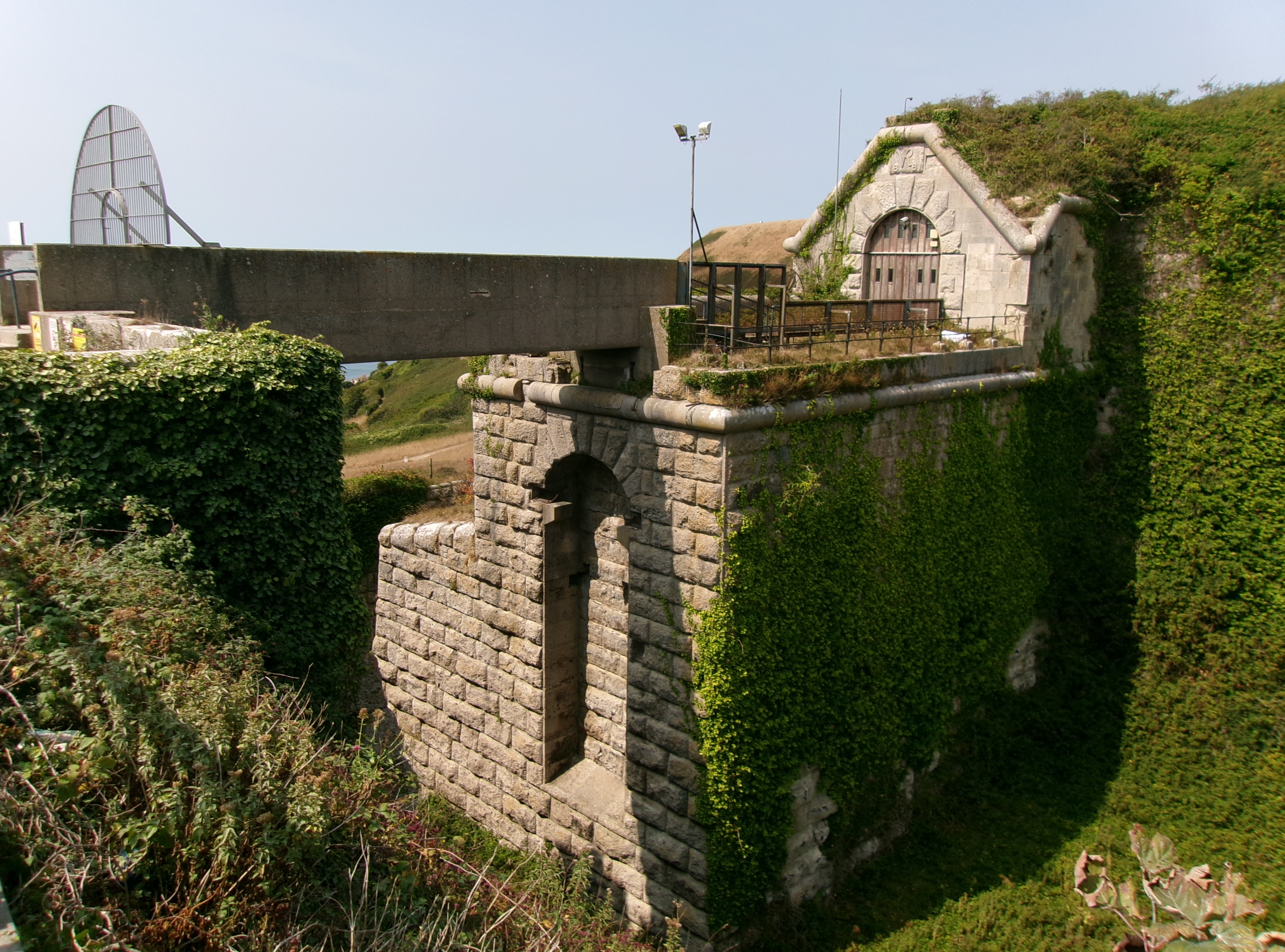
Southern entrance

HM Prison The Verne is a Category C men's prison located within the 19th-century Verne Citadel on the Isle of Portland in Dorset, England. Operated by His Majesty's Prison Service, HMP The Verne was established in 1949 and occupies the southern part of the citadel. After a brief spell as an Immigration Removal Centre in 2014–2017, HMP The Verne re-opened in 2018.

== History ==
HMP The Verne opened in 1949 within the Verne Citadel, which had been designed by Captain W. Crossman of the Royal Engineers and built between 1857 and 1881 to defend Portland Harbour. The new prison received its first inmates on 1 February 1949 with the arrival of an advance party of 20 prisoners. Since becoming established, the interior of the prison has been substantially rebuilt by prison labour, and the modern prison, a Category C prison for adult males, has gained a considerable training programme for its prisoners who are serving either medium- or long-term sentences, including life sentences.

On 4 September 2013, the Ministry of Justice announced the decision to convert the prison into an immigration removal centre for 600 detainees awaiting deportation. The prison closed in November 2013, with all prisoners being transferred to other suitable prisons, and work to change the function of the prison began immediately. The prison was officially closed in January 2014 by the Closure of Prisons Order 2014. The planned re-role came as part of a wider programme to modernise the prison estate, and the nearby HM Prison Dorchester closed soon after, in December 2013.

With a set opening date in February 2014, it was later announced in March 2014 that the immigration removal centre plans were officially put on hold until September. However, the Prison Service announced that the empty prison would still begin to take on immigration detainees that month and would still remain known as HMP The Verne. It began holding detainees from 24 March 2014. IRC The Verne reverted to a prison in 2018. The prison is currently used to house sex offenders.

== Inspection reports ==
The Verne was an open-style prison with walls, but work has been undertaken in recent years to strengthen the perimeter. It has been praised as an effective jail, but various aspects of its work have come under criticism.

In November 2005, an inspection report from Her Majesty's Chief Inspector of Prisons criticised The Verne for weaknesses in its anti-bullying and suicide prevention policies. The report stated that safety at the prison had "deteriorated significantly" since its last inspection and that the needs of foreign national prisoners were not being met. However, the report said that the prison had made progress in improving its training provision for inmates, and work to prepare prisoners for release had also improved.

During 2008, the prison was criticised to such an extent for not meeting the needs of inmates that Chief Inspector of Prisons Anne Owers believed the best option would be to turn it into a centre exclusively for foreign prisoners. However, in recent years, the prison had been praised as an effective prison which needed to develop better employment and resettlement opportunities. The inspectors found that there were low levels of violence, good staff-prisoner relationships, and that the Jailhouse Café, a public cafe offering work experience to prisoners, was a successful social enterprise.

== Notable inmates ==
Glam rock star Gary Glitter, who was sentenced to 16 years in prison for sexual offences, was incarcerated at The Verne until his release on licence in February 2023. However, Glitter was recalled to prison for violating his license conditions a month later. John Patrick Hannan was also sentenced to serve time at the prison but, after a 1955 escape, has set the world record for the duration of any inmate to remain a fugitive.
