= 2011 Warwick District Council election =

2011 UK local government election

← 2007	5 May 2011	2015 →

All 46 seats to Warwick District Council 24 seats needed for a majority

	First party	Second party	Third party
Party	Conservative	Liberal Democrats	Labour
Seats won	25	9	8
Seat change	▲1	Steady	▼1
Popular vote	45,940	21,246	29,478
Percentage	39.5%	18.3%	25.4%
	Fourth party	Fifth party
Party	Whitnash Residents	Independent
Seats won	3	1
Seat change	Steady	Steady
Popular vote	5,002	750
Percentage	4.3%	0.6%
- Winner of each seat at the 2011 Warwick District Council election

- Composition of the council after the election
Council control before election
Conservative
Council control after election
Conservative

Elections to Warwick District Council took place on Thursday 5 May 2011.

A total of 46 seats were up for election, all councillors from all wards. The previous elections produced a majority for the Conservative Party.

== Summary ==
=== Election result ===
Warwick District Council Election, 2011
Party	Candidates	Seats	Gains	Losses	Net gain/loss	Seats %	Votes %	Votes	+/−
Conservative	45	25	1	0	▲1	54.3%	39.5%	45,940	-1.8%
Liberal Democrats	35	9	0	0	Steady	19.6%	18.3%	21,246	-5.1%
Labour	39	8	0	1	▼1	17.4%	25.4%	29,478	+4.5%
Whitnash Residents	3	3	0	0	Steady	6.5%	4.3%	5,002	-0.8%
Green	46	0	0	0	Steady	0.0%	11.5%	13,345	+3.3%
UKIP	3	0	0	0	Steady	0.0%	0.4%	485	N/A
Independent	2	1	0	0	Steady	2.2%	0.6%	750	±0.0%

== Ward results ==
=== Bishop's Tachbrook ===
Bishop's Tachbrook Ward (1 Councillor)
Party	Candidate	Votes	%	±%
Conservative	Richard Alan Brookes	483	47.5%	−5.4%
Labour	Chris McKeown	229	22.5%	−12.0%
Independent	Malcolm Kenneth Doody	188	18.5%	N/A
Liberal Democrats	Karol Antoni Kaliczak	60	5.9%	N/A
Green	Emma Elizabeth Paveley	57	5.6%	−7.0%
Majority		254	25.0%	+6.6%
Turnout				
Conservative hold		Swing		

=== Budbrooke ===
Budbrooke Ward (2 Councillors)
Party	Candidate	Votes	%	±%
Conservative	Clare Sawdon	1,574	32.3%	−4.4%
Conservative	Alan Bertrand Rhead	1,497	30.8%	−4.3%
Labour	Emma Samantha Mort	571	11.7%	+0.8%
Labour	Steven Gordon Suckling	425	8.7%	+0.8%
Liberal Democrats	Antony Butcher	281	5.8%	N/A
Green	Harriet Worrell	218	4.5%	−5.0%
Liberal Democrats	Martin Gardner Eggleston	193	4.0%	N/A
Green	Jeremy Peter Worrell	108	2.2%	N/A
Majority		77	1.5%	−0.1%
Turnout				
Conservative hold		Swing		
Conservative hold		Swing		

=== Cubbington ===
Cubbington Ward (2 Councillors)
Party	Candidate	Votes	%	±%
Conservative	John Stanley Hammon	1,400	33.4%	−0.8%
Conservative	Norman Henry Pratt	1,355	32.3%	−0.2%
Labour	John Harrow Roberts	698	16.6%	+1.4%
Green	Gareth John Davies	513	12.2%	+2.0%
Green	Nicola Stephenson	230	5.5%	N/A
Majority		45	1.1%	+0.6%
Turnout				
Conservative hold		Swing		
Conservative hold		Swing		

=== Kenilworth Abbey ===
Kenilworth Abbey Ward (3 Councillors)
Party	Candidate	Votes	%	±%
Conservative	Michael Francis Coker	1,589	16.8%	−1.5%
Liberal Democrats	Ann Blacklock	1,495	15.9%	−0.9%
Conservative	George Reginald Illingworth	1,479	15.7%	−0.7%
Conservative	John Anthony Cooke	1,339	14.2%	−1.6%
Liberal Democrats	Kate Dickson	1,060	11.2%	−2.0%
Liberal Democrats	Pat Ryan	1,005	10.7%	−2.2%
Labour	Andrew Keith Roadnight	490	5.2%	+2.4%
Green	May Alice Fitzpatrick	476	5.0%	+1.2%
Green	Ann Laura Lewis	252	2.7%	N/A
Green	David Keith Charles Wood	244	2.6%	N/A
Majority		94	0.9%	−0.6%
Turnout				
Conservative hold		Swing		
Liberal Democrats hold		Swing		
Conservative hold		Swing		

=== Kenilworth Park Hill ===
Kenilworth Park Hill Ward (3 Councillors)
Party	Candidate	Votes	%	±%
Conservative	Dave Shilton	1,885	20.0%	−0.8%
Conservative	Felicity Gena Bunker	1,731	18.4%	−1.2%
Conservative	Andrew James Mobbs	1,673	17.7%	−1.5%
Labour	Justine Potts	724	7.7%	+4.7%
Liberal Democrats	Alison Tyler	680	7.2%	−4.8%
Liberal Democrats	Andy Tulloch	570	6.0%	−5.4%
Liberal Democrats	Susan McGowan	549	5.8%	−4.6%
Labour	Ian Henderson	547	5.8%	N/A
Green	James Harrison	497	5.3%	+1.8%
Green	Pam Lunn	333	3.5%	N/A
Green	Angela Maria Owen	243	2.6%	N/A
Majority		154	1.6%	+0.4%
Turnout				
Conservative hold		Swing		
Conservative hold		Swing		
Conservative hold		Swing		

=== Kenilworth St. John's ===
Kenilworth St. John's Ward (3 Councillors)
Party	Candidate	Votes	%	±%
Conservative	Richard Davies	1,603	18.0%	−2.2%
Conservative	John Stephen Dagg	1,478	16.6%	−3.0%
Conservative	Norman John Vincett	1,441	16.2%	−3.1%
Liberal Democrats	Gillian Anne Palmer	653	7.3%	+1.1%
Labour	Jeremy Eastaugh	634	7.1%	+1.5%
Liberal Democrats	Richard Guy Dickson	628	7.1%	+1.7%
Labour	Mary-Ann Stephenson	620	7.0%	+1.5%
Labour	Peter Joseph Shiels	598	6.7%	+1.3%
Liberal Democrats	Ian Fenwick	475	5.3%	+0.3%
Green	Pippa Austin	442	5.0%	+0.4%
Green	Rob van Schie	167	1.9%	N/A
Green	Kate Edwards-Kearney	161	1.8%	N/A
Majority		125	1.4%	+0.8
Turnout				
Conservative hold		Swing		
Conservative hold		Swing		
Conservative hold		Swing		

=== Lapworth ===
Lapworth Ward (1 Councillor)
Party	Candidate	Votes	%	±%
Conservative	Leslie Caborn	980	82.0%	−0.6%
Green	James Christopher Myles Alty	215	18.0%	+0.6%
Majority		765	64.0%	−0.6%
Turnout				
Conservative hold		Swing		

=== Leamington Brunswick ===
Leamington Brunswick Ward (3 Councillors)
Party	Candidate	Votes	%	±%
Labour	Balvinder Gill	994	15.9%	−1.3%
Labour	Jane Margaret Knight	976	15.6%	−0.4%
Labour	Alan Wilkinson	926	14.8%	−0.9%
Conservative	Bob Aujla	580	9.3%	+1.0%
Green	Ian Davison	545	8.7%	+2.4%
Green	Jonathan Chilvers	531	8.5%	+2.8%
Green	Karen Weber	491	7.9%	+3.3%
Conservative	Billy Jones	458	7.3%	−0.6%
Conservative	Ted Needham	399	6.4%	N/A
Liberal Democrats	Chris Begg	127	2.0%	−4.6%
Liberal Democrats	Paul Andrew Gilligan	120	1.9%	−4.5%
Liberal Democrats	Mohammed Ahson	101	1.6%	−3.6%
Majority		18	0.3%	−0.9%
Turnout				
Labour hold		Swing		
Labour hold		Swing		
Labour hold		Swing		

=== Leamington Clarendon ===
Leamington Clarendon Ward (2 Councillors)
Party	Candidate	Votes	%	±%
Labour	Janice Louise Dean	713	18.9%	+1.2%
Labour	Jerry Weber	661	17.5%	+2.0%
Conservative	Peter Guy Bold	581	15.4%	+1.5%
Conservative	Jonny Cope	521	13.8%	+0.9%
Liberal Democrats	Nicole Christine Alexander	486	12.9%	−2.4%
Liberal Democrats	David Peter James Robertson	372	9.9%	−5.1%
Green	Ben Phillips	217	5.8%	+0.9%
Green	Clare Louise Wandless-Phillips	150	4.0%	−0.8%
UKIP	George Lawson	68	1.8%	N/A
Majority		52	1.4%	−0.8%
Turnout				
Labour hold		Swing		
Labour hold		Swing		

=== Leamington Crown ===
Leamington Crown Ward (2 Councillors)
Party	Candidate	Votes	%	±%
Liberal Democrats	Alan Boad	855	24.9%	−7.9%
Liberal Democrats	Dave Wreford-Bush	674	19.6%	−8.7%
Labour	Paul Stephen Gillett	614	17.9%	+8.7%
Labour	Andy Marshall	581	16.9%	+8.9%
Conservative	Alison Frances Jones	318	9.3%	+0.9%
Conservative	Peter Brian Phillips	252	7.3%	−0.7%
Green	Judith Helen Barrett	94	2.7%	−0.1%
Green	George James Douglas Harwick	43	1.2%	−1.3%
Majority		181	5.3%	+0.8%
Turnout				
Liberal Democrats hold		Swing		
Liberal Democrats hold		Swing		

=== Leamington Manor ===
Leamington Manor Ward (3 Councillors)
Party	Candidate	Votes	%	±%
Liberal Democrats	Eithne Marie Goode	1,460	14.7%	−3.9%
Liberal Democrats	Roger Charles Henry Copping	1,392	14.0%	−2.9%
Liberal Democrats	Cymone Katherine De-Lara-Bond	1,267	12.8%	−3.8%
Conservative	Timothy Michael Crockford	1,129	11.4%	−0.4%
Conservative	Amanda Marjorie Stevens	1,092	11.0%	−0.5%
Conservative	Richard Tom Raven	1,080	10.9%	±0.0%
Labour	Alasdair Russell	596	6.0%	+2.8%
Labour	Peter John Putt	588	5.9%	+2.8%
Labour	Ronald Keir Stone	536	5.4%	+3.0%
Green	Felicity Rock	286	2.9%	+0.2%
Green	Chris Philpott	285	2.9%	+0.7%
Green	Les Dobner	225	2.3%	N/A
Majority		68	0.7%	−1.0%
Turnout				
Liberal Democrats hold		Swing		
Liberal Democrats hold		Swing		
Liberal Democrats hold		Swing		

=== Leamington Milverton ===
Leamington Milverton Ward (3 Councillors)
Party	Candidate	Votes	%	±%
Liberal Democrats	Bill Gifford	1.489	15.7%	−0.9%
Liberal Democrats	Sidney Ellen Tyrrell	1,167	12.3%	−2.0%
Liberal Democrats	Nicolas Pittarello	1,128	11.9%	−1.3%
Conservative	Hayley Elizabeth Lockwood Grainger	983	10.4%	−0.7%
Conservative	Caroline Evetts	954	10.1%	−0.9%
Conservative	Charlie Robbins	814	8.6%	−2.0%
Labour	Malcolm James Fraser	680	7.2%	+3.3%
Labour	Roger John Fagge	646	6.8%	+3.1%
Labour	Colin Edgar Quinny	600	6.3%	+3.1%
Green	Janet Alison Alty	455	4.8%	+0.5%
Green	Richard Brayne	295	3.1%	−1.0%
Green	Bruce Simon Knight	266	2.8%	−1.2%
Majority		322	3.4%	+1.1%
Turnout				
Liberal Democrats hold		Swing		
Liberal Democrats hold		Swing		
Liberal Democrats hold		Swing		

=== Leamington Willes ===
Leamington Willes Ward (3 Councillors)
Party	Candidate	Votes	%	±%
Labour	Richard John Edwards	1,408	17.6%	+3.5%
Labour	Barbara Mary Weed	1,329	16.6%	+3.0%
Labour	John Thomas Barrott	1,315	16.4%	+3.3%
Conservative	Kit Long	679	8.5%	−2.1%
Conservative	John Leonard Peake	654	8.2%	−2.3%
Conservative	Sarah Windrum	650	8.1%	−1.5%
Green	Ayla Nickels	424	5.3%	+1.1%
Liberal Democrats	David Kenyon Alexander	349	4.4%	−0.9%
Green	Becqke Oldham	327	4.1%	−0.1%
Green	Susan Mary Oldham	324	4.0%	±0.0%
Liberal Democrats	Sapphire Bleach	288	3.6%	−1.6%
Liberal Democrats	Heather Mary Calver	271	3.4%	−0.5%
Majority		72	1.0%	+0.5%
Turnout				
Labour hold		Swing		
Labour hold		Swing		
Labour hold		Swing		

=== Leek Wootton ===
Leek Wootton Ward (1 Councillor)
Party	Candidate	Votes	%	±%
Conservative	Susan Judith Gallagher	917	79.5%	−4.5%
Green	Janice Eleanor Austin	121	10.5%	−5.5%
Liberal Democrats	John Steven Wilson	115	10.0%	N/A
Majority		796	69.0%	+1.0%
Turnout				
Conservative hold		Swing		

=== Radford Semele ===
Radford Semele Ward (1 Councillor)
Party	Candidate	Votes	%	±%
Conservative	Michael Doody	572	55.4%	−9.4%
Labour	Kevin Walsh	223	21.6%	+7.5%
Independent	Kate Pittel	136	13.2%	N/A
Green	Dave Steele	101	9.8%	+0.8%
Majority		349	33.8%	−16.9%
Turnout				
Conservative hold		Swing		

=== Stoneleigh ===
Stoneleigh Ward (1 Councillor)
Party	Candidate	Votes	%	±%
Independent	Bertie MacKay	426	38.9%	−45.7%
Conservative	Nick Harrington	414	37.8%	N/A
Green	Tony Ross	256	23.4%	+8.0%
Majority		12	1.1%	−68.1%
Turnout				
Independent hold		Swing		

=== Warwick North ===
Warwick North Ward (3 Councillors)
Party	Candidate	Votes	%	±%
Conservative	Stephen Paul Cross	1,301	16.0%	+1.4%
Conservative	Moira-Ann Grainger	1,266	15.6%	+1.5%
Conservative	Glenn Michael Williams	1,116	13.7%	+0.1%
Labour	Maureen Anne Ethel Hooper	938	11.6%	−2.8%
Labour	Sue Griffith	933	11.5%	−2.5%
Labour	Roger William Smith	869	10.7%	−2.6%
Green	Denny Reader	451	5.6%	+1.5%
Green	John Francis Liddamore	432	5.3%	+2.0%
Green	Laura Vesty	401	4.9%	N/A
UKIP	Martin MacKenzie	231	2.8%	N/A
UKIP	Ian James Tyres	186	2.3%	N/A
Majority		35	0.4%	+0.2%
Turnout				
Conservative hold		Swing		
Conservative gain from Labour		Swing		
Conservative hold		Swing		

=== Warwick South ===
Warwick South Ward (3 Councillors)
Party	Candidate	Votes	%	±%
Conservative	Linda Bromley	1,884	17.9%	−1.1%
Conservative	Anne Monica Mellor	1,809	17.2%	−1.7%
Conservative	Gerry Guest	1,782	16.9%	−1.9%
Labour	Ian Christopher Clarke	1,047	9.9%	+3.0%
Labour	Joanne Humphreys	982	9.3%	+2.8%
Labour	Cheryl Anne Flanagan	949	9.0%	+2.6%
Green	Juliet Anne Nickels	480	4.6%	−0.2%
Liberal Democrats	Deborah Jane Pittarello	375	3.6%	−1.4%
Liberal Democrats	William Dylan Spedding	345	3.3%	−1.5%
Green	Juliet Carter	343	3.3%	−1.1%
Green	David Gareth John Cumner	301	2.9%	N/A
Liberal Democrats	Derek James Turpin	235	2.2%	−2.3%
Majority		75	0.7%	+0.6%
Turnout				
Conservative hold		Swing		
Conservative hold		Swing		
Conservative hold		Swing		

=== Warwick West ===
Warwick West Ward (3 Councillors)
Party	Candidate	Votes	%	±%
Conservative	Elizabeth Higgins	1,427	14.5%	−0.8%
Conservative	Michael John Kinson	1,415	14.3%	±0.0%
Conservative	Bob Dhillon	1,406	14.2%	+0.2%
Labour	John Holland	1,376	13.9%	+1.1%
Labour	Rebecca Elizabeth Clarke	1,300	13.2%	+0.7%
Labour	Catherine Anne Stephens	1,163	11.8%	−0.2%
Liberal Democrats	Alan Charles Beddow	399	4.0%	−0.5%
Green	Alison Jane Browne	350	3.6%	−0.8%
Liberal Democrats	Geoffrey Stewart Harris	300	3.0%	−0.5%
Liberal Democrats	Robert Hooper	282	2.9%	−0.2%
Green	Graham Browne	229	2.3%	−1.3%
Green	Suzi Caunce	222	2.2%	N/A
Majority		12	0.2%	−0.8%
Turnout				
Conservative hold		Swing		
Conservative hold		Swing		
Conservative hold		Swing		

=== Whitnash ===
Whitnash Ward (3 Councillors)
Party	Candidate	Votes	%	±%
Whitnash Residents	Bernard Kirton	1,875	23.7%	−3.5%
Whitnash Residents	Tony Heath	1,577	19.9%	−3.8%
Whitnash Residents	Judy Falp	1,550	19.6%	−3.2%
Labour	Roger Duclaud-Williams	594	7.5%	−1.0%
Labour	Michael George Wincott	529	6.7%	−0.1%
Conservative	Sandra Christine Butler	427	5.4%	N/A
Labour	Baris Yerli	406	5.1%	−1.4%
Conservative	Christine Brenda Cross	393	5.0%	N/A
Green	Jim Berreen	393	2.7%	−1.9%
Green	Sue Tucker	193	2.4%	N/A
Green	Rebecca Elizabeth Knight	158	2.0%	N/A
Majority		298	3.8%	+0.3%
Turnout				
Whitnash Residents hold		Swing		
Whitnash Residents hold		Swing		
Whitnash Residents hold		Swing		
