= HM Prison Blundeston =

Former prison near Lowestoft, England

Coordinates: 52.5101°N 1.7047°E

HMP Blundeston
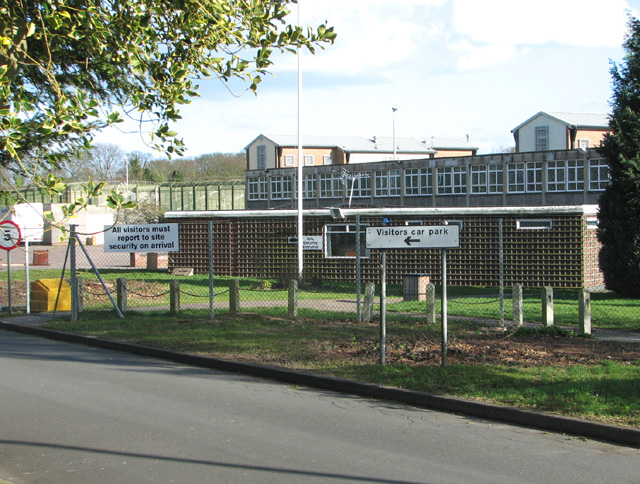
- Interactive map of HMP Blundeston
- Location: Blundeston, Suffolk
- Security class: Adult Male/Category C
- Population: 526 (August 2008)
- Opened: 1963
- Closed: 2014
- Managed by: HM Prison Services
- Governor: Mr R Stevenson (2013 - 2014)
- Website: Blundeston at justice.gov.uk

HM Prison Blundeston was a Category C men's prison, located in the Village of Blundeston in Suffolk, England. The prison was operated by Her Majesty's Prison Service, and closed in January 2014.

== History ==
Opened in 1963 with four wings (A, B, C & D wings), Blundeston Prison was expanded three times before its closure, firstly in 1975 with the addition of two multi occupancy cell wings (F & G wings), secondly in 2002 with the addition of a Democratic Therapeutic Community wing (I wing), and finally in 2008 with the construction of a 60 cell modular block for prisoners serving life sentences (J wing).

In 1996 the prison came under intense criticism after six inmates escaped whilst being transferred to other jails. The escapers had allegedly been running their own 'criminal empire' at Blundeston before their transfer. Further controversy hit the prison in 2003 when a prison officer was "sacked for making an insulting remark about...Osama bin Laden." This followed reports that inmates at Blundeston had seen their fruit quota cut after some had been accused of fermenting it to make alcohol.

Before closure, accommodation at the prison included 4 wings of single cells and 2 wings of 2 or 4-man cells. The therapeutic wing had single cell accommodation. Blundeston provided workshops, training courses, a Listener Scheme and a full-time Resettlement Officer. The visitor centre was staffed and managed by the Ormiston Children and Families Trust with facilities including a refreshments area, toilets, public pay phone and play facilities for children.

On 4 September 2013, the Ministry of Justice announced that it intended to close Blundeston Prison by March 2014. The prison formally closed in January 2014 under The Closure of Prisons Order 2014. The closure of the prison led to criticism from local politicians, including planning proposals to allow the site to be used for a large housing development. The Ministry of Justice stated that intended to sell the site for redevelopment by the end of 2014; however, the site was finally sold in January 2016 for £3 million to Badger Building. The developers are now asking for ideas for the former prison site to be submitted to them before they release planning proposals.

Demolition of the old prison started in August 2017.

== Roll of Governors ==
- Mr E Townsdrow 1963 - 1967
- Mr Winston 1968 - 1968
- Mr J Crawford 1968 - 1975
- Mr J Simmons 1975 - 1980
- Mr B Frizby 1980 - 1983
- Mr H Cropper 1983 - 1988
- Miss J Fowler 1988 - 1993
- Mr S Robinson 1993 - 2000
- Mr J Knight 2000 - 2003
- Mrs T Clarke 2003 - 2006
- Mr P Cawkwell 2006 - 2008
- Mrs S Doolan 2008 - 2011
- Mr D Bamford 2011 - 2013
- Mr R Stevenson 2013 - 2014

== Notable former inmates ==
- John Stonehouse, a former Member of Parliament who was convicted of fraud, theft, forgery, conspiracy to defraud, causing a false police investigation and wasting police time after faking his own death. Stonehouse served the last years of his sentence at Blundeston before being released in 1979.
- Richard Reid, known as the Shoe Bomber, spent time at Blundeston for a lesser charge in the 1990s
- Michael Carroll, lottery winner and self-proclaimed 'King of Chavs' spent two years at Blundeston between 2002 and 2006 for drugs offences
- Reggie Kray
- Harry Roberts
