= Elizabeth Martha Brown =

English murderess, executed by hanging in 1856

- Born: c. 1811
- Died: 9 August 1856 (aged 44 or 45); Dorchester Prison, Dorset, England, UK
- Cause of death: Hanging
- Occupation: Grocer
- Spouse(s): Bernard Bearn (1831–c. 1851); John Brown (1852–1856)
- Children: William and Thomas Bearn, died in childhood
- Parent(s): John and Martha Clark

Elizabeth Martha Brown (c. 1811 – 9 August 1856), née Clark, previously Bearn was the last woman to be publicly hanged in Dorset, England. She was executed outside Dorchester Prison after being convicted of the murder of her second husband, John Brown, on 6 July, just thirty-five days earlier. The prosecution said she had attacked him with a hatchet after he had taken a whip to her.

== Life ==
Martha Brown was born as Elizabeth Martha Clarke in 1811 in Whitehurch, Dorset. At 20, she married Bernard Bearn and had two sons Willam and Thomas who both died young and within a month of each other. Bernard Bearn died after 10 years of marriage, leaving her the sum of £50. She found work as the housekeeper to two farming brothers John and Robert Symes who held Blackmanston Farm in the Purbeck hills. Martha was housekeeper to the Symes brothers for 14 years and John Symes described her as “a most kind and inoffensive woman.”.

She met her second husband, John Brown, when they were working as servants together. The couple married at Wareham on 24 January 1852. They moved to Birdsmoor Gate, Dorset, near Beaminster. She kept a small grocer's shop. John Brown was 18 years younger than her and worked as a Carter.

== Murder of her Husband ==
John Brown arrived home at 2am on Sunday 6 July 1856. He was drunk and they quarrelled. Brown murdered her husband with a hatchet after being subjected to domestic abuse, including her husband whipping her. The solicitor Harriet Wistrich, the founder of the Centre for Women’s Justice and the co-founder of the campaigning organisation Justice for Women, has stated that she thinks Brown "snapped".

Brown maintained that her husband died because of an injury caused by his horse. Brown was arrested and tried for the murder of her husband, and was found guilty.

She wrote her confession on 8 August. In her confession she says they had a bad marriage and he would regularly beat her. She also believed he was having an affair with a neighbour.

Brown was hanged for the murder of her husband on Saturday 9 August 1856.

Among the crowd of 3,000–4,000 spectators who watched Brown's execution was the English novelist Thomas Hardy, aged 16 at the time, standing close to the gallows. He wrote seventy years later that he was ashamed to have been there. Brown was dressed in a long black silk dress. A cloth was placed over her head, but as it began to rain, her face became visible again. Hardy wrote, "I saw—they had put a cloth over the face—how, as the cloth got wet, her features came through it. That was extraordinary." "I remember what a fine figure she showed against the sky as she hung in the misty rain," he wrote elsewhere, "and how the tight black silk gown set off her shape as she wheeled half-round and back." Blake Morrison writes that the hanging of Tess in Hardy's Tess of the d'Urbervilles (1891) reflected his experience of watching Brown's death.

A local newspaper recorded that she was counselled just before her death by the Rev. D Clementson, the prison chaplain, and that she remained composed:

This morning (Saturday) a few minutes after 8 o'clock, Elizabeth Martha BROWN, convicted of the wilful murder of her husband was executed on a scaffold erected over the gateway of the new entrance leading to Dorset County Gaol from North Square. The culprit did not up to the last moment, appear to shed a tear. She on leaving her cell, shook hands with the chief warder and other officers. On her way to the scaffold her demeanour was extraordinary. The attendants on either side were entirely overcome, whilst she bore her awful position with the greatest resignation and composure. The Chaplain the Rev. D Clementson, conversed with her on spiritual subjects, and she appeared to engage in fervant [sic] devotion and prayer, with her hands clasped firmly together and upturned eyes. On arriving at the place of execution she walked with firmness up the first flight of eleven steps. On this spot the ceremony of pinioning was proceeded with. Her female attendants here left her in the care of the executioner.

== Remains ==
In 2016, it was reported that remains unearthed at the site of Dorchester prison in Dorset may belong to Brown. In 2018 it was reported that Martha may be re-buried with others in the Poundbury Cemetery, should she not be buried in the churchyard at Blackdown, where her husband's remains lie.

== Dorchester Prison mosaic ==
It was the digging of Brown's grave within the Dorchester Prison precinct that led to the discovery of a mosaic from a Roman town house. Two years later it was re-exposed during the burial of James Searle, it was then laid into the floor of the prison chapel. It was moved to Dorset Museum in 1885 and can now be viewed on the wall of the stairs leading to the library.

== In popular culture ==
A Dorset-based company, Angel Exit Theatre, produced a play called The Ballad of Martha Brown based on the life and times of Martha Brown. The play premiered at Deverills Festival in Wiltshire on 3 May 2014 and continued on a tour of the South West and South East. In September – October 2015 it again toured the UK.

In 1995, Australian band The Lucksmiths released the track "Thomas & Martha" based on Thomas Hardy's recollections of the event.

The case was re-examined in the BBC programme Murder, Mystery and My Family (series 4, episode 9).

Brown was Featured on Lucy Worsley's Lady Killers in January 2026.
