= 2007 Warwick District Council election =

2007 UK local government election

← 2003	3 May 2007	2011 →

All 46 seats to Warwick District Council 24 seats needed for a majority

	First party	Second party	Third party
Party	Conservative	Liberal Democrats	Labour
Seats won	24	9	9
Seat change	▲8	▼1	▼5
	Fourth party	Fifth party
Party	Whitnash Residents	Independent
Seats won	3	1
Seat change	Steady	▼1
- Winner of each seat at the 2007 Warwick District Council election

- Composition of the council after the election
Council control before election
No overall control
Council control after election
Conservative

The 2007 Warwick District Council election took place on 3 May 2007 to elect members of Warwick District Council in Warwickshire, England. The whole council was up for election with boundary changes since the last election in 2003. The Conservative Party gained overall control of the council from no overall control.

== Election result ==
Warwick local election result 2007
Party	Seats	Gains	Losses	Net gain/loss	Seats %	Votes %	Votes	+/−
Conservative	24			+7	52.2			
Liberal Democrats	9			0	19.6			
Labour	9			-5	19.6			
Others	4			-2	8.7			

== Ward results ==
Bishop's Tachbrook
Party	Candidate	Votes	%	±%
Conservative	Malcolm Kenneth Doody	475		
Labour	Chris McKeown	310		
Green	Nicola Stevenson	113		
Conservative gain from Labour		Swing		

Budbrooke
Party	Candidate	Votes	%	±%
Conservative	Clare Anna Insull Sawdon	1,422		
Conservative	Alan Bertrand Rhead	1,361		
Labour	Tony Griffin	423		
Green	Hannah Sassoon	368		
Labour	Ian Anthony Foulds	305		
Conservative hold		Swing		
Conservative gain from Labour		Swing		

Cubbington
Party	Candidate	Votes	%	±%
Conservative	John Stanley Hammon	1,227		
Conservative	Norman Henry Pratt	1,208		
Labour	John Harrow Roberts	573		
Green	Gareth Davies	382		
Labour	Jeremy Eastaugh	374		
Conservative hold		Swing		
Conservative hold		Swing		

Kennilworth Abbey
Party	Candidate	Votes	%	±%
Conservative	Michael Francis Coker	1,568		
Liberal Democrats	Ann Blacklock	1,444		
Conservative	George Reginald Illingworth	1,411		
Conservative	Spencer Charlton Harrison	1,352		
Liberal Democrats	Kate Dickson	1,135		
Liberal Democrats	Pat Ryan	1,107		
Green	Denny Reader	324		
Labour	Michael David Ellwood	244		
Conservative hold		Swing		
Liberal Democrats hold		Swing		
Conservative hold		Swing		

Kennilworth Park Hill
Party	Candidate	Votes	%	±%
Conservative	Dave Shilton	1,681		
Conservative	Felicity Gena Bunker	1,587		
Conservative	Andrew James Mobbs	1,548		
Liberal Democrats	Alison Rits Margaret Tyler	974		
Liberal Democrats	Doug Golby	921		
Liberal Democrats	Kevin Holt	848		
Green	Richard John Brayne	284		
Labour	Ian Henderson	243		
Conservative hold		Swing		
Conservative hold		Swing		
Conservative gain from Liberal Democrats		Swing		

Kennilworth St. John's
Party	Candidate	Votes	%	±%
Conservative	Richard Davies	1,637		
Conservative	John Hatfield	1,584		
Conservative	Norman John Vincett	1,559		
Liberal Democrats	Mary Latham Harrison	498		
Labour	Matthew John Feeley	454		
Labour	Peter Shiels	446		
Labour	Robin Rain Winn	439		
Liberal Democrats	Richard Sweeney	436		
Liberal Democrats	John Steven Wilson	401		
Green	Pippa Austin	373		
BNP	George Albert Jones	251		
Conservative hold		Swing		
Conservative hold		Swing		
Conservative hold		Swing		

Lapworth
Party	Candidate	Votes	%	±%
Conservative	Les Caborn	842		
Green	Janet Alison Alty	177		
Conservative hold		Swing		

Leamington Brunswick
Party	Candidate	Votes	%	±%
Labour	Balvinder Gill	726		
Labour	Mike Britland	674		
Labour	Jane Margaret Knight	662		
Conservative	James William Berragan	349		
Conservative	Elliot Lockwood Grainger	332		
Liberal Democrats	Godfrey Carr	276		
Liberal Democrats	Helen Cunliffe	270		
Green	Robert David King	267		
Green	Bruce Simon Knight	241		
Liberal Democrats	Bert Whitehart	221		
Green	Becqke Susan Oldham	194		
Labour hold		Swing		
Labour hold		Swing		
Labour hold		Swing		

Leamington Clarendon
Party	Candidate	Votes	%	±%
Labour	Bob Crowther	532		
Labour	Janice Louise Dean	466		
Liberal Democrats	Robert Joseph Cunliffe	460		
Liberal Democrats	Alan Charles Beddow	453		
Conservative	Michael Barker	419		
Conservative	Robin Patrick Taylor	388		
Green	James Kennedy	148		
Green	Clare Louise Wandless-Phillips	145		
Labour hold		Swing		
Labour hold		Swing		

Leamington Crown
Party	Candidate	Votes	%	±%
Liberal Democrats	Alan Boad	889		
Liberal Democrats	Cliff Harris	767		
Labour	Andy Leahy	250		
Conservative	Alistair Graham Bates	227		
Conservative	Clare Diana Hopkinson	217		
Labour	Dave Padley	217		
Green	Felicity Imogen Rock	76		
Green	John Liddamore	69		
Liberal Democrats hold		Swing		
Liberal Democrats hold		Swing		
