= Closure of Prisons Order 2014 =

United Kingdom statutory instrument

- Statutory Instrument
- Parliament of the United Kingdom
- Citation: SI 2014/3
- Introduced by: Jeremy Wright, Parliamentary Under-Secretary of State for the Ministry of Justice

Dates
- Made: 6 January 2014
- Commencement: 31 January 2014

Status: Spent

Text of the Closure of Prisons Order 2014 as in force today (including any amendments) within the United Kingdom, from legislation.gov.uk.

The Closure of Prisons Order 2014 (SI 2014/3) is a statutory instrument of the Parliament of the United Kingdom. The order closed several prisons in England.

== Background ==
In 2013 and 2014, the UK coalition government undertook a programme of policies which Justice Secretary Chris Grayling said would "modernise our prisons, bring down costs, ... [and] make sure that ... we still have access to more prison places than we inherited in 2010". This included closing a number of prisons in what Channel 4 called "the biggest prison closure programme in decades", as well as building a new 'super-prison'. Proposals to close small prisons in favour of new super-prisons were compared to the Brown government's planned Titan prisons.

In January 2013, Grayling announced plans to close seven prisons: HM Prison Bullwood Hall in Essex, HM Prison Camp Hill on the Isle of Wight, HM Prison Canterbury in Kent, HM Prison Gloucester in Gloucestershire, HM Prison Kingston in Portsmouth, HM Prison Shepton Mallet in Somerset, and HM Prison Shrewsbury in Shropshire. At the time, BBC News reported that a further five prisons would be closed by January 2014.

In September 2013, Grayling announced that Blundeston, Dorchester, Northallerton and Reading prisons would close and that HM Prison The Verne would be closed and converted into an immigration detention centre.

== Provisions ==
The provisions of the order include:

- Closing HM Prison Blundeston in Suffolk, HM Prison Dorchester in Dorset, HM Prison and Young Offender Institution Northallerton in North Yorkshire, HM Prison and Young Offender Institution Reading in Berkshire and HM Prison The Verne in Dorset.
  - Special reasons were given for the closure of HM Prison Reading and HM Prison Northallerton as is required when the only prison in a county is closed under the Prison Act 1952. Both prisons were deemed too small and limited in their infrastructure to keep open and that their closing would not have an adverse effect on the operation of the prison system in their respective counties.

== Responses ==
The chair of the Prison Officers Association, Peter McParlin, said that the prison closures were "cuts-driven" and would result in prison officers working in "overcrowded and violent" institutions.

Peter Aldous, the MP for Waveney, opposed the closure of HM Prison Blundeston and called on the Ministry of Justice to publish the report on which the decision was based. Labour politician Bob Blizzard called the closure of Blundeston a "panic measure" to help the government's economic plans and criticised the fact that the prison had been newly refurbished.

Plans to close HM Prison Dorchester were opposed by Richard Drax who said that the savings the government was hoping to make were "a false economy" due to Dorset probation officers having to go to Exeter to meet with prisoners.

== Aftermath ==
The prison sites were mostly sold by the Ministry of Justice. Northallerton was taken over by Hambleton District Council and redeveloped, Dorchester and Blundeston were sold to housing developers in 2014 and 2016 respectively, and Reading was sold to an educational charity in 2024. The Verne prison was re-opened in July 2018 as a prison for sex offenders.
