= John Patrick Hannan =

Irish prison fugitive (born 1933)

- Born: 1933
- Disappeared: 22 December 1955 (aged 21–22); HM Prison The Verne
- Status: Missing for 70 years, 2 months and 24 days
- Known for: Successfully escaping HM Prison The Verne
- Height: 5 ft 7 in (170 cm)
- Criminal charges: Vehicle theft and assaulting two police officers
- Criminal penalty: 21 months imprisonment
- Criminal status: Escaped

John Patrick Hannan (born 1933) is an Irish prison fugitive who holds the record for the longest escape from custody, having escaped HM Prison The Verne, Isle of Portland, Dorset in December 1955, aged 22 years.

== Prior to the escape ==
In November 1955 at the Old Bailey, Hannan was sentenced to 21 months imprisonment for stealing a car and assaulting two police officers. He was imprisoned at HM Prison The Verne on the Isle of Portland, Dorset.

== Escaping HM Prison The Verne ==
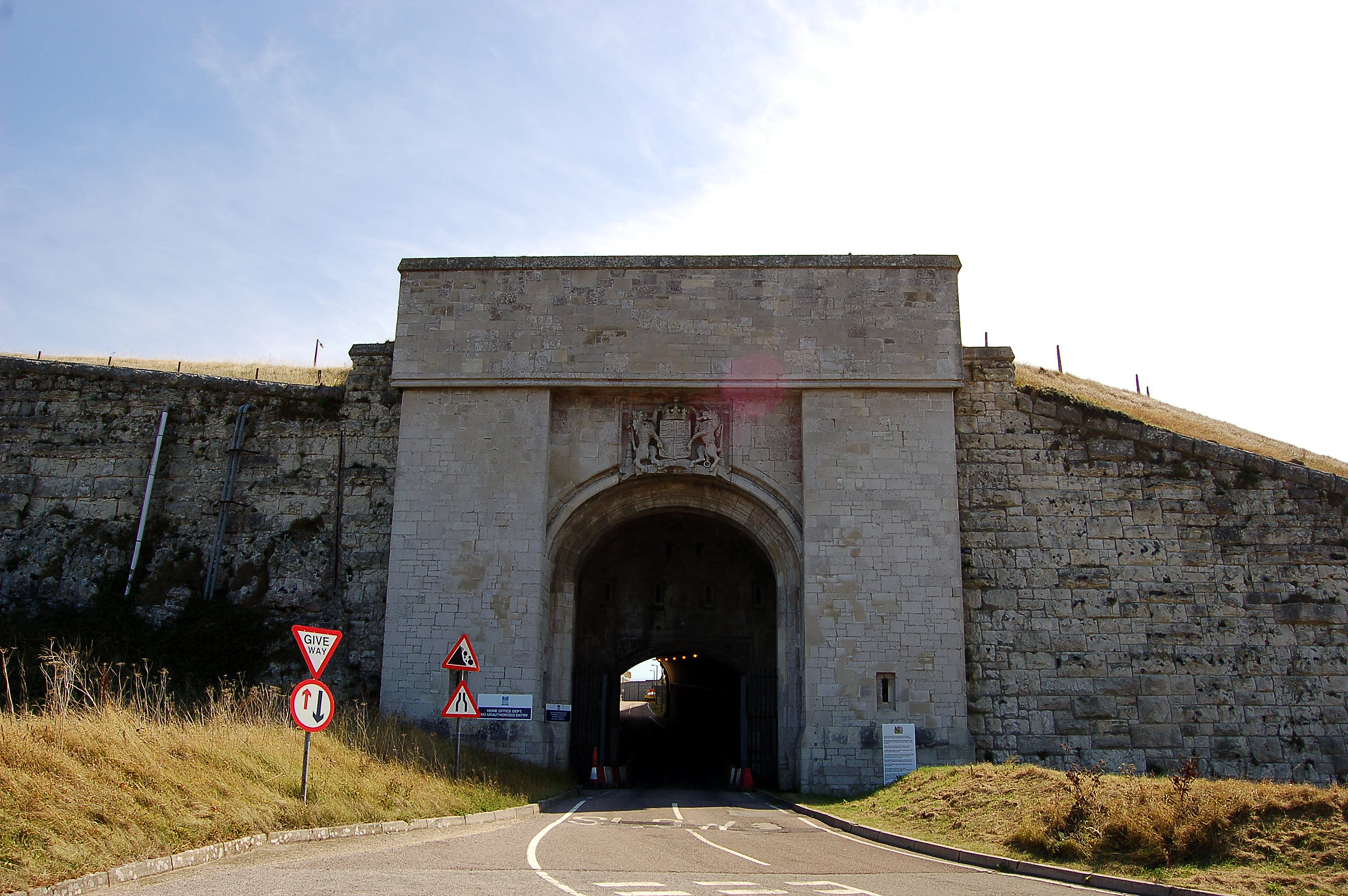
Entrance to the prison

On 22 December 1955, Hannan, with fellow inmate Gwynant Thomas, escaped the prison. Hannan had been there just 30 days. Hannan and Thomas used a knotted bedsheet to climb over the wall (according to a later interview with a future governor, the wall was "probably" lower than it is today). The pair followed a railway line connecting the isle with the mainland; a tracker dog lost a scent near Portland naval base.

After escaping, the pair, who were wearing grey prison overalls, burgled a nearby petrol station and stole overcoats, beer, and cigarettes before leaving the isle. The toilet window was later found open by a mechanic. The pair were spotted by a lorry driver, which led to Thomas' arrest at Kingston Russell, near Dorchester. He had been on the run for 16 hours.

Dorset Police (then Dorset Constabulary), attempted to locate Hannan by using roadblocks and tracking dogs, but were unsuccessful.

== Post-escape ==
Police believe that Hannan fled to his native Ireland. Assuming he is still alive, Hannan has been on the run for seventy years.

In 1998, Dorset Police appealed directly to Hannan to give himself up, writing in a service newsletter: "If you read this, Mr. Hannan, please write in, we'd love to hear from you." Whilst Dorset Police reported that they had stopped actively searching for Hannan in 1998, they stated that "considerable interest" would be taken to any information about Hannan's whereabouts.

In 2001, having never been registered as dead (using his correct details), Hannan became de facto world's longest prison fugitive, overtaking the title of American double killer Leonard Fristoe's record of 45 years and 11 months as a fugitive. Fristoe was imprisoned for double murder in 1920 of a police Constable and a deputy Sheriff in Nevada, United States. Having escaped from Nevada State Prison in 1923, Fristoe lived for nearly 46 years under the alias of Claude R. Willis, before being turned in by his own son in California in 1969, after an argument. After serving several years in prison he died of natural causes. Despite holding the record, Hannan will not be added to the Guinness Book of Records unless he is caught or gives himself up.

If Hannan was caught, he could face being charged with the common-law offence of escaping from lawful custody, facing a potential additional sentence and completion of his original 21-month sentence. The Home Secretary would be able to decide whether he should be pardoned.

== See also ==
- Prison escape
- List of fugitives from justice who disappeared
- List of prison escapes
