= HM Prison Reading =

Former British prison

HMP Reading
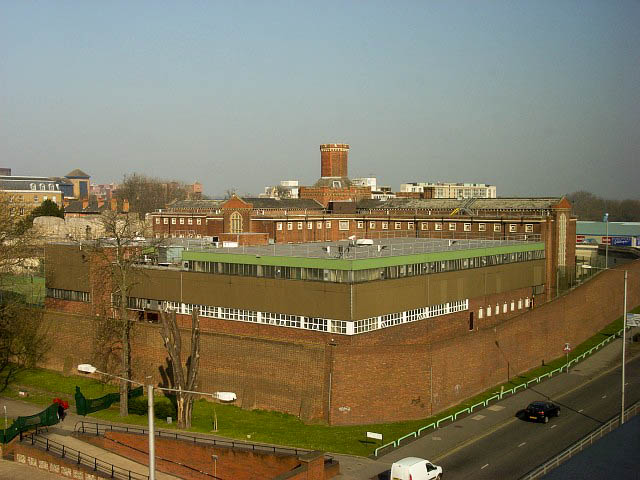
- The prison in 2007
- Interactive map of HMP Reading
- Location: Reading, Berkshire; 51°27′23″N 00°57′50″W
- Security class: Young offenders Institution
- Opened: 1844
- Closed: 2014
- Managed by: HM Prison Services
- Website: Reading at justice.gov.uk

HM Prison Reading, popularly known as Reading Gaol, is a former prison located in Reading, Berkshire, England. The prison was operated by Her Majesty's Prison Service (now His Majesty's Prison Service) until its closure at the start of 2014. It is a Grade II listed building and sits on the site of Reading Abbey.

== History ==
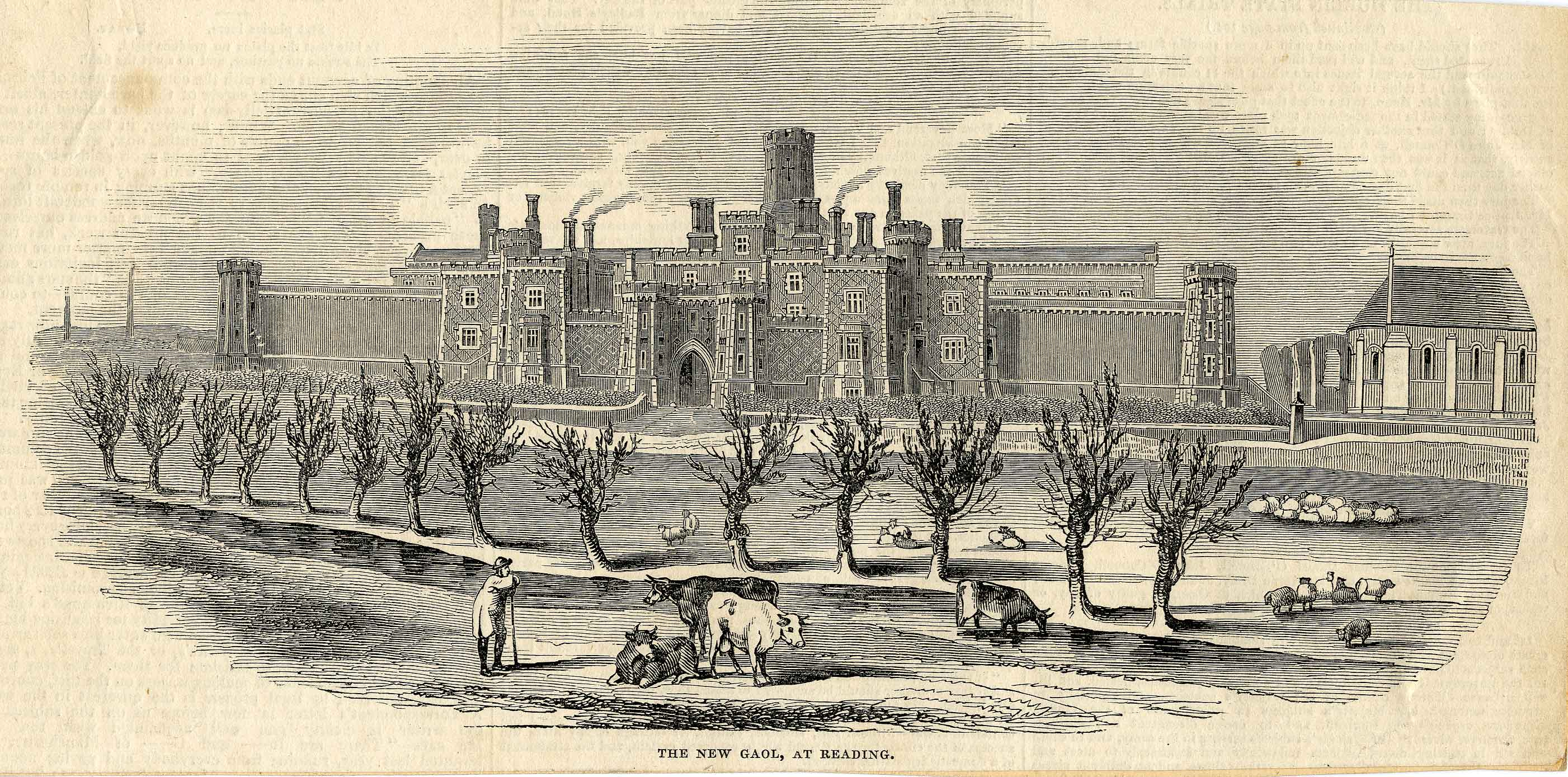
Reading Gaol in 1844

HM Prison Reading was built in 1844 as the Berkshire County Gaol in the heart of Reading on the site of the former county prison, alongside the ruins of Reading Abbey and beside the River Kennet.

Designed by George Gilbert Scott and William Boynthon Moffatt, it was based on London's New Model Prison at Pentonville with a cruciform shape, and is a good example of early Victorian prison architecture. The Pentonville Prison design of 1842 was based on the design of Eastern State Penitentiary of 1829 in Philadelphia, Pennsylvania.

It was designed to carry out what was the very latest penal technique of the time, known as the separate system. As a county gaol, its forecourt served as the site for public executions, the first one in 1845 before a crowd of 10,000; after 1868 executions took place inside, the last one in 1913.

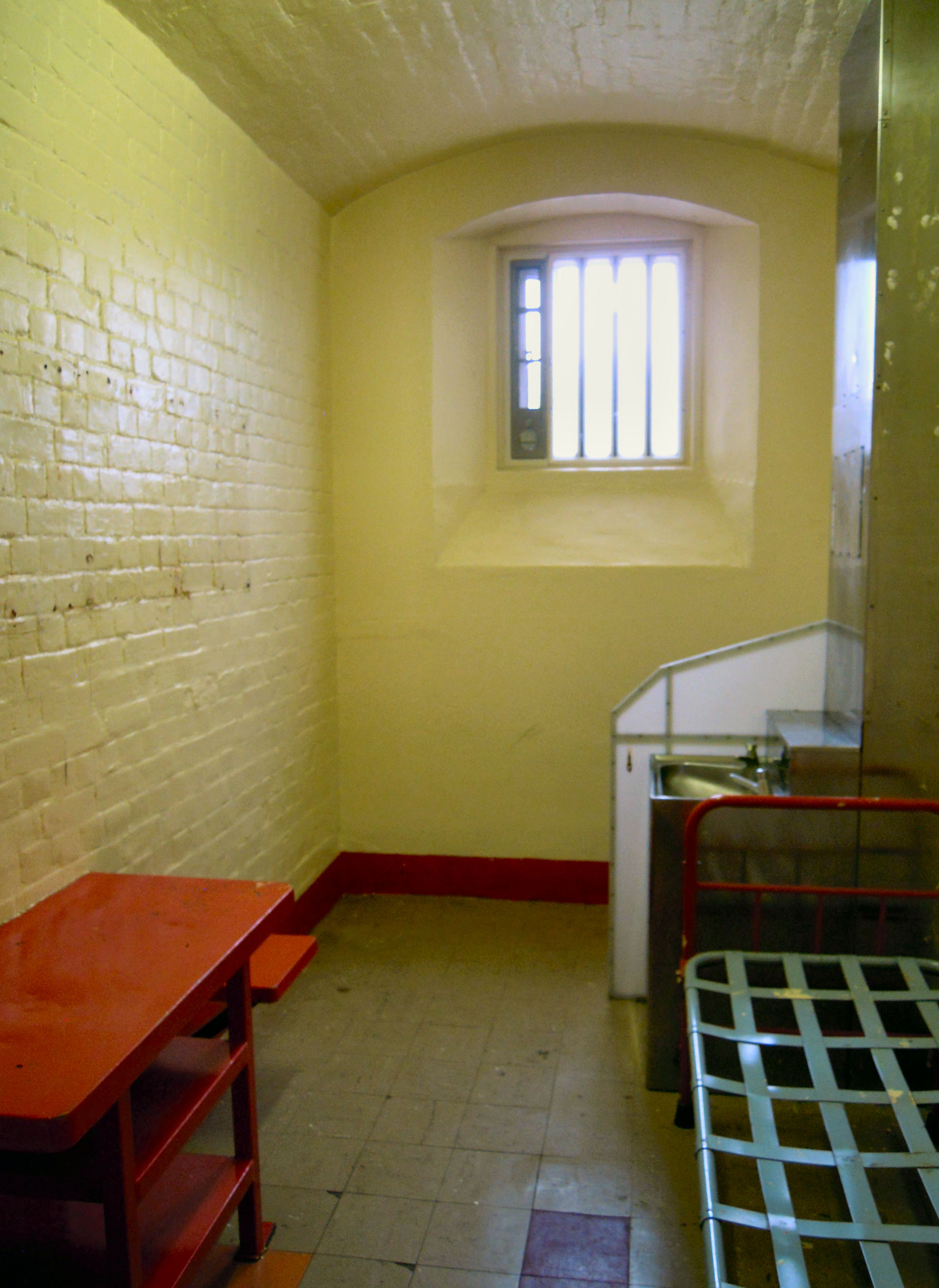
Cell occupied by Oscar Wilde, as seen during Reading's 2016 Year of Culture

It was used to hold Irish prisoners involved in the 1916 Easter Rising, for internment in both World Wars, as a borstal and for a variety of other purposes. Most of those interned during the First World War were of German origin but there were also Latin Americans, Belgians, and Hungarians. In 1969 the wing where the Irish had been held was demolished.

In 1973 Reading was re-designated as a local prison, and around that time its old castle wall was removed. The building was designated as Grade II listed in 1978. In 1992 it became a Remand Centre and Young Offenders Institution, holding prisoners between the ages of 18 and 21 years.

Accommodation at the prison consisted of a mixture of single and double occupancy cells, on three wings. There was also a residential unit (Kennet wing) of single occupancy cells for low-security 'open' prisoners. There were two education departments at the prison, one run by the Prison service and one by Milton Keynes College. The remand centre library was run by Reading Borough Libraries.

The historic records of the prison are housed at the Berkshire Record Office and are the subject of a project focused on the history of ‘ordinary’ men in Berkshire charged with indecent assault/gross indecency between 1861-1967, the Broken Futures project, funded by the National Lottery Heritage Fund and managed and delivered by Support U, the LGBT+ support and wellbeing charity in the Thames Valley.

== Closure ==
Graffiti by Banksy painted overnight 28 February/1 March 2021.

On 4 September 2013, it was announced that HM Prison Reading would close by the end of that year, and the prison formally closed in January 2014 under The Closure of Prisons Order 2014.

There have been calls for the prison building to be preserved as an arts and cultural hub, and Reading Borough Council have confirmed that they would like to retain the complex. In June 2014 it was proposed that the site could be converted into a theatre venue. However, in November 2015 it was announced by Chancellor George Osborne and Justice Secretary Michael Gove that the site was to be sold to housing developers.

In May 2016, it was announced that the former prison would be made available as an arts venue for the Reading 2016 Year of Culture programme. An exhibition curated by Artangel attracted tens of thousands of visitors.

There have been concerted efforts by campaigners wanting a permanent arts and cultural hub at the gaol. These include a petition started by local MP Matt Rodda and the "Reading Gaol Hug" in which about 1000 people surrounded the gaol linking hands. However in October 2019 the Ministry of Justice announced that the site was to be sold. A "March to the Gaol" scheduled for March 2021 had to be cancelled at the last moment due to the Coronavirus Pandemic.

Reading Borough Council put forward a bid to turn the gaol into an arts and cultural hub. Artisan Real Estate was the successful bidder but in November 2020 it was announced that the sale had fallen through.

Reading Borough Council were then given a period of exclusivity to prepare a new bid for the gaol by mid March 2021

On the night of 28 February 2021, graffiti artist Banksy painted a mural on the wall of the prison depicting a prisoner escaping on a rope made of bedsheets tied to a typewriter, speculated to be a reference to Wilde's imprisonment. Banksy uploaded a video of the creation titled "Create Escape" on 5 March, mixed over a narration by Bob Ross. Damian Jones of NME noted the possible link to the ongoing campaign to save the gaol building as an arts hub, and local MP Matt Rodda also expressed the hope that the artwork would become a part of this.

In May 2021, it was announced that Reading Borough Council's bid for the gaol had been turned down by the Ministry of Justice because the offer of £2.6 million was too low.

In January 2024, the property was sold for £7 million to the non-profit Ziran Education Foundation, run by the Chinese-born businessman Channing Bi.

Between Janurary 2024 and October 2025 reading prison was broken into by urban explorers, management for the prison owner appointed Thermotec Security Services Ltd to be principle contractor for the site on 26th October 2025 and since then they now manage the full security of the site, maintain the grounds and they also look after the Banksy mural on the prison wall with dog handlers responding to anyone who attempts to get to close to the mural behind the security fence. Break-ins have been down by 10% compared to 70% before the site had security. Six dog handlers patrol the site and dogs run lose inside the grounds. New CCTV has been installed inside and outside the prison and is viewed remotely by the security company, site owner and management, Thames valley police have arrested urban explorers for attacking security staff and throwing items at dog handler security vehicles while trying to gain access to the disused prison.

== Notable former inmates ==
- Oscar Wilde – author of poem The Ballad of Reading Gaol, based on memory of an execution that took place here while he was serving a sentence for homosexual offences (1895–1897)
- Charles Thomas Wooldridge – murderer, whose execution inspired Wilde's poem (1896)
- Amelia Dyer – serial killer of children (1896)
- Arthur Griffith - Irish republican politician detained after the Easter Rising (1916)
- Stacy Keach – actor, served six months after being arrested for cocaine smuggling (1984)
- Anthony Joshua - Drug Offences

== Bibliography ==
- Peter Southerton: Reading Gaol by Reading Town (Berkshire Books, Gloucs., 1993).
- Anthony Stokes: Pit of Shame, The Real Ballad of Reading Gaol (Waterside Press, 2007).
