= Social Impact Contractor =

Company providing UK community benefits

A Social Impact Contractor is a corporate body which holds a contract with a public body to provide goods or services with defined outcomes intended to achieve a community or environmental benefit.

In the United Kingdom, tax relief is available for accredited Social Impact Contractors as a result of provisions announced in the Treasury's Autumn Statement in December 2013 and implemented in the Finance Act 2014. Accreditation is managed by the Cabinet Office, who require an annual report to be submitted by each Social Impact Contractor. Tax relief is given at 30% of the shares.

As at 22 July 2015, there were two Social Impact Contractors accredited by the Cabinet Office: Aspire Gloucestershire Ltd. and Ambition East Midlands Ltd.

The government has stated that it will be monitoring the uptake of the reliefs (measured in terms of investor and investee numbers, amounts of investment and the distribution of levels of investment, and to evaluating the impact of the scheme on social enterprises' performance and the associated social benefit.

Charities' views on the tax relief have been mixed, with criticisms that the scheme is difficult to use, too small-scale or an opportunity for tax avoiders.
