= 2015 Warwick District Council election =

2015 UK local government election

← 2011	7 May 2015	2019 →

All 46 seats to Warwick District Council 24 seats needed for a majority

	First party	Second party	Third party
Party	Conservative	Labour	Whitnash Residents
Seats won	31	9	3
Seat change	▲6	▲1	Steady
Popular vote	32,645	17,114	2,789
Percentage	43.3%	22.7%	3.7%
	Fourth party	Fifth party
Party	Liberal Democrats	Green
Seats won	2	1
Seat change	▼7	▲1
Popular vote	9,876	10,102
Percentage	13.1%	13.4%
Swing		▲0.2%
- Winner of each seat at the 2015 Warwick District Council election

- Composition of the council after the election
Council control before election
Conservative
Council control after election
Conservative

Elections to Warwick District Council took place on Thursday 7 May 2015, with votes counted and declared on Saturday 9 May 2015.

A total of 46 seats were up for election, all councillors from all wards. The previous elections produced a majority for the Conservative Party. The boundaries of many of the wards across the District were changed from the previous election.

== Boundary review ==
The 2015 election came after a boundary review. In 2011, the Local Government Boundary Commission for England (LGBCE) decided to review Warwick District Council, since 30% of the wards had over 10% more voters than average. According to the council, the review would "decide how many councillors [are] right for Warwick district" and a working party of one councillor from each political group would be set up to oversee the review process; the review was expected to cost the council £34,700. The council sought to keep a similar number of councillors in order to manage councillor workload. It was reported that consideration would be given to single-councillor wards, as well as to Warwick Gates and Chase Meadow becoming their own wards.

The LGBCE announced its draft plans for consultation in 2012. The plans included keeping the number of councillors at 46, having mostly two-councillor wards, and significantly redrawing ward boundaries. Comments on the proposed wards mainly focused on the areas of Bishop's Tatchbrook, Heathcote, Whitnash, and Myton. The final recommendations were released by the LGBCE in March 2013. They were enacted by the Warwick (Electoral Changes) Order 2014, a statutory instrument which was made on 8 January 2014, and came into effect at the 2015 election.

== Summary ==
=== Election result ===
Warwick District Council Election, 2015
Party	Candidates	Seats	Gains	Losses	Net gain/loss	Seats %	Votes %	Votes	+/−
Conservative	45	31	8	2	▲6	67.4	43.3	32,645	+2.5
Labour	40	9	3	2	▲1	19.6	22.7	17,114	-2.4
Whitnash Residents	3	3	0	0	0	6.52	3.7	2,789	-0.5
Liberal Democrats	25	2	0	7	▼7	4.35	13.1	9,876	-4.7
Green	46	1	1	0	▲1	2.17	13.4	10,102	+2.2
UKIP	7	0	0	0	0	0.0	2.3	1,734	+1.9
Independent	4	0	0	1	▼1	0.0	1.4	1,055	+0.8

== Ward results ==
=== Abbey Ward ===
Abbey Ward (3 Councillors)
Party	Candidate	Votes	%	±%
Conservative	Michael Francis Coker	1,851	15.1	−1.7
Conservative	George Reginald Illingworth	1,803	14.7	−1.0
Conservative	Rowena Hill	1,693	13.8	−0.4
Liberal Democrats	Kate Dickson	1,360	11.1	−4.8
Liberal Democrats	Andy Tulloch	1,060	8.6	−2.6
Liberal Democrats	Alison Rita Margaret Tyler	977	8.0	−2.7
Labour	Josh Payne	943	7.7	+2.5
Green	John Alfred Dearing	668	5.4	+0.4
Green	Janice Eleanor Austin	665	5.4	+2.7
UKIP	Susan Mabel Katherine Eva Chambers	614	5.0	N/A
Green	Ayla Claire Nickels	488	4.0	+1.6
TUSC	Non Frenguelli	156	1.3	N/A
Majority		333	7.2	+6.3
Turnout		12,278	72.7	
Registered electors		6,331		
Conservative hold				
Conservative hold				
Conservative gain from Liberal Democrats				

=== Arden Ward ===
Arden Ward (2 Councillors)
Party	Candidate	Votes	%	±%
Conservative	Sue Gallagher	2,777	46.0%	−33.5%
Conservative	Peter Whiting	2,261	37.5%	−44.5%
Green	Julia Sokota	503	8.3%	−2.2%
Green	Avnash Jhita	503	8.1%	−9.9%
Majority		1,758	29.1%	−37.4%
Turnout		6,032	78.0%	
Conservative hold				
Conservative hold				

=== Aylesford ===
Aylesford Ward (2 Councillors)
Party	Candidate	Votes	%	±%
Conservative	Noel Stephen Butler	1,746	29.3%	+15.0%
Conservative	Martyn Geoffrey Ashford	1,506	25.3%	+11.1%
Labour	Roger William Smith	914	15.4%	+1.5%
Labour	Raj Randev	870	14.6%	+1.4%
Green	James Christopher Myles Alty	341	5.7%	+2.1%
Liberal Democrats	Deborah Jane Pittarello	300	5.0%	+1.0%
Green	Thomas Merlin Ingall	277	4.6%	+2.3%
Majority		592	17.6%	+17.4%
Turnout		5,954	69.1%	
Conservative hold				
Conservative hold				

=== Bishop's Tachbrook ===
Bishop's Tachbrook Ward (1 Councillor)
Party	Candidate	Votes	%	±%
Conservative	Andrew John William Day	846	53.1%	+5.6%
Labour	Jane Naylor	364	22.8%	+0.3%
Independent	Lyn Rees Day-Jones	296	18.6%	N/A
Green	Bruce Simon Knight	87	5.5%	−0.1%
Majority		482	30.0%	+5.0%
Turnout		1593	76.2%	
Conservative hold				

=== Brunswick ===
Brunswick Ward (2 Councillors)
Party	Candidate	Votes	%	±%
Green	Ian William Davison	1,264	22.3%	+13.6%
Labour	Kristie Naimo	1,181	20.8%	+5.2%
Green	Jonathan Chilvers	1,146	20.2%	+11.7%
Labour	Alan Wilkinson	854	15.0%	+0.2%
Conservative	Charles Barclay	524	9.2%	+1.9%
Conservative	Will Jackson	521	9.2%	+2.8%
Liberal Democrats	Moh Ahson	189	3.3%	+1.7%
Majority		35	0.6%	+0.3%
Turnout				
Green gain from Labour				
Labour hold				

=== Budbrooke ===
Budbrooke Ward (2 Councillors)
Party	Candidate	Votes	%	±%
Conservative	Alan Bertrand Rhead	2,332	34.0%	+1.7%
Conservative	Peter Phillips	2,057	30.0%	−0.8%
Labour	Emma Samantha Mort	802	11.7%	+0.0%
UKIP	Scott Wilson	569	8.3%	N/A
Labour	Christopher Glyn Wrench	492	7.2%	−1.5%
Green	Nicholas James Standish Brierley	311	4.5%	+0.0%
Green	Bernie McCullagh	305	4.4%	+2.2%
Majority		1,255	32.1%	+30.6%
Turnout		6,868	80.2%	
Conservative hold				
Conservative hold				

=== Clarendon ===
Clarendon Ward (2 Councillors)
Party	Candidate	Votes	%	±%
Conservative	Caroline Evetts	1,029	18.5%	+3.1%
Labour	Jane Margaret Knight	937	16.8%	−2.1%
Conservative	Alexander Shaw	835	15.0%	+1.2%
Labour	Jerry Weber	722	13.0%	−4.5%
Liberal Democrats	Nick Pittarello	713	12.8%	−0.1%
Liberal Democrats	David Peter James Robertson	500	9.0%	−0.9%
Green	Tony Ross	471	8.5%	+2.7%
Green	Rob van Schie	360	6.5%	+2.5%
Majority		102	1.8%	+0.4%
Turnout		5,567	65.3%	
Conservative gain from Labour				
Labour hold				

=== Crown ===
Crown Ward (2 Councillors)
Party	Candidate	Votes	%	±%
Liberal Democrats	Alan Boad	1,074	18.7%	−6.2%
Labour	Stef Parkins	935	16.3%	−1.6%
Labour	John Howell	905	15.8%	−1.1%
Liberal Democrats	Nick Solman	781	13.6%	−6.3%
Conservative	Georgina Stockley	608	10.6%	+1.3%
Conservative	Andrew Ian Phillips	590	10.3%	+3.0%
UKIP	Sam Turner	379	6.6%	N/A
Green	Juliet Carter	236	4.1%	+1.4%
Green	Angela Owen	235	4.1%	+2.9%
Majority		30	0.5%	−4.8%
Turnout		5,743	63.9%	
Liberal Democrats hold				
Labour gain from Liberal Democrats				

=== Emscote ===
Emscote Ward (2 Councillors)
Party	Candidate	Votes	%	±%
Conservative	Richard Edgington	1,386	26.7%	+13.0%
Labour	Jackie D'Arcy	1,009	19.4%	+8.7%
Labour	Raj Kang	805	15.5%	+4.8%
UKIP	Martin Mackenzie	606	11.7%	9.4%
Green	David Cumner	523	10.1%	+5.2%
Liberal Democrats	Geoffrey Stewart Harris	513	9.9%	N/A
Green	Matt Swift	351	6.8%	1.9%
Majority		204	3.9%	+2.5%
Turnout		5,193	68.0%	
Conservative hold				
Labour hold				

=== Leam ===
Leam Ward (2 Councillors)
Party	Candidate	Votes	%	±%
Labour	Colin Quinney	1,050	20.8%	+3.2%
Labour	Barbara Weed	1,049	20.8%	+4.2%
Conservative	Jackie David	842	16.6%	+8.1%
Conservative	Jack McCann	776	15.4%	+7.2%
Green	Ayla Nickels	697	13.8%	+8.5%
Green	Azzees Dee Minott	642	12.7%	+8.6%
Majority		207	4.1%	+3.1%
Turnout		5,056	67.3%	
Labour hold				
Labour hold				

=== Manor ===
Manor Ward (2 Councillors)
Party	Candidate	Votes	%	±%
Conservative	Amanda Marjorie Stevens	1,542	21.9%	+10.9%
Conservative	Gordon Harry Cain	1,339	19.0%	+7.6%
Liberal Democrats	Cymone Katherine De-Lara Bond	1,190	16.9%	+2.2%
Liberal Democrats	Heather Mary Calver	984	14.0%	0.0%
Labour	Sue Eades	780	11.1%	+5.1%
Labour	Ron Stone	572	8.1%	+2.2%
Green	Christopher John Philpott	324	4.6%	+1.5%
Green	Felicity Rock	303	4.3%	+1.4%
Majority		149	2.1%	+1.4%
Turnout		7,034	75.4%	
Conservative gain from Liberal Democrats				
Conservative gain from Liberal Democrats				

=== Milverton ===
Milverton Ward (2 Councillors)
Party	Candidate	Votes	%	±%
Liberal Democrats	Bill Gifford	1,523	23.4%	+7.7%
Conservative	Hayley Grainger	1,141	17.6%	+7.2%
Liberal Democrats	David George Wigman	1,015	15.6%	+3.3%
Conservative	John Stanley Hammon	827	12.7%	+2.6%
Labour	Helen McCabe	717	11.0%	+3.8%
Labour	Catherine Anne Stephens	620	9.5%	+2.7%
Green	Martin Atkin	432	6.6%	+1.8%
Green	Caz Ingall	227	3.5%	+0.4%
Majority		126	1.9%	−1.5%
Turnout		6,502	75.1%	
Liberal Democrats hold				
Conservative gain from Liberal Democrats				

=== Myton & Heathcote ===
Myton & Heathcote Ward (2 Councillors)
Party	Candidate	Votes	%	±%
Conservative	Neale Murphy	1,286	25.9%	+8.0%
Conservative	Raj Mann	1,252	25.2%	+8.0%
Independent	Anne Monica Mellor	440	8.9%	N/A
Liberal Democrats	Kelvin Howard Lambert	431	8.7%	+5.1%
Green	Juliet Anne Nickels	427	8.6%	+4.0%
Green	Richard John Brayne	383	7.7%	+4.4%
UKIP	Tim Griffiths	374	7.5%	N/A
Independent	Linda Bromley	370	7.5%	N/A
Majority		812	16.4%	+15.7%
Turnout		4,963	75.6%	
Conservative hold				
Conservative hold				

=== Newbold ===
Newbold Ward (2 Councillors)
Party	Candidate	Votes	%	±%
Conservative	Andrew Thompson	1,197	19.5%	+8.6%
Conservative	Daniel John Howe	1,160	18.9%	+10.3%
Labour	Janice Louise Dean	860	14.0%	+7.7%
Labour	Pip Burley	846	13.8%	+8.4%
Liberal Democrats	Carolyn Patricia Gifford	661	10.8%	−2.8%
Liberal Democrats	Simon Wheeler	623	10.2%	−1.7%
Green	Judith Helen Barrett	397	6.5%	+3.7%
Green	Clare Louise Phillips	394	6.4%	+4.1%
Majority		300	4.9%	+2.3%
Turnout		6,138	72.1%	
Conservative gain from Liberal Democrats				
Conservative gain from Liberal Democrats				

=== Park Hill ===
Park Hill Ward (3 Councillors)
Party	Candidate	Votes	%	±%
Conservative	Dave Shilton	2,643	19.6%	−0.4%
Conservative	Felicity Bunker	2,520	18.7%	+0.3%
Conservative	Andrew Mobbs	2,436	18.1%	+0.4%
Labour	Jeremy Eastaugh	964	7.2%	−0.5%
Labour	Caryll Green	756	5.6%	−0.2%
Labour	Elizabeth Ann Saxon	717	5.3%	N/A
Liberal Democrats	Lynn Annette Pollard	668	5.0%	−2.2%
Liberal Democrats	Andy Brierley	659	4.9%	−1.1%
Green	James Nicholas Harrison	591	4.4%	−0.9%
Liberal Democrats	Ian Malcolm Fenwick	574	4.3%	−1.5%
Green	Pam Lunn	519	3.8%	+0.3%
Green	George Martin	439	3.3%	+0.7%
Majority		1,472	10.9%	+9.3%
Turnout		13,486	74.2%	
Conservative hold				
Conservative hold				
Conservative hold				

=== Radford Semele ===
Radford Semele Ward (1 Councillor)
Party	Candidate	Votes	%	±%
Conservative	Michael Doody	1,019	63.0%	+7.6%
Labour	Kevin Walsh	378	21.6%	+1.8%
Green	Rebecca Elizabeth Knight	220	9.8%	+3.8%
Majority		641	39.6%	+5.8%
Turnout		1,617	75.2%	
Conservative hold				

=== Saltisford ===
Saltisford Ward (2 Councillors)
Party	Candidate	Votes	%	±%
Conservative	Terry John Morris	1,582	24.9%	+8.0%
Labour	John-Paul Bromley	1,214	19.1%	+7.3%
Conservative	Bala Jaspal	1,070	16.9%	+2.4%
Labour	John Paul Sullivan	1,034	16.3%	+7.3%
Liberal Democrats	Anthony Butcher	575	9.1%	+6.2%
Green	Alison Jane Browne	502	7.9%	+5.7%
Green	James Barrett	369	5.8%	+2.9%
Majority		144	2.3%	
Turnout		6,346	67.4%	
Conservative hold				
Labour gain from Conservative				

=== St. John's Ward ===
St. John's Ward (3 Councillors)
Party	Candidate	Votes	%	±%
Conservative	Richard Davies	2,488	18.1%	+0.1%
Conservative	Pat Cain	2,463	17.9%	+1.3%
Conservative	John Cooke	2,453	17.8%	+1.6%
Liberal Democrats	Richard Guy Dickson	1,132	8.2%	+0.9%
Liberal Democrats	Gill Palmer	974	7.1%	0.0%
Labour	Richard Thomas Grimes	792	5.8%	−1.3%
Labour	Nick Hoten	698	5.1%	−1.9%
Labour	Peter Joseph Shiels	673	4.9%	−1.8%
Green	Pippa Austin	632	4.6%	−0.4%
Liberal Democrats	John Steven Wilson	632	4.6%	−0.7%
Green	James Connor Ablett	512	3.7%	+1.8%
Green	Andrew John Patrick	309	2.2%	+0.4
Majority		1,321	9.6%	+8.2
Turnout		13,758	72.7%	
Conservative hold				
Conservative hold				
Conservative hold				

=== Stoneleigh & Cubbington ===
Stoneleigh & Cubbington Ward (2 Councillors)
Party	Candidate	Votes	%	±%
Conservative	Nick Harrington	1,390	26.3%	−7.1%
Conservative	Pam Redford	1,177	22.3%	−10.0%
Independent	David Alan Ellwood	1,039	19.6%	N/A
Labour	John Harrow Roberts	614	11.6%	−5.0%
Green	Gareth John Davies	468	8.8%	−3.4%
Labour	Fiona Margaret Walsh	376	7.1%	N/A
Green	Colin Maddison Hughes	224	4.2%	−1.3%
Majority		138	2.6%	+1.5%
Turnout		5,288	75.0%	
Conservative hold				
Conservative hold				

=== Sydenham ===
Sydenham Ward (2 Councillors)
Party	Candidate	Votes	%	±%
Labour	John Thomas Barrott	1,262	25.1%	+8.7%
Labour	Balvinder Gill	1,249	24.8%	+8.9%
Conservative	Elliott James Mason	828	16.5%	+8.4%
Conservative	Rachel Willis	786	15.6%	+6.3%
Green	Derrick Garth Knight	492	9.8%	+1.9%
Green	Peggy Wiseman	412	8.2%	+4.2%
Majority		421	8.4%	
Turnout		5,029	58.9%	
Labour hold				
Labour hold				

=== Whitnash ===
Whitnash Ward (3 Councillors)
Party	Candidate	Votes	%	±%
Whitnash Residents	Judith Ann Falp	1,941	15.2%	−8.5%
Whitnash Residents	Tony Heath	1,851	14.6%	−5.3%
Whitnash Residents	Robert Leslie Margrave	1,646	12.9%	−6.7%
Labour	William David Clemmey	1,374	10.8%	+3.3%
Conservative	Christine Brenda Cross	1,078	8.5%	+3.1%
Labour	Sarah Campbell	1,036	8.1%	+1.4%
Conservative	Thomas Raynor	988	7.8%	+2.8%
Labour	Tim Naylor	954	7.5%	+2.4%
Conservative	David Wyatt	886	7.0%	N/A
Green	Eloise Rhianon Chilvers	375	3.0%	+0.3%
Green	Sue Tucker	363	2.8%	+0.4%
Green	Stan Shire	232	1.8%	−0.2%
Majority		272	2.1%	−1.7%
Turnout		12,724	68.5%	
Whitnash Residents hold				
Whitnash Residents hold				
Whitnash Residents hold				

=== Woodloes ===
Woodloes Ward (2 Councillors)
Party	Candidate	Votes	%	±%
Conservative	Stephen Cross	1,400	26.3%	+9.7%
Conservative	Moira-Ann Grainger	1,206	22.6%	+7.0%
Labour	Daniel Browne	766	14.4%	+2.8%
Labour	Alec Roberts	602	11.3%	−0.2%
UKIP	Jayne Macbrayne	474	8.9%	+6.1%
UKIP	Alastair Macbrayne	327	6.1%	N/A
Liberal Democrats	Alan Charles Beddow	261	4.9%	N/A
Green	Graham Paul Meredith Browne	173	3.2%	−2.4%
Green	Andy Stevenson	121	2.3%	−3.0%
Majority		440	8.3%	+7.9%
Turnout		5,330	69.2%	
Conservative hold				
Conservative hold				
