= HM Prison Dorchester =

Former prison in Dorset, England

Coordinates: 50.7169°N 2.4374°W

HMP Dorchester
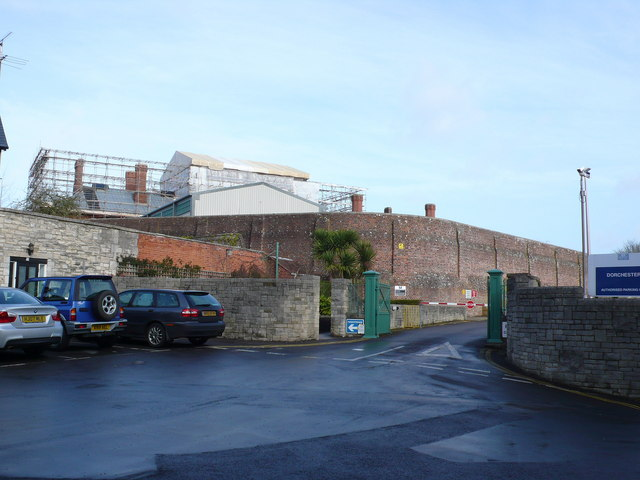
- Main gates of Dorchester Prison
- Interactive map of HMP Dorchester
- Location: Dorchester, Dorset
- Security class: Adult Male/Local
- Population: 252 (August 2008)
- Opened: 1800s
- Closed: 2014
- Managed by: HM Prison Services
- Governor: Steve Hodson
- Website: Dorchester at justice.gov.uk

HM Prison Dorchester was a local men's prison, located in Dorchester in Dorset, England. The prison was operated by His Majesty's Prison Service, and closed in January 2014.

== History ==
Erected during the 19th century, the prison buildings are a typical Victorian design.

The prison was built on the site of a Roman town house, the remains of which included a mosaic which is now in Dorset Museum.

In 2006, it was revealed that 25% of random drug tests on inmates had proven positive. Though cannabis was the most commonly detected drug, a number of inmates had tested positive for opiates such as heroin.

In 2007 the Prison Reform Trust said that prison staff were "battling against overwhelming odds in old and overcrowded premises", after an inspection report from Her Majesty's Chief Inspector of Prisons said there were too many inmates there, and too little investment in prison buildings and facilities. The report also criticised the lack of work opportunities for inmates. Conditions improved to an extent, and the prison was awarded ‘Most Improved Prison for 2008'.

Before closure, Dorchester Prison held adult males and young adult males from Dorchester, Poole and Bournemouth Crown Courts, as well as Magistrates' courts in Dorset and some in Somerset. The prison population was made up of roughly half convicted prisoners, and half remanded inmates. Dorchester Prison's education department offered courses such as Catering and industrial cleaning. The physical education department also offered recognised qualifications for some heath and training programmes, as well as recreational activities. Other facilities for inmates at the prison included a library and chaplaincy support.

On 4 September 2013, the Ministry of Justice announced that it intended to close Dorchester Prison, and the prison was formally closed in January 2014 under The Closure of Prisons Order 2014.

The site of the prison was put up for sale by the Ministry of Justice, and in August 2014 Dorchester Town Council and the Dorchester Civic Society published a blueprint that is aimed at guiding the redevelopment of the prison site into a residential led mixed-use development. On 24 December 2014 it was announced that Dorchester Prison along with Gloucester Prison, Kingston Prison and Shepton Mallet Prison had been sold to City and Country. A community consultation was held on the redevelopment of the site, and in September 2015 it was revealed that City and Country had refined their plans which included retaining the main Victorian buildings of the site for conversion into apartments. In December 2015 City and Country submitted a planning application to West Dorset District Council to redevelop the prison site into 190 homes. The plans also include redeveloping the gatehouse into a museum.

In March 2016 it was announced that human remains buried in the prison grounds were to be exhumed before any redevelopment took place. The project included archaeologists who studied the diet, health and lifestyle of those buried, as well as help with identification.

== In popular culture ==
Filming for the MCU film Spider-Man: Brand New Day took place in November 2025. The former prison doubled as HMP Leicester in BBC drama The Gold, and appears in Luther: The Fallen Sun.

== See also ==
- Elizabeth Martha Brown
