= Warwick District Council elections =

Warwick District Council elections are held every four years. Warwick District Council is the local authority for the non-metropolitan district of Warwick in Warwickshire, England. Since the last boundary changes in 2019, 44 councillors have been elected from 17 wards.

== Council elections ==
Year	Conservative	Labour	Liberal Democrats (Note: Includes totals for the predecessors of the Liberal Democrats, the Liberal Party and SDP (both of which participated in the Alliance).)	Reform	Green	Independents & Others (Note: Includes Residents Associations)	Council control after election
Local government reorganisation; council established
1973	26	25	7	–	–	0	No overall control
1976	41	14	3	–	–	0	Conservative
1979	40	13	4	–	–	1	Conservative
1983 (Note: New wards boundaries)	31	7	4	–	–	3	Conservative
1987	29	7	6	–	0	3	Conservative
1991	24	10	8	–	0	3	Conservative
1995 (Note: District boundary changes took place but the number of seats remained the same)	13	17	11	–	0	4	No overall control
1999	10	16	13	–	0	6	No overall control
2003 (Note: New ward boundaries)	16	10	14	–	0	6	No overall control
2007 (Note: New ward boundaries)	24	9	9	–	0	4	Conservative
2011	25	8	9	–	0	3	Conservative
2015 (Note: New ward boundaries)	31	9	2	–	1	3	Conservative
2019 (Note: New ward boundaries)	19	5	9	–	8	3	No overall control
2023	6	11	10	0	14	3	No overall control

== Results maps ==
2003 results map

2007 results map

2011 results map

2015 results map

2019 results map

2023 results map

== By-election results ==
=== 1995–1999 ===
Warwick North By-Election 1 May 1997
Party	Candidate	Votes	%	±%
Labour		2,401	49.1	−9.4
Conservative		1,820	37.2	+13.7
Liberal Democrats		666	13.6	+1.8
Majority		581	11.9	
Turnout		4,887		
Labour hold		Swing		

Budbrooke By-Election 17 July 1997
Party	Candidate	Votes	%	±%
Conservative		560	59.4	+7.6
Labour		224	23.8	−24.4
Liberal Democrats		159	16.9	+16.9
Majority		336	35.6	
Turnout		943	42.0	
Conservative hold		Swing		

=== 1999–2003 ===
Warwick North By-Election 7 June 2001
Party	Candidate	Votes	%	±%
Labour	Misan McFarland	2,236	52.4	−3.7
Conservative		1,320	30.9	+4.7
Liberal Democrats		545	12.8	+1.8
Green		167	3.9	−2.8
Majority		916	21.5	
Turnout		4,268		
Labour hold		Swing		

Warwick West By-Election 7 June 2001
Party	Candidate	Votes	%	±%
Labour		1,837	48.7	+0.5
Conservative		1,336	35.4	+7.9
Liberal Democrats		430	11.4	−1.2
Green		167	4.4	−7.2
Majority		441	13.3	
Turnout		3,770		
Labour hold		Swing		

Whitnash By-Election 7 June 2001
Party	Candidate	Votes	%	±%
Labour		1,440	38.2	+11.4
Residents		1,194	31.6	−25.1
Conservative		761	20.2	+9.5
Liberal Democrats		255	6.8	+6.8
Green		123	3.3	−2.5
Majority		246	6.6	
Turnout		3,773		
Labour gain from Independent		Swing		

St. John's By-Election 15 November 2001
Party	Candidate	Votes	%	±%
Conservative		983	56.2	+2.0
Labour		516	29.5	+5.1
Liberal Democrats		249	14.2	−2.0
Majority		467	26.7	
Turnout		1,748	24.0	
Conservative hold		Swing		

=== 2003–2007 ===
Warwick South By-Election 4 November 2004
Party	Candidate	Votes	%	±%
Conservative	Anne Mellor	1,059	56.4	+27.4
Liberal Democrats	David Manuel	426	22.7	+9.2
Labour	John Barrott	300	16.0	+1.7
Green	Juliet Nickels	94	5.0	−4.9
Majority		633	33.7	
Turnout		1,879	25.0	
Conservative hold		Swing		

Kenilworth St John's By-Election 2 March 2006
Party	Candidate	Votes	%	±%
Conservative	Norman Vincett	890	48.8	+6.9
Liberal Democrats	Shirley Shilton	674	37.0	+19.1
Labour	Jeremy Eastaugh	206	11.3	−6.8
Independent	Brian Hadland	52	2.9	−10.2
Majority		216	11.8	
Turnout		1,822	31.3	
Conservative hold		Swing		

=== 2007–2011 ===
Leamington Brunswick By-Election 4 June 2009
Party	Candidate	Votes	%	±%
Labour	Alan Wilkinson	605	35.8	−9.1
Conservative	Didar Kundi	428	25.3	+3.8
Liberal Democrats	Charlotte Farrington	216	12.8	−4.3
Green	Rebecca Knight	209	12.4	−4.1
BNP	Martin Smallwood	136	8.0	+8.0
Whitnash Residents	Clive Taylor	96	5.7	+5.7
Majority		177	10.5	
Turnout		1,690	29.0	
Labour hold		Swing		

Warwick South By-Election 22 July 2010
Party	Candidate	Votes	%	±%
Conservative	Linda Bromley	1,107	54.0	+0.2
Labour	Chris McKeown	648	31.6	+13.3
Liberal Democrats	Chris Spedding	294	14.3	+0.2
Majority		459	22.4	
Turnout		2,049		
Conservative hold		Swing		

=== 2015–2019 ===
Myton and Heathcote By-Election 1 December 2016
Party	Candidate	Votes	%	±%
Conservative	Mary Noone	488	53.6	+2.5
Liberal Democrats	Nick Solman	228	25.0	+16.3
Labour	Ben Wesson	194	21.3	+21.3
Majority		260	28.6	+12.2
Turnout		910	22.3	−53.3
Conservative hold		Swing		

Stoneleigh and Cubbington By-Election 5 October 2017
Party	Candidate	Votes	%	±%
Conservative	Trevor Wright	502	52.6	+13.0
Labour	Josh Payne	311	32.6	+15.1
Liberal Democrats	Richard Dickson	113	11.8	+11.8
Green	Chris Philpott	29	3.0	−10.3
Majority		191	20.0	
Turnout		955		
Conservative hold		Swing		

=== 2019–2023 ===
Leamington Lillington By-Election 29 October 2019
Party	Candidate	Votes	%	±%
Liberal Democrats	Daniel Russell	1,296	55.3	+7.1
Conservative	Hayley Key	664	28.3	+11.1
Labour	Luc Lowndes	384	16.4	−5.5
Majority		632	27.0	
Turnout		2,344		
Liberal Democrats hold		Swing		

Warwick Myton and Heathcote By-Election 12 December 2019
Party	Candidate	Votes	%	±%
Conservative	Jacqui Grey	1,710	39.3	+4.2
Labour	Curtis Oliver-Smith	1,079	24.8	+1.0
Green	Paul Atkins	812	18.7	−1.1
Liberal Democrats	Hugh Foden	644	14.8	−6.4
Independent	Bob Dhillon	103	2.4	+2.4
Majority		631	14.5	
Turnout		4,348		
Conservative hold		Swing		

Leamington Clarendon By-Election 6 May 2021
Party	Candidate	Votes	%	±%
Labour	Colin Quinney	1,370	42.5	+8.0
Conservative	Frances Lasok	761	23.6	+6.0
Liberal Democrats	Hugh Foden	539	16.7	−12.8
Green	Ignaty Dyakov-Richmond	431	13.4	+1.2
Independent	Hafeez Ahmed	103	3.2	+3.2
SDP	Josh Payne	16	0.5	+0.5
Majority		609	18.9	
Turnout		3,220		
Labour hold		Swing		

Whitnash By-Election 2 December 2021
Party	Candidate	Votes	%	±%
Whitnash Residents	Adrian Barton	835	55.2	+5.7
Labour	Lucy Phillips	431	28.5	+6.5
Conservative	John Kane	127	8.4	+1.8
Green	Sarah Richards	88	5.8	−4.7
Liberal Democrats	Trevor Barr	32	2.1	−2.9
Majority		404	26.7	
Turnout		1,513		
Whitnash Residents hold		Swing		

Leamington Clarendon By-Election 16 June 2022
Party	Candidate	Votes	%	±%
Labour	Christopher King	1,064	49.0	+14.5
Liberal Democrats	Justine Ragany	612	28.2	−1.3
Conservative	Frances Lasok	365	16.8	−0.8
Green	Ignaty Dyakov-Richmond	105	4.8	−7.4
UKIP	Gerald Smith	24	1.1	−5.2
Majority		452	20.8	
Turnout		2,170		
Labour hold		Swing		

=== 2023–2027 ===
Warwick All Saints and Woodloes By-Election 18 January 2024
Party	Candidate	Votes	%	±%
Labour	Claire Wightman	961	52.5	
Conservative	Jody Tracey	687	37.5	
Liberal Democrats	Laurence Byrne	183	10.0	
Majority		274	15.0	
Turnout		1,831		
Labour hold		Swing		

Leamington Clarendon By-Election 2 May 2024
Party	Candidate	Votes	%	±%
Labour	Helen Adkins	1,267	51.7	
Conservative	Moira-Ann Grainger	407	16.6	
Liberal Democrats	John Kelly	365	14.9	
Green	Amanda Dyakov-Richmond	362	14.8	
UKIP	Gerald Smith	50	2.0	
Majority		860	35.1	
Turnout		2,451		
Labour hold		Swing		

Warwick All Saints and Woodloes By-Election 13 February 2025
Party	Candidate	Votes	%	±%
Green	Sam Jones	719	34.9	
Reform	Nigel Clarke	450	21.8	
Labour	Cora-Laine Moynihan	399	19.4	
Conservative	Jody Tracey	383	18.6	
Liberal Democrats	Laurence Byrne	110	5.3	
Majority		269	13.1	
Turnout		2,061		
Green gain from Labour		Swing		

Kenilworth Park Hill By-Election 18 September 2025
Party	Candidate	Votes	%	±%
Green	Alison Firth	1,007	40.3	
Conservative	Malcolm Graham	588	23.6	
Reform	Timothy Wade	447	18.1	
Liberal Democrats	John Dubber	344	13.9	
Labour	Nicola Jones	81	3.3	
Majority		419	16.7	
Turnout		2,469	31.5	
Green hold		Swing		

Leamington Clarendon By-Election 18 September 2025
Party	Candidate	Votes	%	±%
Labour	Chris Knight	574	30.3	
Liberal Democrats	Raina Deo	561	29.6	
Reform	Nigel Clarke	309	16.3	
Green	Abi Underwood	240	12.7	
Conservative	Dominic Smith	140	7.4	
Independent	Megan Clarke	72	3.8	
Majority		13	0.7	
Turnout		1,896	25.2	
Labour hold		Swing		
