= 1983 Warwick District Council election =

1983 UK local government election

The 1983 Warwick District Council election was held on Thursday 5 May 1983 to elect all 45 members of Warwick District Council to a four-year term, the same day as other local elections in the United Kingdom. The election was held under new boundaries following changes which decreased the number of councillors from 58 to 45. It was preceded by the 1979 election and followed by the 1987 election. The Conservative Party held control of the council. Turnout across the council was 52.0%.

== Results summary ==
1983 Warwick District Council election
Party	Seats	Net gain/loss	Seats %	Votes %	Votes	+/−
Conservative	31		68.9			
Labour	7		15.6			
Alliance	4		8.9			
Ratepayers	3		6.7			
Independent	0		0.0			

== Ward results ==
=== Bishop's Tachbrook ===
Bishop's Tachbrook (1 seat)
Party	Candidate	Votes	%
Conservative	Cecil Wilkins (Note: Cecil Wilkins was elected in 1979 as the candidate for the Conservative Party in the Barford, Norton Lindsey, Sherbourne and Wasperton ward.)	Unopposed	
Registered electors		2,552	
Conservative win (new seat)			

=== Budbrooke ===
Budbrooke (1 seat)
Party	Candidate	Votes	%
Conservative	Alan Skinner	570	60.5
Alliance	John Haselgrove	230	24.4
Labour	David Griffin	142	15.1
Majority		340	36.1
Total valid votes		942	99.3
Rejected ballots		7	0.7
Turnout		949	50.5
Registered electors		1,880	
Conservative win (new seat)			

=== Cubbington ===
Cubbington (2 seats)
Party	Candidate	Votes	%
Conservative	Clifford Cleaver (Note: Clifford Cleaver was elected in 1979 as a candidate for the Conservative Party in the former Cubbington ward.)	1,285	54.7
Conservative	John Hammon (Note: John Hammon was elected in 1979 as the candidate for the Conservative Party in the Blackdown, Eathorpe, Hunningham, Offchurch, Old Milverton, Wappenbury and Weston-Under-Wetherley ward.)	1,119	47.6
Alliance	David Saul	745	31.7
Alliance	Carol O'Donnell	662	28.2
Labour	David French	269	11.5
Labour	William Evans	262	11.2
Total valid votes		2,349	99.9
Rejected ballots		3	0.1
Turnout		2,352	53.9
Registered electors		4,360	
Conservative win (new seat)			
Conservative win (new seat)			

=== Keniworth Abbey ===
Kenilworth Abbey (3 seats)
Party	Candidate	Votes	%
Conservative	Kenneth Rawnsley (Note: Kenneth Rawnsley was elected in 1979 as a candidate for the Conservative Party in the Kenilworth Castle ward.)	1,934	50.0
Conservative	Michael Coker (Note: Michael Coker was elected in 1979 as a candidate for the Conservative Party in the Kenilworth Castle ward.)	1,823	47.1
Conservative	John Cooke	1,787	46.2
Alliance	Jack Bastock (Note: Jack Bastock was elected in 1979 as a candidate for the Liberal Party in the Kenilworth Abbey and Borrowell ward.)	1,766	45.6
Alliance	Leslie Windybank	1,577	40.7
Alliance	Haydn Thomas (Note: Haydn Thomas was elected in 1979 as a candidate for the Liberal Party in the Kenilworth Abbey and Borrowell ward.)	1,557	40.2
Labour	Melanie Lomas	313	8.1
Labour	Geoffrey Cleave	300	7.8
Labour	Teresa Blackwell	294	7.6
Total valid votes		3,870	99.2
Rejected ballots		33	0.8
Turnout		3,903	62.6
Registered electors		6,236	
Conservative win (new seat)			
Conservative win (new seat)			
Conservative win (new seat)			

=== Kenilworth Park Hill ===
Kenilworth Park Hill (2 seats)
Party	Candidate	Votes	%
Conservative	Spencer Harrison (Note: Spencer Harrison was elected in 1979 as a candidate for the Conservative Party in the former Kenilworth Park Hill ward.)	911	46.4
Alliance	Robert Butler (Note: Robert Butler was elected in 1979 as a candidate for the Liberal Party in the former Kenilworth Park Hill ward.)	898	45.7
Conservative	Thomas Dalton	896	45.6
Alliance	Paul Weatherall	840	42.8
Labour	John Airey	182	9.3
Labour	Christopher Payne	166	8.5
Total valid votes		1,963	99.7
Rejected ballots		5	0.3
Turnout		1,968	61.6
Registered electors		3,195	
Conservative win (new seat)			
Alliance win (new seat)			

=== Kenilworth St. John's ===
Kenilworth St. John's (3 seats)
Party	Candidate	Votes	%
Conservative	Robert Wooller	2,029	58.8
Conservative	John Wilson (Note: John Wilson was elected in 1979 as a candidate for the Conservative Party in the Kenilworth Windy Arbour ward.)	2,009	58.2
Conservative	James Whitby (Note: James Whitby was elected in 1979 as a candidate for the Conservative Party in the Kenilworth Windy Arbour ward.)	1,933	56.0
Alliance	William Wozencroft (Note: William Wozencroft was elected in 1979 as a candidate for the Labour Party in the former Kenilworth St. John's ward.)	1,170	33.9
Alliance	John Whitehouse	830	24.1
Alliance	Mary Harrison	733	21.2
Labour	Brenda Payne	651	18.9
Labour	Mark Juby	564	16.3
Total valid votes		3,451	99.5
Rejected ballots		19	0.5
Turnout		3,470	57.4
Registered electors		6,049	
Conservative win (new seat)			
Conservative win (new seat)			
Conservative win (new seat)			

=== Lapworth ===
Lapworth (1 seat)
Party	Candidate	Votes	%
Conservative	John Walker (Note: John Walker was elected in 1979 as the candidate for the Conservative Party in the Beausale, Guy's Cliffe, Haseley, Hatton, Honiley and Leek Wootton ward.)	Unopposed	
Registered electors		2,377	
Conservative win (new seat)			

=== Leamington Brunswick ===
Leamington Brunswick (3 seats)
Party	Candidate	Votes	%
Labour	Roger Grenville	1,973	64.8
Labour	Ian Frost	1,917	62.9
Labour	Estelle Morris (Note: Estelle Morris was elected in 1979 as a candidate for the Labour Party in the Leamington Kingsway ward.)	1,846	60.6
Conservative	Peter Jennings	592	19.4
Conservative	Anthony Fitzpatrick	575	18.9
Conservative	Clive Lee	549	18.0
Alliance	Anne Walker	266	8.7
Alliance	David Alexander	264	8.7
Alliance	Peter Wales	249	8.2
Total valid votes		3,047	99.7
Rejected ballots		10	0.3
Turnout		3,057	45.2
Registered electors		6,761	
Labour win (new seat)			
Labour win (new seat)			
Labour win (new seat)			

=== Leamington Clarendon ===
Leamington Clarendon (3 seats)
Party	Candidate	Votes	%
Conservative	Robert Coombes (Note: Robert Coombes was elected in 1979 as a candidate for the Conservative Party in the Leamington Campion ward.)	1,104	49.4
Conservative	David Leigh-Hunt	1,002	44.8
Conservative	Sydney Ward	1,002	44.8
Labour	Anthony Fry	662	29.6
Labour	Josephine Miles	644	28.8
Labour	Susan Atkinson	637	28.5
Alliance	Shelia Grainger	425	19.0
Alliance	Kenneth Chisholm	389	17.4
Alliance	Daphne Hinton	370	16.5
Total valid votes		2,236	99.8
Rejected ballots		5	0.2
Turnout		2,241	46.3
Registered electors		4,842	
Conservative win (new seat)			
Conservative win (new seat)			
Conservative win (new seat)			

=== Leamington Crown ===
Leamington Crown (3 seats)
Party	Candidate	Votes	%
Conservative	Roy Charles (Note: Roy Charles was elected in 1979 as a candidate for the Conservative Party in the former Leamington Willes ward.)	780	35.8
Conservative	Patricia Robinson	763	35.0
Conservative	Michael Kemp	740	34.0
Labour	William Drury	696	32.0
Labour	Paul Hamilton	678	31.1
Labour	Julia Weare (Note: Julia Weare was elected in 1979 as a candidate for the Labour Party in the former Leamington Crown ward.)	671	30.8
Alliance	Virginia Breakwell	636	29.2
Alliance	Robert Lindley	607	27.9
Alliance	Alan Boad	582	26.7
Total valid votes		2,177	99.9
Rejected ballots		2	0.1
Turnout		2,179	45.4
Registered electors		4,798	
Conservative win (new seat)			
Conservative win (new seat)			
Conservative win (new seat)			

=== Leamington Manor ===
Leamington Manor (3 seats)
Party	Candidate	Votes	%
Conservative	Stanley Birch (Note: Stanley Birch was elected in 1979 as a candidate for the Conservative Party in the former Leamington Manor ward.)	1,722	55.3
Conservative	Peter Barton (Note: Peter Barton was elected in 1979 as a candidate for the Conservative Party in the former Leamington Manor ward.)	1,693	54.4
Conservative	John Higgins (Note: John Higgins was elected in 1979 as a candidate for the Conservative Party in the Leamington Beverley ward.)	1,587	51.0
Alliance	Margaret Begg	1,080	34.7
Alliance	Roger Copping	1,042	33.5
Alliance	Clifford Harris	963	30.9
Labour	Reginald Long	285	9.2
Labour	David Deaton	268	8.6
Labour	Helen Vitali	250	8.0
Total valid votes		3,113	99.8
Rejected ballots		5	0.2
Turnout		3,118	53.3
Registered electors		5,855	
Conservative win (new seat)			
Conservative win (new seat)			
Conservative win (new seat)			

=== Leamington Milverton ===
Leamington Milverton (3 seats)
Party	Candidate	Votes	%
Alliance	Valerie Davis	1,442	45.0
Alliance	Philip Emm	1,362	42.5
Alliance	Charles Bevan	1,353	42.2
Conservative	Margaret Bull (Note: Margaret Bull was elected in 1979 as a candidate for the Conservative Party in the Leamington Albany ward.)	1,248	38.9
Conservative	Christopher Clark (Note: Christopher Clark was elected in 1979 as a candidate for the Conservative Party in the Leamington Albany ward.)	1,195	37.3
Conservative	George Cox (Note: George Cox was elected in 1979 as a candidate for the Conservative Party in the Leamington Albany ward.)	1,164	36.3
Labour	Susan Byrd	519	16.2
Labour	Deborah Moore	481	15.0
Labour	Cynthia Beckett	453	14.1
Total valid votes		3,208	99.8
Rejected ballots		5	0.2
Turnout		3,213	56.5
Registered electors		5,690	
Alliance win (new seat)			
Alliance win (new seat)			
Alliance win (new seat)			

=== Leamington Willes ===
Leamington Willes (3 seats)
Party	Candidate	Votes	%
Conservative	Balraj Dhesi	1,130	40.9
Labour	Peter Byrd	1,075	38.9
Labour	Richard Chessum	1,018	36.9
Conservative	Edward Doyle (Note: Edward Doyle was elected in 1979 as a candidate for the Conservative Party in the former Leamington Willes ward.)	974	35.3
Labour	John Haw	948	34.3
Conservative	Brian Docker	917	33.2
Alliance	Rachel Chesterfield	360	13.0
Alliance	Anthony Bainbridge	284	10.3
Alliance	Andrew Wiggin	282	10.2
Total valid votes		2,762	99.7
Rejected ballots		9	0.3
Turnout		2,771	52.3
Registered electors		5,296	
Conservative win (new seat)			
Labour win (new seat)			
Labour win (new seat)			

=== Leek Wootton ===
Leek Wootton (1 seat)
Party	Candidate	Votes	%
Conservative	Josephine Compton	Unopposed	
Registered electors		2,191	
Conservative win (new seat)			

=== Radford Semele ===
Radford Semele (1 seat)
Party	Candidate	Votes	%
Conservative	Charles Lane	518	50.4
Alliance	Carole Burke	208	20.2
Independent	Michael Doody	186	18.1
Labour	Patricia Bacon	116	11.3
Majority		310	30.2
Total valid votes		1,028	98.7
Rejected ballots		14	1.3
Turnout		1,042	54.5
Registered electors		1,912	
Conservative win (new seat)			

=== Stoneleigh ===
Stoneleigh (1 seat)
Party	Candidate	Votes	%
Conservative	Peter Simpson (Note: Peter Simpson was elected in 1979 as the candidate for the Conservative Party in the Ashow, Baginton, Bubbenhall and Stoneleigh ward.)	578	57.6
Alliance	Vera Royston	426	42.4
Majority		152	15.1
Total valid votes		1,004	97.3
Rejected ballots		28	2.7
Turnout		1,032	42.7
Registered electors		2,416	
Conservative win (new seat)			

=== Warwick North ===
Warwick North (3 seats)
Party	Candidate	Votes	%
Conservative	Alfred Boxley	1,453	45.0
Conservative	John Morley (Note: John Morley was elected in 1979 as a candidate for the Conservative Party in the Warwick Central ward.)	1,414	43.8
Conservative	Alfred Hunt	1,373	42.5
Alliance	Paul Rich	867	26.9
Alliance	Barbara Keeley	866	26.8
Labour	Sylvia Budge	863	26.7
Labour	David Nash	852	26.4
Labour	Humphrey Griffiths (Note: Humphrey Griffiths was elected in 1979 as a candidate for the Labour Party in the Leamington Crown ward.)	836	25.9
Alliance	Robert Behrens	808	25.0
Total valid votes		3,228	99.3
Rejected ballots		24	0.7
Turnout		3,252	48.0
Registered electors		6,782	
Conservative win (new seat)			
Conservative win (new seat)			
Conservative win (new seat)			

=== Warwick South ===
Warwick South (2 seats)
Party	Candidate	Votes	%
Conservative	Gerald Guest (Note: Gerald Guest was elected in 1979 as a candidate for the Conservative Party in the Warwick East ward.)	1,339	67.3
Conservative	Leo Howlett (Note: Leo Howlett was elected in 1979 as a candidate for the Conservative Party in the Warwick East ward.)	1,258	63.2
Labour	Ross Beadle	327	16.4
Labour	Anthony Davison	308	15.5
Alliance	Cyril Hellberg	291	14.6
Alliance	David Ballard	287	14.4
Total valid votes		1,989	97.8
Rejected ballots		45	2.2
Turnout		2,034	48.2
Registered electors		4,221	
Conservative win (new seat)			
Conservative win (new seat)			

=== Warwick West ===
Warwick West (3 seats)
Party	Candidate	Votes	%
Labour	Agnes Leddy (Note: Agnes Leddy was elected in 1979 as a candidate for the Labour Party in the former Warwick West ward.)	1,333	47.1
Labour	James Savory	1,251	44.2
Conservative	Cherrie Chandley (Note: Cherrie Chandley was elected in 1979 as a candidate for the Conservative Party in the former Warwick West ward.)	1,230	43.4
Conservative	Frank Chandley	1,153	40.7
Labour	David Steed	1,088	38.4
Conservative	John Cross	977	34.5
Alliance	Albert Allan	363	12.8
Alliance	Anne Boyland	338	11.9
Alliance	Colin Aubury	333	11.8
Total valid votes		2,833	97.7
Rejected ballots		67	2.3
Turnout		2,900	49.1
Registered electors		5,909	
Labour win (new seat)			
Labour win (new seat)			
Conservative win (new seat)			

=== Whitnash ===
Whitnash (3 seats)
Party	Candidate	Votes	%
Ratepayers	Bernard Kirton (Note: Bernarnd Kirton was elected in 1979 as the candidate for the Ratepayers' Association in the former Whitnash ward.)	1,949	65.6
Ratepayers	Kathleen Crutchley	1,439	49.1
Ratepayers	Anthony Heath	1,348	46.0
Conservative	Harry Hughes	750	25.6
Conservative	Alasdair Cook	610	20.8
Conservative	Frederick Bremridge	597	20.4
Labour	Francis Ball	549	18.8
Labour	Rober Rae	505	17.2
Labour	Irene Adam	482	16.5
Total valid votes		2,928	98.0
Rejected ballots		59	2.0
Turnout		2,987	54.9
Registered electors		5,438	
Ratepayers win (new seat)			
Ratepayers win (new seat)			
Ratepayers win (new seat)			
