= 1987 Warwick District Council election =

1987 UK local government election

The 1987 Warwick District Council election was held on Thursday 7 May 1987 to elect all 45 members of Warwick District Council to a four-year term, the same day as other local elections in the United Kingdom. It was preceded by the 1983 election and followed by the 1991 election. The Conservative Party held control of the council.

== Results summary ==
1987 Warwick District Council election
Party	Seats	Net gain/loss	Seats %	Votes %	Votes	+/−
Conservative	29	▼2	64.4			
Labour	7	Steady	15.6			
Alliance	6	▲2	13.3			
Ratepayers	3	Steady	6.7			
Green	0	New	0.0			New
People's Independent Party (Warwick)	0	New	0.0			New

== Ward results ==
=== Bishop's Tachbrook ===
Bishop's Tachbrook (1 seat)
Party	Candidate	Votes	%	±%
Conservative	Leonard Leggett	808	61.1	▼38.9
Alliance	Clifford Harris	280	21.2	New
Labour	Marjorie Kruszenicki	234	17.7	New
Majority		528	39.9	N/A
Total valid votes		1,322		
Rejected ballots				
Turnout				
Registered electors				
Conservative hold		Swing	▼30.0	

=== Budbrooke ===
Budbrooke (1 seat)
Party	Candidate	Votes	%	±%
Conservative	Gordon Low	648	60.9	▲0.4
Alliance	John Haselgrove	269	25.3	▲0.9
Labour	David Griffin	147	13.8	▼1.3
Majority		379	35.6	▼0.5
Total valid votes		1,064	99.2	
Rejected ballots		9	0.8	
Turnout		1,073		
Registered electors				
Conservative hold		Swing	▼0.2	

=== Cubbington ===
Cubbington (2 seats)
Party	Candidate	Votes	%	±%
Conservative	Clifford Cleaver*	1,295		
Conservative	John Hammon*	1,103		
Ratepayers	David Saul	907		New
Ratepayers	Theresa Saul	602		New
Alliance	Godfrey Carr	314		
Alliance	Jennifer Mitchell-Black	278		
Labour	Roger Beckett	214		
Labour	Margaret Stacey	175		
Total valid votes				
Rejected ballots		12		
Turnout				
Registered electors				
Conservative hold				
Conservative hold				

=== Kenilworth Abbey ===
Kenilworth Abbey (3 seats)
Party	Candidate	Votes	%	±%
Conservative	Kenneth Rawnsley*	2,027		
Conservative	John Cooke*	2,025		
Conservative	Michael Coker*	1,989		
Alliance	Jack Bastock	1,887		
Alliance	Haydn Thomas	1,586		
Alliance	Mary Harrison	1,470		
Labour	Teresa Blackwell	400		
Labour	Garry Lucas	302		
Labour	Leonora Everitt	260		
Total valid votes				
Rejected ballots		29		
Turnout				
Registered electors				
Conservative hold				
Conservative hold				
Conservative hold				

=== Kenilworth Park Hill ===
Kenilworth Park Hill (2 seats)
Party	Candidate	Votes	%	±%
Conservative	Spencer Harrison*	1,189		
Conservative	Thomas Dalton	1,116		
Alliance	Kenneth Griffiths	689		
Alliance	Robert Butler*	649		
Labour	Lesley Bowen	242		
Labour	Anthony Bowen	240		
Total valid votes				
Rejected ballots		10		
Turnout				
Registered electors				
Conservative hold				
Conservative gain from Alliance				

=== Kenilworth St. John's ===
Kenilworth St. John's (3 seats)
Party	Candidate	Votes	%	±%
Conservative	Robert Wooller*	2,348		
Conservative	John Wilson*	2,334		
Conservative	James Whitby*	2,214		
Alliance	William Wozencroft	1,581		
Alliance	Dennis Royston	1,206		
Alliance	Vera Royston	1,187		
Labour	John Bennett	415		
Labour	John Payne	393		
Labour	Geoffrey Cleave	378		
Total valid votes				
Rejected ballots		9		
Turnout				
Registered electors				
Conservative hold				
Conservative hold				
Conservative hold				

=== Lapworth ===
Lapworth (1 seat)
Party	Candidate	Votes	%	±%
Conservative	Elizabeth Schofield	823	77.4	▼22.6
Alliance	Ronald Page	159	15.0	New
Labour	Patricia Ludgate	81	7.6	New
Majority		664	62.5	N/A
Total valid votes		1,063	99.9	
Rejected ballots		1	0.1	
Turnout		1,064		
Registered electors				
Conservative hold		Swing	▼18.8	

=== Leamington Brunswick ===
Leamington Brunswick (3 seats)
Party	Candidate	Votes	%	±%
Labour	Estelle Morris*	1,438		
Labour	David Nash	1,387		
Labour	Anthony Pickering	1,368		
Conservative	Jasbir Lall	560		
Conservative	Paula Goerres	508		
Conservative	Ian Lynch	505		
Alliance	Christopher Davis	439		
Alliance	Susan Elworthy	417		
Alliance	Philip Hodgkinson	390		
People's Independent Party	Geoffrey Wright	282		New
Total valid votes				
Rejected ballots		16		
Turnout				
Registered electors				
Labour hold				
Labour hold				
Labour hold				

=== Leamington Clarendon ===
Leamington Clarendon (3 seats)
Party	Candidate	Votes	%	±%
Conservative	Robert Coombes*	1,236		
Conservative	Sydney Ward*	1,129		
Conservative	Martin Harrison	1,124		
Labour	Robert Crowther	747		
Labour	Timothy Naylor	679		
Labour	Thomas Schuller	621		
Alliance	Sheila Grainger	484		
Alliance	Carolyn Voss	418		
Alliance	Andrew Patrick	416		
Green	Corrine Hurley	130		New
Total valid votes				
Rejected ballots		3		
Turnout				
Registered electors				
Conservative hold				
Conservative hold				
Conservative hold				

=== Leamington Crown ===
Leamington Crown (3 seats)
Party	Candidate	Votes	%	±%
Alliance	Alan Boad	920		
Alliance	Sarah Mullins	858		
Alliance	Patricia Wreford-Bush	857		
Labour	Humphrey Griffiths	841		
Labour	Cynthia Beckett	823		
Conservative	Patricia Robinson*	805		
Conservative	Brian Hales	784		
Conservative	Michael Kemp*	762		
Labour	David Steed	734		
Total valid votes				
Rejected ballots		6		
Turnout				
Registered electors				
Alliance gain from Conservative				
Alliance gain from Conservative				
Alliance gain from Conservative				

=== Leamington Manor ===
Leamington Manor (3 seats)
Party	Candidate	Votes	%	±%
Conservative	Peter Barton*	1,882		
Conservative	Stanley Birch*	1,844		
Conservative	John Higgins*	1,752		
Alliance	Roger Copping	1,225		
Alliance	Mary Moss	1,121		
Alliance	Susan Sell	1,052		
Labour	Richard Bicknell	294		
Labour	Susan Burt	259		
Labour	Kirsty Healey	256		
Green	Christopher Philpott	206		New
Total valid votes				
Rejected ballots		2		
Turnout				
Registered electors				
Conservative hold				
Conservative hold				
Conservative hold				

=== Leamington Milverton ===
Leamington Milverton (3 seats)
Party	Candidate	Votes	%	±%
Alliance	Valerie Davis*	1,742		
Alliance	Margaret Begg	1,709		
Alliance	Philip Emm*	1,612		
Conservative	Richard Bolton	1,079		
Conservative	John Isherwood	990		
Conservative	Clive Nelson	973		
Labour	Ian Henderson	424		
Labour	Roger Duclaud-Williams	405		
Labour	Paul Tallett	400		
Total valid votes				
Rejected ballots		9		
Turnout				
Registered electors				
Alliance hold				
Alliance hold				
Alliance hold				

=== Leamington Willes ===
Leamington Willes (3 seats)
Party	Candidate	Votes	%	±%
Conservative	Balraj Dhesi*	1,560		
Conservative	Edward Doyle	1,048		
Labour	Peter Byrd*	1,024		
Labour	Richard Chessum*	1,024		
Conservative	Gladys Cleland	973		
Labour	Constance Naylor	941		
Alliance	David Alexander	372		
Alliance	Freda Hawkins	329		
Alliance	Muhammad Khan	283		
Green	Janet Alty	209		New
Green	Thomas Taylor	176		New
Green	Alan Geary	175		New
Total valid votes				
Rejected ballots		4		
Turnout				
Registered electors				
Conservative hold				
Conservative gain from Labour				
Labour hold				

=== Leek Wootton ===
Leek Wootton (1 seat)
Party	Candidate	Votes	%	±%
Conservative	Josephine Compton*	868	81.6	▼18.4
Labour	Susan Byrd	196	18.4	New
Majority		672	63.2	N/A
Total valid votes		1,064	99.1	
Rejected ballots		10	0.9	
Turnout		1,074		
Registered electors				
Conservative hold		Swing	▼18.4	

=== Radford Semele ===
Radford Semele (1 seat)
Party	Candidate	Votes	%	±%
Conservative	Michael Doody (Note: Michael Doody unsuccessfully contested Radford Semele in the 1983 election as an independent candidate. The change in vote share, however, is calculated from the previous Conservative candidate.)	539	56.6	▲6.2
Alliance	Nichola Lomas	234	24.6	▲4.3
Labour	Stanley Sabin	179	18.8	▲7.5
Majority		305	32.0	▲1.9
Total valid votes		952	99.5	
Rejected ballots		5	0.5	
Turnout		957		
Registered electors				
Conservative hold		Swing	▲0.9	

=== Stoneleigh ===
Stoneleigh (1 seat)
Party	Candidate	Votes	%	±%
Conservative	Peter Simpson*	689	51.3	▼6.2
Alliance	Eric Deal	379	28.2	▼14.2
Labour	Timothy Robson	274	20.4	New
Majority		310	23.1	▲8.0
Total valid votes		1,342	99.9	
Rejected ballots		2	0.1	
Turnout		1,344		
Registered electors				
Conservative hold		Swing	▲4.0	

=== Warwick North ===
Warwick North (3 seats)
Party	Candidate	Votes	%	±%
Conservative	Alfred Boxley*	1,717		
Conservative	John Morley*	1,603		
Conservative	Margaret Walker	1,579		
Labour	Elaine Griffin	771		
Alliance	Ann Boyland	759		
Labour	Leslie Kent	759		
Labour	Richard Mills	736		
Alliance	Paul Murran	674		
Alliance	Gordon Doig	603		
Green	Alan King	171		New
Total valid votes				
Rejected ballots		17		
Turnout				
Registered electors				
Conservative hold				
Conservative hold				
Conservative hold				

=== Warwick South ===
Warwick South (2 seats)
Party	Candidate	Votes	%	±%
Conservative	Gerald Guest*	1,412		
Conservative	Leo Howlett*	1,387		
Alliance	Colin Aubury	552		
Alliance	Geoffrey Harris	488		
Labour	George Darmody	372		
Labour	Keith Kitto	345		
Green	Nicholas Anderson	164		New
Total valid votes				
Rejected ballots		21		
Turnout				
Registered electors				
Conservative hold				
Conservative hold				

=== Warwick West ===
Warwick West (3 seats)
Party	Candidate	Votes	%	±%
Labour	Agnes Leddy*	1,367		
Labour	James Savoury*	1,218		
Labour	Anthony Davison	1,047		
Conservative	Gertrude Holland	1,001		
Conservative	Greville Warwick	929		
Conservative	Patricia Miazga	737		
Alliance	Albert Allan	517		
Alliance	George Begg	404		
Alliance	Jennifer Patrick	367		
Green	Pamela King	161		New
Total valid votes				
Rejected ballots		34		
Turnout				
Registered electors				
Labour hold				
Labour hold				
Labour gain from Conservative				

=== Whitnash ===
Whitnash (3 seats)
Party	Candidate	Votes	%	±%
Ratepayers	Bernard Kirton	1,553		
Ratepayers	Kathleen Cruthcley	1,353		
Ratepayers	Anthony Heath	1,149		
Conservative	Margaret Bull	525		
Conservative	Dominic Coker	463		
Labour	Robert Woodward	443		
Labour	Denis Ward	440		
Conservative	Valerie Leigh-Hunt	428		
Labour	Margaret Baker	388		
Alliance	David Moss	136		
Alliance	Carole Eason	123		
Alliance	Margaret Watkins	120		
Total valid votes				
Rejected ballots		60		
Turnout				
Registered electors				
Ratepayers hold				
Ratepayers hold				
Ratepayers hold				
