= 1973 Warwick District Council election =

1973 UK local government election

The 1973 Warwick District Council election was held on Thursday 7 June 1973 to elect all 58 members of Warwick District Council, the same day as other local elections in the United Kingdom. It was the first election after the reforms to local government implemented by the Local Government Act 1972. The election was followed by the 1976 election. The council came under no overall control following the election.

== Results summary ==
1973 Warwick District Council election
Party	Seats	Net gain/loss	Seats %	Votes %	Votes	+/−
Conservative	26		44.8			
Labour	25		43.1			
Liberal	7		12.1			
Independent	0		0.0			

== Ward results ==
=== Ashow, Baginton, Bubbenhall and Stoneleigh ===
Ashow, Bagington, Bubenhall and Stoneleigh (1 seat)
Party	Candidate	Votes	%
Conservative	K.T. Dalton	Unopposed	
Registered electors		1,784	
Conservative win (new seat)			

=== Baddesley Clinton, Bushwood, Lapworth and Wroxall ===
Baddesley Clinton, Bushwood, Lapworth and Wroxall (1 seat)
Party	Candidate	Votes	%
Conservative	Thomas Kimpton	Unopposed	
Registered electors		1,510	
Conservative win (new seat)			

=== Barford, Norton Lindsey, Sherbourne and Wasperton ===
Barford, Norton Lindsey, Sherbourne and Wasperton (1 seat)
Party	Candidate	Votes	%
Conservative	Cecil Wilkins	Unopposed	
Registered electors		1,321	
Conservative win (new seat)			

=== Beausale, Guy's Cliffe, Haseley, Hatton, Honiley and Leek Wootton ===
Beausale, Guy's Cliffe, Haseley, Hatton, Honiley and Leek Wootton (1 seat)
Party	Candidate	Votes	%
Conservative	P.G. Butler	362	83.2
Labour	N. O'Nions	73	16.8
Majority		289	66.4
Total valid votes		435	33.6
Registered electors		1,293	
Conservative win (new seat)			

=== Bishop's Tachbrook ===
Bishop's Tachbrook (1 seat)
Party	Candidate	Votes	%
Conservative	James Evans	Unopposed	
Registered electors		1,187	
Conservative win (new seat)			

=== Blackdown, Eathorpe, Hunningham, Offchurch, Old Milverton, Wappenbury and Weston-Under-Wetherley ===
Blackdown, Eathorpe, Hunningham, Offchurch, Old Milverton, Wappenbury and Weston-Under-Wetherley (1 seat)
Party	Candidate	Votes	%
Conservative	John Hammon	352	77.5
Independent	H.D. Fern	102	22.5
Majority		250	55.1
Total valid votes		454	48.0
Registered electors		946	
Conservative win (new seat)			

=== Budbrooke ===
Budbrooke (1 seat)
Party	Candidate	Votes	%
Liberal	John Brown	320	50.8
Conservative	C.A. Goddard	223	35.4
Labour	I.C. Briggs	87	13.8
Majority		97	15.4
Total valid votes		630	42.8
Registered electors		1,471	
Liberal win (new seat)			

=== Cubbington ===
Cubbington (2 seats)
Party	Candidate	Votes	%
Conservative	Desmond Ellis	Unopposed	
Conservative	Thomas Nicholson	Unopposed	
Registered electors		3,177	
Conservative win (new seat)			
Conservative win (new seat)			

=== Kenilworth Abbey and Borrowell ===
Kenilworth Abbey and Borrowell (3 seats)
Party	Candidate	Votes	%
Liberal	Helen Dore	1,384	
Liberal	Jack Bastock	1,054	
Liberal	Haydn Thomas	928	
Conservative	D.F. Moore	870	
Conservative	D. Stansfield	867	
Conservative	E.M. Hogarth	697	
Labour	T. Litterick	283	
Labour	I.D. Barley	236	
Labour	G.G. Partington	206	
Total valid votes			58.5
Registered electors		4,334	
Liberal win (new seat)			
Liberal win (new seat)			
Liberal win (new seat)			

=== Kenilworth Castle ===
Kenilworth Castle (2 seats)
Party	Candidate	Votes	%
Conservative	Kenneth Rawnsley	749	
Conservative	D.L. Burbidge	728	
Liberal	D.A. Greenway	564	
Liberal	P.W. Simmonds	545	
Labour	J.E. Litterick	283	
Labour	B. Carroll	108	
Total valid votes			52.1
Registered electors		2,746	
Conservative win (new seat)			
Conservative win (new seat)			

=== Kenilworth Park Hill ===
Kenilworth Park Hill (2 seats)
Party	Candidate	Votes	%
Liberal	Robert Butler	650	
Liberal	George Bramwell	588	
Conservative	S.C. Harrison	586	
Conservative	K.W. Hogarth	569	
Labour	W.J.C Clarke	151	
Labour	S. Harris	132	
Total valid votes			55.8
Registered electors		2,484	
Liberal win (new seat)			
Liberal win (new seat)			

=== Kenilworth St. John's ===
Kenilworth St. John's (2 seats)
Party	Candidate	Votes	%
Labour	C.E. Webster	553	
Labour	William Wozencroft	500	
Liberal	T.S. Rogers	380	
Liberal	H.R. Martyr	376	
Conservative	E.I. Milligan	320	
Conservative	J. Rickard	316	
Total valid votes			52.8
Registered electors		2,371	
Labour win (new seat)			
Labour win (new seat)			

=== Kenilworth Windy Arbour ===
Kenilworth Windy Arbour (2 seats)
Party	Candidate	Votes	%
Conservative	John Wilson	872	
Conservative	Thomas Robinson	789	
Liberal	L. Pollard	447	
Liberal	J. Mokrzycki	404	
Labour	M.F. McLellan	106	
Labour	T. Swallow	95	
Total valid votes			54.9
Registered electors		2,597	
Conservative win (new seat)			
Conservative win (new seat)			

=== Leamington Albany ===
Leamington Albany (3 seats)
Party	Candidate	Votes	%
Conservative	Margaret Bull	620	
Liberal	Valerie Davis	614	
Conservative	J.H. Higgins	600	
Conservative	J.A.L Petit	577	
Liberal	B.W. Taylor	490	
Liberal	Patricia Turner	460	
Labour	K.A. Kamen	232	
Total valid votes			37.1
Registered electors		3,952	
Conservative win (new seat)			
Liberal win (new seat)			
Conservative win (new seat)			

=== Leamington Aylesford ===
Leamington Aylesford (3 seats)
Party	Candidate	Votes	%
Labour	Ian Frost	1,050	
Labour	M.G. Mellish	1,019	
Labour	Jopseph Reardon	1,012	
Conservative	V.G. Harding	426	
Conservative	P.T. Robins	401	
Conservative	M. Stimpson	379	
Total valid votes			34.9
Registered electors		4,226	
Labour win (new seat)			
Labour win (new seat)			
Labour win (new seat)			

=== Leamington Beverley ===
Leamington Beverley (2 seats)
Party	Candidate	Votes	%
Conservative	H.P. Bostock	761	
Conservative	Marshall Kerry	746	
Labour	Arthur Frost	177	
Labour	E.L. Goodman	174	
Total valid votes			31.8
Registered electors		2,953	
Conservative win (new seat)			
Conservative win (new seat)			

=== Leamington Campion ===
Leamington Campion (3 seats)
Party	Candidate	Votes	%
Conservative	Robert Coombes	785	
Conservative	Norman Parker	734	
Conservative	Thomas Williams	709	
Labour	M. Thomas	459	
Labour	J. Renshaw	450	
Labour	C.A. Pearce	422	
Liberal	H. Oxley	369	
Liberal	M.A. Harrison	362	
Total valid votes			38.6
Registered electors		4,174	
Conservative win (new seat)			
Conservative win (new seat)			
Conservative win (new seat)			

=== Leamington Crown ===
Leamington Crown (3 seats)
Party	Candidate	Votes	%
Labour	Norman Griffiths	885	
Labour	S.K. Robinson	817	
Labour	Barbara Kiybet	797	
Conservative	B.W. Hales	499	
Conservative	S.R. Ward	480	
Conservative	C.C. Murray	461	
Independent	G.J.W. Robbins	362	
Independent	L.L. Freeman	306	
Total valid votes			42.5
Registered electors		4,112	
Labour win (new seat)			
Labour win (new seat)			
Labour win (new seat)			

=== Leamington Kingsway ===
Leamington Kingsway (4 seats)
Party	Candidate	Votes	%
Labour	Peter Tombs	955	
Labour	Patricia Robinson	884	
Labour	J.P.W.B. McAuslan	860	
Labour	Walter Fowler	854	
Conservative	Josephine Doyle	441	
Conservative	J.H. Griffin	438	
Conservative	P.W. Dix	387	
Conservative	F.A. Bennett	351	
Total valid votes			30.4
Registered electors		4,597	
Labour win (new seat)			
Labour win (new seat)			
Labour win (new seat)			
Labour win (new seat)			

=== Leamington Manor ===
Leamington Manor (3 seats)
Party	Candidate	Votes	%
Conservative	Stanley Birch	1,049	
Conservative	Peter Barton	1,027	
Conservative	Gordon Swain	1,008	
Labour	Hannah Griffiths	341	
Labour	Kathleen Long	310	
Labour	J.W. Wilkinson	298	
Total valid votes			39.5
Registered electors		3,518	
Conservative win (new seat)			
Conservative win (new seat)			
Conservative win (new seat)			

=== Leamington Willes ===
Leamington Willes (3 seats)
Party	Candidate	Votes	%
Labour	Henry Kamen	964	
Labour	Michael Stockton	894	
Labour	N. Winterton	884	
Conservative	E. Gavan	864	
Conservative	G. Wilson	823	
Conservative	J.J. Clink	814	
Total valid votes			43.9
Registered electors		4,166	
Labour win (new seat)			
Labour win (new seat)			
Labour win (new seat)			

=== Radford Semele ===
Radford Semele (1 seat)
Party	Candidate	Votes	%
Conservative	James Critchley	324	51.8
Labour	P. Byrd	162	25.9
Independent	B. Payne	139	22.2
Majority		162	25.9
Total valid votes		625	47.9
Registered electors		1,306	
Conservative win (new seat)			

=== Rowington and Shrewley ===
Rowington and Shrewley (1 seat)
Party	Candidate	Votes	%
Conservative	B.M. Brown	Unopposed	
Registered electors		1,289	
Conservative win (new seat)			

=== Warwick Central ===
Warwick Central (2 seats)
Party	Candidate	Votes	%
Conservative	F.W. Hare	628	
Labour	D.J. Steed	541	
Conservative	Gerald Guest	536	
Labour	D.G. Bicknell	509	
Independent	J.A. Morley	398	
Liberal	A.G. Whiteheart	246	
Total valid votes			60.3
Registered electors		3,007	
Conservative win (new seat)			
Labour win (new seat)			

=== Warwick East ===
Warwick East (4 seats)
Party	Candidate	Votes	%
Labour	Bertie Charlett	1,116	
Labour	Leslie Kent	1,027	
Conservative	Leo Howlett	1,020	
Labour	G.W. Parsons	1,012	
Conservative	P. McMahon	1,000	
Labour	R.W. Powell	996	
Conservative	George Wilson	914	
Conservative	J.F. Wallsgrove	901	
Independent	R.R. King	761	
Liberal	M.E. Taylor	589	
Liberal	H.H. Tew	466	
Total valid votes			58.2
Registered electors		5,989	
Labour win (new seat)			
Labour win (new seat)			
Conservative win (new seat)			
Labour win (new seat)			

=== Warwick West ===
Warwick West (3 seats)
Party	Candidate	Votes	%
Labour	James Savory	1,092	
Labour	James McGrouther	1,090	
Labour	Agnes Leddy	1,059	
Conservative	M.J.R. King	531	
Conservative	C.H. Allman	517	
Conservative	L.G.M. Warren	497	
Liberal	A. Butcher	382	
Liberal	D.N. Norton	381	
Total valid votes			50.4
Registered electors		3,982	
Labour win (new seat)			
Labour win (new seat)			
Labour win (new seat)			

=== Whitnash ===
Whitnash (3 seats)
Party	Candidate	Votes	%
Labour	Bernard Kirton	1,203	
Labour	Thomas Smith	995	
Labour	S.C. Payne	953	
Conservative	J.M. Morris	776	
Conservative	H.D. Forster	775	
Conservative	J.R. Cleave	707	
Total valid votes			45.3
Registered electors		4,367	
Labour win (new seat)			
Labour win (new seat)			
Labour win (new seat)			
