= 1995 Warwick District Council election =

1995 UK local government election

The 1995 Warwick District Council election was held on Thursday 4 May 1995 to elect all 45 members of the Warwick District Council to a four-year term, the same day as other local elections in the United Kingdom. It was preceded by the 1991 election and followed the 1999 election. The Conservative Party lost control of the council to no overall control. Turnout across the council was 44.8%.

== Results summary ==
1995 Warwick District Council election
Party	Seats	Net gain/loss	Seats %	Votes %	Votes	+/−
Labour	17	▲7	37.8			
Conservative	13	▼11	26.7			
Liberal Democrats	11	▲3	24.4			
RA	3	Steady	6.7			
Independent	1	▲1	2.2			
Green	0	Steady	0.0			

== Ward results ==
=== Bishop's Tachbrook ===
Bishop's Tachbrook (1 seat)
Party	Candidate	Votes	%	±%
Labour	Richard Tamlin	541	47.7	▲15.0
Conservative	Leonard Leggett*	520	45.9	▼21.4
Green	Melanie Byng	72	6.4	New
Majority		21	1.9	N/A
Total valid votes		1,133	99.7	
Rejected ballots		3	0.3	
Turnout		1,136	43.4	▼1.4
Registered electors		2,616		
Labour gain from Conservative		Swing	▲18.2	

=== Budbrooke ===
Budbrooke (1 seat)
Party	Candidate	Votes	%	±%
Conservative	Christine Askew*	462	51.8	▼10.1
Labour	Timothy Hodgson	430	48.2	▲35.4
Majority		32	3.6	▼40.1
Total valid votes		892	99.4	
Rejected ballots		5	0.6	
Turnout		897	41.8	▼7.0
Registered electors		2,147		
Conservative hold		Swing	▼22.7	

=== Cubbington ===
Cubbington (2 seats)
Party	Candidate	Votes	%	±%
Conservative	Clifford Cleaver*	1,004	50.1	▼7.1
Conservative	John Hammon*	872	43.5	▼6.1
Labour	John Roberts	737	36.8	▲18.3
Labour	Julia Putt	596	29.7	▲12.7
Liberal Democrats	Godfey Carr	324	16.2	▼1.7
Liberal Democrats	Paul Taylor	181	9.0	▼8.1
Green	Nicola Kovacevic	71	3.5	▼2.1
Total valid votes		2,004	99.5	
Rejected ballots		11	0.5	
Turnout		2,015	45.7	▼4.1
Registered electors		4,406		
Conservative hold				
Conservative hold				

=== Kenilworth Abbey ===
Kenilworth Abbey (3 seats)
Party	Candidate	Votes	%	±%
Liberal Democrats	Jack Bastock*	1,763	53.8	▼0.8
Liberal Democrats	Haydn Thomas*	1,486	45.3	▲1.9
Liberal Democrats	Patrick Ryan	1,270	38.7	▲0.2
Conservative	Michael Coker	1,114	34.0	▼5.7
Conservative	James Finnie	904	27.6	▼8.7
Conservative	Terence Quainton	883	26.9	▼6.7
Labour	Rosemary Ellis	787	24.0	▲12.2
Labour	Geoffrey Cleave	761	23.2	▲12.4
Labour	Christopher Edgerton	719	21.9	▲11.2
Total valid votes		3,280	99.5	
Rejected ballots		18	0.5	
Turnout		3,298	52.5	▼6.0
Registered electors		6,287		
Liberal Democrats hold				
Liberal Democrats hold				
Liberal Democrats gain from Conservative				

=== Kenilworth Park Hill ===
Kenilworth Park Hill (2 seats)
Party	Candidate	Votes	%	±%
Liberal Democrats	David Shilton	665	37.3	▲4.1
Conservative	Spencer Harrison*	600	33.7	▼10.7
Labour	Muriel Johnston	511	28.7	▲7.8
Labour	Henry Scarbrough	489	27.4	▲8.3
Conservative	Thomas Dalton*	487	26.6	▼18.1
Liberal Democrats	Judith Rawson	471	26.4	▼5.0
Total valid votes		1,782	99.7	
Rejected ballots		5	0.3	
Turnout		1,787	48.6	▼2.1
Registered electors		3,679		
Liberal Democrats gain from Conservative				
Conservative hold				

=== Kenilworth St. John's ===
Kenilworth St. John's (3 seats)
Party	Candidate	Votes	%	±%
Conservative	Pauline Edwards*	1,694	47.5	▼8.2
Conservative	Robert Wooller*	1,613	45.2	▼6.6
Conservative	Leslie Windybank*	1,610	45.1	▼6.3
Labour	David Hatton	1,152	32.3	▲11.9
Labour	David Peggs	1,151	32.3	▲11.2
Labour	Jill Murdoch	1,107	31.0	▲10.9
Liberal Democrats	Richard Dickson	763	21.4	▼4.4
Liberal Democrats	Barbara Ward	729	20.4	▼5.8
Liberal Democrats	Graham Thomas	681	19.1	New
Total valid votes		3,567	99.5	
Rejected ballots		17	0.5	
Turnout		3,584	48.1	▼5.0
Registered electors		7,450		
Conservative hold				
Conservative hold				
Conservative hold				

=== Lapworth ===
Lapworth (1 seat)
Party	Candidate	Votes	%	±%
Conservative	Leslie Caborn*	587	65.9	▼15.7
Labour	Nicholas Holmes	175	19.6	▲1.2
Liberal Democrats	Gillian Taylor	129	14.5	New
Majority		412	46.2	▼16.9
Total valid votes		891	99.4	
Rejected ballots		5	0.6	
Turnout		896	37.1	▼4.2
Registered electors		2,415		
Conservative hold		Swing	▼8.5	

=== Leamington Brunswick ===
Leamington Brunswick (3 seats)
Party	Candidate	Votes	%	±%
Labour	Joyce Evans*	1,743	72.7	▲9.2
Labour	Ian Dove*	1,673	69.8	▲10.8
Labour	Balvinder Gill*	1,621	67.7	▲10.6
Green	Paul Baptie	275	11.5	▲2.1
Conservative	John Martin	270	11.3	▼3.2
Conservative	Margaret Cherry	253	10.6	▼8.9
Conservative	Mavis Milne	203	8.5	▼7.7
Total valid votes		2,396	99.6	
Rejected ballots		10	0.4	
Turnout		2,406	38.8	▼3.0
Registered electors		6,201		
Labour hold				
Labour hold				
Labour hold				

=== Leamington Clarendon ===
Leamington Clarendon (3 seats)
Party	Candidate	Votes	%	±%
Labour	Robert Crowther*	1,208	56.9	▲18.0
Labour	George Darmody*	1,132	53.3	▲17.9
Labour	William Evans	1,050	49.5	▲14.7
Conservative	Pamela Davis	618	29.1	▼6.0
Conservative	Yvonne Taylor	572	27.0	▼4.7
Conservative	Barry Thorpe-Smith	562	26.5	▼4.9
Liberal Democrats	Andrew Patrick	201	9.5	▼1.3
Liberal Democrats	Thomas Winnifrith	176	8.3	▼3.0
Liberal Democrats	Albert Whitehart	161	7.6	▼2.3
Green	Penelope Walker	139	6.6	▼4.7
Total valid votes		2,122	99.8	
Rejected ballots		4	0.2	
Turnout		2,126	48.5	▼2.1
Registered electors		4,381		
Labour hold				
Labour hold				
Labour gain from Conservative				

=== Leamington Crown ===
Leamington Crown (3 seats)
Party	Candidate	Votes	%	±%
Liberal Democrats	Sarah Boad*	1,090	48.6	▼6.4
Liberal Democrats	Alan Boad*	1,060	47.3	▼7.4
Labour	Humphrey Griffiths	926	41.3	▲15.5
Liberal Democrats	Clifford Harris*	919	41.0	▼8.7
Labour	David Phillips	852	38.0	▲13.6
Labour	Kathleen Way	800	35.7	▲12.5
Conservative	Jonathan Banham	159	7.1	▼12.0
Conservative	Elaine Lees	145	6.5	▼11.9
Conservative	James Leyland	133	5.9	▼9.2
Green	Alan Paxton	65	2.9	New
Total valid votes		2,241	99.4	
Rejected ballots		14	0.6	
Turnout		2,255	51.7	▼0.7
Registered electors		4,362		
Liberal Democrats hold				
Liberal Democrats hold				
Labour gain from Liberal Democrats				

=== Leamington Manor ===
Leamington Manor (3 seats)
Party	Candidate	Votes	%	±%
Liberal Democrats	David Kohler	1,181	37.6	▲9.5
Liberal Democrats	Roger Copping	1,120	35.7	▲8.7
Conservative	Teresa Bayliss*	1,018	32.4	▼14.7
Conservative	John Higgins*	1,016	32.4	▼13.7
Liberal Democrats	Helen Winnifrith	1,010	32.2	▲4.4
Conservative	Sadhu Mangat	867	27.6	▼20.4
Labour	Kathleen Long	681	21.7	▲8.7
Labour	Reginald Long	639	20.4	▲7.4
Labour	Timothy William	631	20.1	▲7.9
Green	Janet Alty	223	7.1	▼4.5
Green	Nicette Ammar	88	2.8	▼3.3
Total valid votes		3,139	99.9	
Rejected ballots		4	0.1	
Turnout		3,143	50.06	▼1.4
Registered electors		6,279		
Liberal Democrats gain from Conservative				
Liberal Democrats gain from Conservative				
Conservative hold				

=== Leamington Milverton ===
Leamington Milverton (3 seats)
Party	Candidate	Votes	%	±%
Liberal Democrats	Margaret Begg*	1,427	53.7	▼0.4
Liberal Democrats	Christopher Davis*	1,315	49.5	▲0.1
Liberal Democrats	William Gifford	1,210	45.5	▼0.5
Conservative	Julie Johannessen	669	25.2	▼5.4
Labour	Melanie Jones	661	24.9	▲8.9
Conservative	Geoffrey Wilson	654	24.6	▼4.8
Conservative	Sarah Martin	652	24.5	▼7.4
Labour	Michael Rigby	593	22.3	▲11.3
Labour	Kevin Kaysworth	591	22.2	▲12.1
Green	David Bevan	200	7.5	▲0.5
Total valid votes		2,657	100.0	
Rejected ballots		0	0.0	
Turnout		2,657	43.3	▼10.8
Registered electors		6,139		
Liberal Democrats hold				
Liberal Democrats hold				
Liberal Democrats hold				

=== Leamington Willes ===
Leamington Willes (3 seats)
Party	Candidate	Votes	%	±%
Labour	Peter Byrd*	1,596	59.7	▲18.1
Labour	Chanan Aujla	1,566	58.6	▲24.5
Labour	Cheryl Flanagan*	1,563	58.5	▲24.1
Conservative	Balraj Dhesi*	972	36.4	▼0.1
Conservative	Isobel Brown	424	15.9	▼9.1
Conservative	John Sheehan	335	12.5	▼9.5
Liberal Democrats	George Begg	279	10.4	New
Green	Andrew Stevenson	242	9.1	▲0.9
Liberal Democrats	Alan Ward	223	8.3	New
Total valid votes		2,672	100.0	
Rejected ballots		0	0.0	
Turnout		2,672	43.7	▼8.6
Registered electors		6,121		
Labour hold				
Labour gain from Conservative				
Labour hold				

=== Leek Wootton ===
Leek Wootton (1 seat)
Party	Candidate	Votes	%	±%
Conservative	Josephine Compton*	546	65.0	▼12.4
Labour	David Light	294	35.0	▲12.4
Majority		252	30.0	▼24.8
Total valid votes		840	100.0	
Rejected ballots		0	0.0	
Turnout		840	39.4	▼9.8
Registered electors		2,130		
Conservative hold		Swing	▼12.4	

=== Radford Semele ===
Radford Semele (1 seat)
Party	Candidate	Votes	%	±%
Conservative	Michael Doody*	333	39.1	▼16.1
Labour	Fiona Walsh	321	37.7	▲15.6
Liberal Democrats	David Evans	171	20.1	▼2.7
Green	Alan Geary	27	3.2	New
Majority		12	1.4	▼30.9
Total valid votes		852	99.1	
Rejected ballots		8	0.9	
Turnout		860	45.6	▼2.9
Registered electors		1,888		
Conservative hold		Swing	▼15.9	

=== Stoneleigh ===
Stoneleigh (1 seat)
Party	Candidate	Votes	%	±%
Conservative	Paul Barrett	460	53.4	▼12.0
Labour	Jacqueline Grayson	402	46.6	▲12.0
Majority		58	6.7	▼24.1
Total valid votes		862	99.4	
Rejected ballots		5	0.6	
Turnout		867	34.8	▼16.3
Registered electors		2,489		
Conservative hold		Swing	▼12.0	

=== Warwick North ===
Warwick North (3 seats)
Party	Candidate	Votes	%	±%
Labour	Jennifer Clayton	1,999	65.5	▲29.6
Labour	William Brister	1,893	62.0	▲26.7
Labour	Michael Dray	1,893	62.0	▲31.2
Conservative	Alfred Boxley*	805	26.4	▼14.8
Conservative	John Walker*	730	23.9	▼14.5
Conservative	Margaret Walker*	711	23.3	▼14.2
Liberal Democrats	Brenda Murran	403	13.2	▼4.1
Green	Juliet Nickels	213	7.0	▼4.6
Total valid votes		3,051	98.7	
Rejected ballots		41	1.3	
Turnout		3,092	46.4	▲1.7
Registered electors		6,664		
Labour gain from Conservative				
Labour gain from Conservative				
Labour gain from Conservative				

=== Warwick South ===
Warwick South (2 seats)
Party	Candidate	Votes	%	±%
Independent	Anne Hodgetts	947	43.8	▲4.1
Conservative	Gerald Guest*	658	30.4	▼16.2
Conservative	James Dalgleish	644	29.8	▼13.0
Independent	Geoffrey Holroyde	640	29.6	New
Labour	Karen Allinson	638	29.5	▲11.1
Labour	Geoffrey Lee	563	26.0	▲9.0
Green	Dominic Francocci	98	4.5	▼8.1
Total valid votes		2,164	99.2	
Rejected ballots		18	0.8	
Turnout		2,182	43.3	▼4.5
Registered electors		5,044		
Independent gain from Conservative				
Conservative hold				

=== Warwick West ===
Warwick West (3 seats)
Party	Candidate	Votes	%	±%
Labour	Agnes Leddy*	1,625	70.9	▲12.0
Labour	Robert Attwood*	1,480	64.6	▲15.1
Labour	Leslie Kent	1,419	61.9	▲8.8
Conservative	Gertrude Holland	554	24.2	▼11.2
Conservative	Margaret Dodd	516	22.5	▼5.8
Conservative	Robert Hancock	495	21.6	▼10.5
Liberal Democrats	Paul Murran	278	12.1	New
Green	Michael Davies	174	7.6	▼11.0
Total valid votes		2,292	98.6	
Rejected ballots		33	1.4	
Turnout		2,325	39.8	▼3.9
Registered electors		5,837		
Labour hold				
Labour hold				
Labour hold				

=== Whitnash ===
Whitnash (3 seats)
Party	Candidate	Votes	%	±%
RA	Bernard Kirton*	1,399	63.9	▼6.9
RA	Joseph Short*	941	43.0	▼11.5
RA	Peter Jackson	871	39.8	▼17.4
Labour	Paul Hamilton	741	33.8	▲17.5
Labour	Neil Roberts	637	29.1	▲14.5
Labour	Makhan Purewal	595	27.2	▲14.2
Conservative	Daisy Mills	326	14.9	▼6.6
Conservative	Richard Harding	262	12.0	▼0.8
Conservative	Edward Walker	190	8.7	▼4.0
Green	Hannah Sassoon	84	3.8	▼2.5
Total valid votes		2,190	98.2	
Rejected ballots		41	1.8	
Turnout		2,231	40.6	▼7.7
Registered electors		5,496		
RA hold				
RA hold				
RA hold				
