= 1979 Warwick District Council election =

1979 UK local government election

The 1979 Warwick District Council election was held on Thursday 3 May 1979 to elect all 58 members of Warwick District Council to a four-year term, the same day as other local elections in the United Kingdom and the general election. It was preceded by the 1976 election and followed by the 1983 election. The Conservative Party held control of the council. Turnout across the council was 77.5%.

== Results summary ==
1979 Warwick District Council election
Party	Seats	Net gain/loss	Seats %	Votes %	Votes	+/−
Conservative	40	▼1	69.0			
Labour	13	▼1	22.4			
Liberal	4	▲1	6.9			
Ratepayers	1	▲1	1.7			
Independent	0	Steady	0.0			

== Ward results ==
=== Ashow, Baginton, Bubbenhall and Stoneleigh ===
Ashow, Bagington, Bubenhall and Stoneleigh (1 seat)
Party	Candidate	Votes	%	±%
Conservative	Peter Simpson	1,425	67.9	▲13.5
Labour	Goeffrey Renshaw	675	32.1	▲8.9
Majority		750	35.7	▲4.6
Total valid votes		2,100	99.3	
Rejected ballots		14	0.7	
Turnout		2,114	75.4	▲23.7
Registered electors		2,802		
Conservative hold		Swing	▲2.3	

=== Baddesley Clinton, Bushwood, Lapworth and Wroxall ===
Baddesley Clinton, Bushwood, Lapworth and Wroxall (1 seat)
Party	Candidate	Votes	%	±%
Conservative	Thomas Kimpton*	1,002	82.7	▼6.2
Labour	Ann Caldwell	209	17.3	▲6.2
Majority		793	65.5	▼12.4
Total valid votes		1,211	99.1	
Rejected ballots		11	0.9	
Turnout		1,222	78.1	▲30.1
Registered electors		1,564		
Conservative hold		Swing	▼6.2	

=== Barford, Norton Lindsey, Sherbourne and Wasperton ===
Barford, Norton Lindsey, Sherbourne and Wasperton (1 seat)
Party	Candidate	Votes	%	±%
Conservative	Cecil Wilkins*	947	86.4	▼4.1
Labour	Janet Renshaw	149	13.6	▲4.1
Majority		798	72.8	▼8.1
Total valid votes		1,096	98.8	
Rejected ballots		13	1.2	
Turnout		1,109	82.5	▲27.5
Registered electors		1,344		
Conservative hold		Swing	▼4.1	

=== Beausale, Guy's Cliffe, Haseley, Hatton, Honiley and Leek Wootton ===
Beausale, Guy's Cliffe, Haseley, Hatton, Honiley and Leek Wootton (1 seat)
Party	Candidate	Votes	%	±%
Conservative	John Walker	878	79.6	▲4.3
Labour	Alice Armstrong	225	20.4	▲13.3
Majority		653	59.2	▲1.6
Total valid votes		1,103	98.4	
Rejected ballots		16	1.4	
Turnout		1,121	74.09	
Registered electors		1,513		
Conservative hold		Swing	▼4.5	

=== Bishop's Tachbrook ===
Bishop's Tachbrook (1 seat)
Party	Candidate	Votes	%	±%
Conservative	James Evans*	486	48.3	▼9.2
Liberal	William Hopkins	281	27.9	▲5.2
Labour	Jean O'Neill	240	23.8	▲4.0
Majority		205	20.4	▼14.3
Total valid votes		1,007	99.1	
Rejected ballots		8	0.8	
Turnout		1,016	80.0	▲30.2
Registered electors		1,270		
Conservative hold		Swing	▼7.2	

=== Blackdown, Eathorpe, Hunningham, Offchurch, Old Milverton, Wappenbury and Weston-Under-Wetherley ===
Blackdown, Eathorpe, Hunningham, Offchurch, Old Milverton, Wappenbury and Weston-Under-Wetherley (1 seat)
Party	Candidate	Votes	%	±%
Conservative	John Hammon*	563	80.7	▼2.6
Labour	Reginald Long	135	19.3	▲2.6
Majority		428	61.3	▼5.1
Total valid votes		698	98.2	
Rejected ballots		12	1.7	
Turnout		711	81.6	▲30.9
Registered electors		871		
Conservative hold		Swing	▼2.6	

=== Budbrooke ===
Budbrooke (1 seat)
Party	Candidate	Votes	%	±%
Conservative	John Brown* (Note: John Brown was elected in 1976 as the candidate for the Liberal Party, but ran for reelection as the candidate for the Conservative Party.)	685	55.0	▲20.4
Liberal	John Haselgrove	425	34.1	▼21.1
Labour	Paul Weller	136	10.9	▲0.7
Majority		260	20.9	N/A
Total valid votes		1,246	98.3	
Rejected ballots		21	1.7	
Turnout		1,267	82.6	▲30.8
Registered electors		1,533		
Conservative gain from Liberal		Swing	▲20.7	

=== Cubbington ===
Cubbington (2 seats)
Party	Candidate	Votes	%	±%
Conservative	Clifford Cleaver	1,887	72.7	▲6.0
Conservative	Thomas Shevlin	1,653	63.7	▼0.8
Labour	Charles Jones	653	25.2	▼6.3
Labour	Linda Jones	598	23.0	▼4.0
Total valid votes		2,595	99.0	
Rejected ballots		25	1.0	
Turnout		2,620	81.5	▲34.3
Registered electors		3,216		
Conservative hold				
Conservative hold				

=== Kenilworth Abbey and Borrowell ===
Kenilworth Abbey and Borrowell (3 seats)
Party	Candidate	Votes	%	±%
Liberal	Helen Dore*	1,986	57.3	▲3.9
Liberal	Jack Bastock*	1,795	51.8	▲4.9
Liberal	Haydn Thomas	1,387	40.0	▲4.9
Conservative	Kenneth Hogarth*	1,340	38.7	▼8.1
Conservative	Ronald Stansfield	1,245	35.9	▼2.4
Conservative	Nicholas Wilson	1,141	32.9	▼3.1
Labour	Wendy England	474	13.7	▲3.1
Labour	Susan O'Donovan	322	9.3	▲1.7
Labour	Colleen Ramsey	259	7.5	▼2.5
Total valid votes		3,467	99.8	
Rejected ballots		7	0.2	
Turnout		3,474	81.0	▲21.0
Registered electors		4,287		
Liberal hold				
Liberal hold				
Liberal gain from Conservative				

=== Kenilworth Castle ===
Kenilworth Castle (2 seats)
Party	Candidate	Votes	%	±%
Conservative	Michael Coker*	1,277	56.6	▼4.2
Conservative	Kenneth Rawnsley*	1,199	53.2	▼12.6
Liberal	Leslie Windybank	699	31.0	▼0.3
Liberal	David Preece	681	30.2	▲2.6
Labour	Thomas Swallow	166	7.4	▲1.6
Labour	Gordon Mitchell	161	7.1	▲1.6
Total valid votes		2,255	99.3	
Rejected ballots		16	0.7	
Turnout		2,271	82.1	▲22.9
Registered electors		2,765		
Conservative hold				
Conservative hold				

=== Kenilworth Park Hill ===
Kenilworth Park Hill (2 seats)
Party	Candidate	Votes	%	±%
Liberal	Robert Butler	1,080	48.3	▲6.7
Conservative	Spencer Harrison	968	43.3	▼12.1
Conservative	Kenneth Bulmer	922	41.2	▼8.5
Liberal	Kenneth Evans	869	38.9	▲0.6
Labour	Peter Jones	249	11.1	▲4.5
Labour	Peter Singer	222	9.9	▲2.9
Total valid votes		2,236	100.0	
Rejected ballots		1	0.0	
Turnout		2,237	83.3	▲18.8
Registered electors		2,684		
Liberal gain from Conservative				
Conservative hold				

=== Kenilworth St. John's ===
Kenilworth St. John's (2 seats)
Party	Candidate	Votes	%	±%
Labour	William Wozencroft*	790	43.6	▲4.5
Conservative	Richard Monnington*	710	39.1	▼0.1
Conservative	Robert Wooller	678	37.4	▼1.2
Labour	Malcolm Burfitt	566	31.2	▲0.7
Liberal	Mary Archer	377	20.8	▼3.9
Liberal	Leonard Davis	354	19.5	▼2.1
Total valid votes		1,814	99.9	
Rejected ballots		2	0.1	
Turnout		1,816	81.0	▲16.8
Registered electors		2,241		
Labour hold				
Conservative hold				

=== Kenilworth Windy Arbour ===
Kenilworth Windy Arbour (2 seats)
Party	Candidate	Votes	%	±%
Conservative	John Wilson*	1,381	63.2	▼5.5
Conservative	James Whitby	1,282	58.7	▼6.6
Liberal	Lynn Pollard	601	27.5	▼1.7
Liberal	Stephen Adams	524	24.0	▲0.3
Labour	Joseph England	213	9.8	▲5.0
Labour	Elizabeth Lee	176	8.1	▲3.5
Total valid votes		2,184	99.5	
Rejected ballots		10	0.5	
Turnout		2,194	84.1	▲19.2
Registered electors		2,609		
Conservative hold				
Conservative hold				

=== Leamington Albany ===
Leamington Albany (3 seats)
Party	Candidate	Votes	%	±%
Conservative	Margaret Bull*	1,105	42.5	▼10.3
Conservative	Christopher Clark*	1,090	42.0	▼6.1
Conservative	George Cox	1,047	40.3	▼9.6
Liberal	Valerie Davis	828	31.9	▼1.2
Liberal	Patricia Turner	716	27.6	▲4.4
Liberal	Peter White	621	23.9	▲2.9
Labour	Roger Grenville	602	23.2	▲4.3
Labour	Colin Hitchmough	564	21.7	▲3.1
Labour	Simon Walton	549	21.1	▲2.8
Total valid votes		2,597	99.0	
Rejected ballots		25	1.0	
Turnout		2,622	69.9	▲30.3
Registered electors		3,752		
Conservative hold				
Conservative hold				
Conservative hold				

=== Leamington Aylesford ===
Leamington Aylesford (3 seats)
Party	Candidate	Votes	%	±%
Labour	Harrie Porter	2,027	56.2	▲1.1
Labour	Brian Weekes*	2,027	56.2	▲6.0
Labour	John Thurlow	1,964	54.5	▲0.5
Conservative	Edward Curtis	955	26.5	▼3.7
Conservative	Bryan Tandy	882	24.5	▼3.8
Conservative	Robert Johnston	849	23.6	▼3.2
Liberal	Ian Taylor	524	14.5	▲2.4
Liberal	Charles Bevan	485	13.5	▲3.3
Total valid votes		3,605	99.1	
Rejected ballots		34	0.9	
Turnout		3,639	74.6	▲27.9
Registered electors		4,877		
Labour hold				
Labour hold				
Labour hold				

=== Leamington Beverley ===
Leamington Beverley (2 seats)
Party	Candidate	Votes	%	±%
Conservative	Marshall Kerry*	1,495	60.7	▼1.1
Conservative	John Higgins*	1,492	60.6	▲0.3
Liberal	Roger Copping	560	22.7	▼3.2
Liberal	David Alexander	483	19.6	▼5.8
Labour	Malcolm Fraser	377	15.3	▲6.0
Labour	Arthur Frost	357	14.5	▲5.5
Total valid votes		2,464	99.4	
Rejected ballots		16	0.6	
Turnout		2,480	79.1	▲28.7
Registered electors		3,135		
Conservative hold				
Conservative hold				

=== Leamington Campion ===
Leamington Campion (3 seats)
Party	Candidate	Votes	%	±%
Conservative	Robert Coombes*	1,687	58.6	▲0.3
Conservative	Norman Parker*	1,591	55.3	▼2.0
Conservative	Thomas Williams*	1,553	54.0	▼2.6
Labour	Paul Hamilton	960	33.4	▲10.9
Labour	Jane Milburn	934	32.5	▲10.3
Labour	George Owen	890	30.9	▲9.2
Total valid votes		2,878	98.8	
Rejected ballots		36	1.2	
Turnout		2,914	71.8	▲31.7
Registered electors		4,061		
Conservative hold				
Conservative hold				
Conservative hold				

=== Leamington Crown ===
Leamington Crown (3 seats)
Party	Candidate	Votes	%	±%
Labour	Humphrey Griffiths*	1,614	47.7	▼3.2
Labour	David Talbot	1,372	40.5	▼9.4
Labour	Julia Weare	1,294	38.2	▼10.9
Conservative	Patricia Robinson	1,291	38.1	▼6.7
Conservative	Teresa Bayliss	1,149	33.9	▼9.4
Conservative	William Cleland	1,135	33.5	▼9.7
Liberal	Alan Boad	888	26.2	New
Total valid votes		3,385	99.4	
Rejected ballots		22	0.6	
Turnout		3,407	75.7	▲34.5
Registered electors		4,561		
Labour hold				
Labour hold				
Labour hold				

=== Leamington Kingsway ===
Leamington Kingsway (4 seats)
Party	Candidate	Votes	%	±%
Labour	David Caldwell	1,948	61.6	▲8.7
Labour	John McAuslan	1,817	57.4	▲5.4
Labour	Estelle Morris	1,809	57.2	▲6.3
Labour	Michael Stockton	1,725	54.5	▲4.4
Conservative	Norman Hill	1,060	33.5	▼5.7
Conservative	Lincoln Allison	1,053	33.3	▼2.1
Conservative	Anthony Parsons	993	31.4	▼3.4
Conservative	William Payne-Jeremiah	887	28.0	▼6.6
Total valid votes		3,164	99.0	
Rejected ballots		31	1.0	
Turnout		3,195	69.8	▲33.0
Registered electors		4,576		
Labour hold				
Labour hold				
Labour hold				
Labour hold				

=== Leamington Manor ===
Leamington Manor (3 seats)
Party	Candidate	Votes	%	±%
Conservative	Stanley Birch*	2,110	75.7	▲10.7
Conservative	Peter Barton*	2,073	74.4	▲13.1
Conservative	Gordon Swain*	2,015	72.3	▲15.0
Labour	Hannah Griffiths	574	20.6	▲4.0
Labour	Kenneth Knight	447	16.0	▲0.7
Labour	Kathleen Long	437	15.7	▲2.5
Total valid votes		2,787	98.9	
Rejected ballots		32	1.1	
Turnout		2,819	79.4	▲26.5
Registered electors		3,550		
Conservative hold				
Conservative hold				
Conservative hold				

=== Leamington Willes ===
Leamington Willes (3 seats)
Party	Candidate	Votes	%	±%
Conservative	Edward Doyle*	1,162	38.4	▼16.6
Conservative	Roy Charles*	1,096	36.2	▼15.9
Labour	John Benyon	1,060	35.0	▼3.0
Conservative	Sydney Ward*	1,007	33.3	▼13.7
Labour	Ian Henderson	976	32.3	▼3.7
Labour	David Palfreyman	934	30.9	▼5.0
Liberal	Timothy Bick	700	23.1	New
Liberal	Alan Geary	696	23.0	New
Liberal	Clifford Harris	660	21.8	New
Total valid votes		3,025	98.5	
Rejected ballots		47	1.5	
Turnout		3,072	75.6	▲28.1
Registered electors		4,065		
Conservative hold				
Conservative hold				
Labour gain from Conservative				

=== Radford Semele ===
Radford Semele (1 seat)
Party	Candidate	Votes	%	±%
Conservative	Russell Lane	603	48.3	▼27.0
Independent	Michael Doody	447	35.8	New
Labour	Molly Brearley	199	15.9	▼8.8
Majority		156	12.5	▼38.0
Total valid votes		1,249	98.6	
Rejected ballots		18	1.4	
Turnout		1,267	82.5	▲35.9
Registered electors		1,535		
Conservative hold		Swing	▼31.4	

=== Rowington and Shrewley ===
Rowington and Shrewley (1 seat)
Party	Candidate	Votes	%	±%
Conservative	John Jarrett*	922	85.3	▼2.2
Labour	Vincent Arkell	159	14.7	▲8.3
Majority		763	70.6	▼10.5
Total valid votes		1,081	98.2	
Rejected ballots		20	1.8	
Turnout		1,101	81.4	▲31.1
Registered electors		1,353		
Conservative hold		Swing	▼5.3	

=== Warwick Central ===
Warwick Central (2 seats)
Party	Candidate	Votes	%	±%
Conservative	John Morley*	1,215	57.0	▲3.2
Conservative	Richard Tilden-Smith	1,084	50.9	▼3.2
Labour	John Mooney	776	36.4	▼5.7
Labour	Ian Briggs	746	35.0	▼7.4
Total valid votes		2,130	98.9	
Rejected ballots		23	1.1	
Turnout		2,153	72.4	▲21.7
Registered electors		2,972		
Conservative hold				
Conservative hold				

=== Warwick East ===
Warwick East (4 seats)
Party	Candidate	Votes	%	±%
Conservative	Vanessa Gray	3,501	52.5	▲5.4
Conservative	Gerald Guest*	3,234	48.5	▲2.1
Conservative	Leo Howlett*	3,108	46.6	▲0.3
Conservative	George Wilson*	3,088	46.3	▲3.6
Labour	William Fern	1,825	27.4	▼11.1
Labour	Elizabeth Buckby	1,802	27.0	▼11.4
Labour	David Deaton	1,756	26.3	▼9.4
Liberal	Alan Bevan	1,636	24.5	▲10.9
Labour	Helen Vitali	1,478	22.2	▼13.1
Liberal	Cyril Hellberg	1,408	21.1	▲8.3
Total valid votes		6,670	99.1	
Rejected ballots		58	0.9	
Turnout		6,728	75.6	▲30.3
Registered electors		8,896		
Conservative hold				
Conservative hold				
Conservative hold				
Conservative hold				

=== Warwick West ===
Warwick West (3 seats)
Party	Candidate	Votes	%	±%
Conservative	Cherrie Chandley*	1,622	50.3	▼1.5
Labour	Agnes Leddy*	1,556	48.3	▼0.4
Conservative	Dennis Rowley	1,426	44.2	▼6.4
Conservative	Alfred Boxley	1,328	41.2	▼5.3
Labour	James Savory	1,307	40.5	▼3.7
Labour	Richard Perry	1,160	36.0	▼6.3
Total valid votes		3,224	99.4	
Rejected ballots		19	0.6	
Turnout		3,243	79.4	▲30.6
Registered electors		4,084		
Conservative hold				
Labour hold				
Conservative hold				

=== Whitnash ===
Whitnash (3 seats)
Party	Candidate	Votes	%	±%
Ratepayers	Bernard Kirton* (Note: Bernard Kirton was elected in 1976 as a candidate for the Labour Party, but ran for reelection as a candidate for the Ratepayers Party.)	2,954	71.4	New
Conservative	John Morris	1,565	37.8	▼7.5
Conservative	David Mann*	1,523	36.8	▼10.8
Conservative	Alasdair Cook	1,232	29.8	▼12.4
Labour	Patrick Burke	1,032	25.0	▼32.5
Labour	Trevor Fletcher	1,015	24.5	▼22.8
Labour	Tarsem Nayyar	559	13.5	▼26.0
Total valid votes		4,135	99.5	
Rejected ballots		21	0.5	
Turnout		4,156	83.4	▲34.2
Registered electors		4,985		
Ratepayers gain from Labour				
Conservative gain from Labour				
Conservative hold				
