= 1991 Warwick District Council election =

1991 UK local government election

The 1991 Warwick District Council election was held on Thursday 2 May 1991 to elect all 45 members of Warwick District Council to a four-year term, the same days as other local elections in the United Kingdom. It was preceded by the 1987 election and followed by the 1995 election. The Conservative Party held control of the council after the election. Turnout across the council was 49.5%.

== Results summary ==
1991 Warwick District Council election
Party	Seats	Net gain/loss	Seats %	Votes %	Votes	+/−
Conservative	24	▼5	53.3			
Labour	10	▲3	22.2			
Liberal Democrats	8	▲2	17.8			
RA	3	Steady	6.7			
Green	0	Steady	0.0			
Leamington Town Forum	0	New	0.0			New
Independent	0	Steady	0.0			

== Ward results ==
=== Bishop's Tachbrook ===
Bishop's Tachbrook (1 seat)
Party	Candidate	Votes	%	±%
Conservative	Leonard Leggett*	768	67.3	▲6.1
Labour	Norman Griffiths	374	32.7	▲15.
Majority		394	34.5	▼5.4
Total valid votes		1,142	99.4	
Rejected ballots		7	0.6	
Turnout		1,149	44.8	
Registered electors		2,562		
Conservative hold		Swing	▼4.5	

=== Budbrooke ===
Budbrooke (1 seat)
Party	Candidate	Votes	%	±%
Conservative	Christine Askew	603	61.8	▲0.9
Independent	Allan Burbidge	177	18.2	New
Labour	Virginia Dalgarno	125	12.8	▼1.0
Green	Thomas Taylor	70	7.2	New
Majority		426	43.7	▲8.1
Total valid votes		975	98.8	
Rejected ballots		12	1.2	
Turnout		987	48.7	
Registered electors		2,025		
Conservative hold		Swing	▼8.6	

=== Cubbington ===
Cubbington (2 seats)
Party	Candidate	Votes	%	±%
Conservative	Clifford Cleaver*	1,257	57.2	
Conservative	John Hammon*	1,090	49.6	
Labour	Ian Frost	406	18.5	
Liberal Democrats	Godfrey Carr	392	17.8	
Liberal Democrats	Janice Butler	377	17.2	
Labour	Roger Beckett	375	17.1	
Green	Colin Spink	125	5.7	New
Total valid votes		2,197	99.9	
Rejected ballots		2	0.1	
Turnout		2,199	49.8	
Registered electors		4,412		
Conservative hold				
Conservative hold				

=== Kenilworth Abbey ===
Kenilworth Abbey (3 seats)
Party	Candidate	Votes	%	±%
Liberal Democrats	Jack Bastock	1,985	54.5	
Liberal Democrats	Haydn Thomas	1,581	43.4	
Conservative	Michael Coker*	1,444	39.6	
Liberal Democrats	Patrick Ryan	1,404	38.6	
Conservative	Kenneth Rawnsley*	1,321	36.3	
Conservative	John Cooke*	1,225	33.6	
Labour	John Bennett	428	11.8	
Labour	Geoffrey Cleave	394	10.8	
Labour	Muriel Johnston	392	10.8	
Green	Nicholas D'Ambrumenil	310	8.5	New
Independent	Paul Lewis	135	3.7	New
Total valid votes		3,642	99.4	
Rejected ballots		23	0.6	
Turnout		3,665	58.4	
Registered electors		6,273		
Liberal Democrats gain from Conservative				
Liberal Democrats gain from Conservative				
Conservative hold				

=== Kenilworth Park Hill ===
Kenilworth Park Hill (2 seats)
Party	Candidate	Votes	%	±%
Conservative	Thomas Dalton*	818	44.7	
Conservative	Spencer Harrison*	812	44.3	
Liberal Democrats	Dennis Royston	608	33.2	
Liberal Democrats	Vera Royston	575	31.4	
Labour	Robin Winn	383	20.9	
Labour	Edwin Griffiths	350	19.1	
Green	Philippa Austin	100	5.5	New
Total valid votes		1,831	99.9	
Rejected ballots		2	0.1	
Turnout		1,833	50.6	
Registered electors		3,620		
Conservative hold				
Conservative hold				

=== Kenilworth St. John's ===
Kenilworth St. John's (3 seats)
Party	Candidate	Votes	%	±%
Conservative	Pauline Edwards	2,143	55.7	
Conservative	Robert Wooller*	1,992	51.8	
Conservative	Leslie Windybank	1,980	51.5	
Liberal Democrats	Barbara Ward	1,009	26.2	
Liberal Democrats	Grace Gunter	991	25.8	
Labour	David Peggs	809	21.0	
Labour	Helen Ruffles	786	20.4	
Labour	Thomas Swallow	776	20.2	
Green	Robert Langlands	452	11.7	New
Total valid votes		3,847	99.7	
Rejected ballots		10	0.3	
Turnout		3,857	53.1	
Registered electors		7,261		
Conservative hold				
Conservative hold				
Conservative hold				

=== Lapworth ===
Lapworth (1 seat)
Party	Candidate	Votes	%	±%
Conservative	Leslie Caborn	784	81.6	▲4.2
Labour	John Sawyer	177	18.4	▲10.8
Majority		607	63.2	▲0.7
Total valid votes		961	99.4	
Rejected ballots		6	0.6	
Turnout		967	41.3	
Registered electors		2,339		
Conservative hold		Swing	▼3.3	

=== Leamington Brunswick ===
Leamington Brunswick (3 seats)
Party	Candidate	Votes	%	±%
Labour	Joyce Evans	1,681	63.5	
Labour	Ian Dove	1,563	59.0	
Labour	Balvinder Gill	1,510	57.0	
Conservative	Margaret Cherry	514	19.4	
Conservative	Mavis Milne	429	16.2	
Conservative	Jonathan Von Albkron	384	14.5	
Independent	Shisham Sahota	314	11.9	New
Green	Robert Pickering	247	9.3	New
Green	Penelope Walker	209	7.9	New
Total valid votes		2,647	99.9	
Rejected ballots		3	0.1	
Turnout		2,650	41.8	
Registered electors		6,344		
Labour hold				
Labour hold				
Labour hold				

=== Leamington Clarendon ===
Leamington Clarendon (3 seats)
Party	Candidate	Votes	%	±%
Labour	Robert Crowther	873	39.0	
Labour	George Darmody	793	35.4	
Conservative	Robert Coombes*	786	35.1	
Labour	Andrew Marshall	780	34.8	
Conservative	Isobel Brown	709	31.7	
Conservative	Sydney Ward*	704	31.4	
Leamington Town Forum	Lyndon Cave-Browne-Cave	255	11.4	New
Liberal Democrats	Deirdre Goran	253	11.3	
Green	Neil Armstrong	252	11.3	
Liberal Democrats	Andrew Patrick	242	10.8	
Liberal Democrats	Helen Winnifrith	221	9.9	
Leamington Town Forum	Christopher Davenport	205	9.2	New
Leamington Town Forum	Jane Milburn	192	8.6	New
Green	Josephine White	130	5.8	New
Total valid votes		2,240	99.8	
Rejected ballots		5	0.2	
Turnout		2,245	50.7	
Registered electors		4,431		
Labour gain from Conservative				
Labour gain from Conservative				
Conservative hold				

=== Leamington Crown ===
Leamington Crown (3 seats)
Party	Candidate	Votes	%	±%
Liberal Democrats	Sarah Boad	1,299	55.0	
Liberal Democrats	Alan Boad*	1,292	54.7	
Liberal Democrats	Clifford Harris*	1,175	49.7	
Labour	Humphrey Griffiths	610	25.8	
Labour	Susan Eades	576	24.4	
Labour	Ronald Howell	549	23.2	
Conservative	Brian Hales	451	19.1	
Conservative	Robert Butler	433	18.3	
Conservative	Norman Sida	357	15.1	
Total valid votes		2,362	99.9	
Rejected ballots		2	0.1	
Turnout		2,364	52.4	
Registered electors		4,509		
Liberal Democrats hold				
Liberal Democrats hold				
Liberal Democrats hold				

=== Leamington Manor ===
Leamington Manor (3 seats)
Party	Candidate	Votes	%	±%
Conservative	Stanley Birch*	1,505	48.1	
Conservative	Teresa Bayliss	1,477	47.2	
Conservative	John Higgins*	1,442	46.0	
Liberal Democrats	David Kohler	881	28.1	
Liberal Democrats	George Begg	871	27.8	
Liberal Democrats	Roger Copping	845	27.0	
Labour	Mary Turner	408	13.0	
Labour	Malcolm Fraser	407	13.0	
Labour	Timothy Naylor	381	12.2	
Green	Janet Alty	365	11.7	New
Green	Christopher Philpott	190	6.1	
Green	Alison Gouedard	174	5.6	New
Leamington Town Forum	Guy Ashworth	138	4.4	New
Total valid votes		3,132	99.8	
Rejected ballots		5	0.2	
Turnout		3,137	51.5	
Registered electors		6,094		
Conservative hold				
Conservative hold				
Conservative hold				

=== Leamington Milverton ===
Leamington Milverton (3 seats)
Party	Candidate	Votes	%	±%
Liberal Democrats	Margaret Begg*	1,747	54.1	
Liberal Democrats	Christopher Davis	1,594	49.4	
Liberal Democrats	Michael Gogan	1,487	46.1	
Conservative	Sarah Martin	1,031	31.9	
Conservative	James Halsall	989	30.6	
Conservative	Greville Warwick	949	29.4	
Labour	Susan Byrd	515	15.9	
Labour	Denys Kendall	357	11.1	
Labour	Parmauir Singha	326	10.1	
Green	Julia Sokota	226	7.0	New
Total valid votes		3,229	99.9	
Rejected ballots		3	0.1	
Turnout		3,232	54.0	
Registered electors		5,980		
Liberal Democrats hold				
Liberal Democrats hold				
Liberal Democrats hold				

=== Leamington Willes ===
Leamington Willes (3 seats)
Party	Candidate	Votes	%	±%
Labour	Peter Byrd*	1,250	41.7	
Conservative	Balraj Dhesi*	1,095	36.5	
Labour	Cheryl Flanagan	1,032	34.4	
Labour	Piara Purewal	1,024	34.1	
Conservative	Edward Doyle*	748	24.9	
Conservative	Edward Curtis	660	22.0	
Leamington Town Forum	Ronald Newby	581	19.4	New
Leamington Town Forum	Katherine Oliver	443	14.8	New
Leamington Town Forum	Thomas Holloway	347	11.6	New
Green	Jane Collings	245	8.2	
Green	Alan Geary	202	6.7	
Total valid votes		3,000	99.9	
Rejected ballots		3	0.1	
Turnout		3,003	52.2	
Registered electors		5,749		
Labour hold				
Conservative hold				
Labour gain from Conservative				

=== Leek Wootton ===
Leek Wootton (1 seat)
Party	Candidate	Votes	%	±%
Conservative	Josephine Compton*	799	77.4	▼4.2
Labour	Ian Henderson	233	22.6	▲4.2
Majority		566	54.8	▼8.3
Total valid votes		1,032	98.6	
Rejected ballots		15	1.4	
Turnout		1,047	49.2	
Registered electors		2,128		
Conservative hold		Swing	▼4.2	

=== Radford Semele ===
Radford Semele (1 seat)
Party	Candidate	Votes	%	±%
Conservative	Michael Doody*	503	55.2	▼1.5
Liberal Democrats	Barry Lomas	208	22.8	▼1.8
Labour	Stanley Sabin	201	22.0	▲3.2
Majority		295	32.3	▲0.3
Total valid votes		912	99.9	
Rejected ballots		1	0.1	
Turnout		913	48.5	
Registered electors		1,884		
Conservative hold		Swing	▲0.2	

=== Stoneleigh ===
Stoneleigh (1 seat)
Party	Candidate	Votes	%	±%
Conservative	William Whitfield	754	65.4	▲14.1
Labour	Frederick Amphlett	399	34.6	▲14.2
Majority		355	30.8	▲7.7
Total valid votes		1,153	97.9	
Rejected ballots		25	2.1	
Turnout		1,178	51.1	
Registered electors		2,304		
Conservative hold		Swing	▼0.1	

=== Warwick North ===
Warwick North (3 seats)
Party	Candidate	Votes	%	±%
Conservative	Alfred Boxley*	1,209	41.1	
Conservative	John Walker	1,129	38.4	
Conservative	Margaret Walker*	1,102	37.5	
Labour	Cynthia Beckett	1,056	35.9	
Labour	Edna Booth	1,038	35.3	
Labour	Alan Wilkinson	907	30.9	
Liberal Democrats	Gladys Presswell	508	17.3	
Liberal Democrats	Ian Hooper	480	16.3	
Liberal Democrats	Geoffrey Harris	478	16.3	
Green	Juliet Nickels	340	11.6	
Total valid votes		2,939	97.9	
Rejected ballots		63	2.1	
Turnout		3,002	44.7	
Registered electors		6,722		
Conservative hold				
Conservative hold				
Conservative hold				

=== Warwick South ===
Warwick South (2 seats)
Party	Candidate	Votes	%	±%
Conservative	Gerald Guest*	1,067	46.7	
Conservative	Leo Howlett*	978	42.8	
Independent	Anne Hodgetts	907	39.7	
Labour	Juliet Gladston	420	18.4	
Labour	Roger Duclaud-Williams	390	17.1	
Green	David Bevan	288	12.6	
Green	Francis Nickels	238	10.4	New
Total valid votes		2,287	98.0	
Rejected ballots		46	2.0	
Turnout		2,333	47.7	
Registered electors		4,890		
Conservative hold				
Conservative hold				

=== Warwick West ===
Warwick West (3 seats)
Party	Candidate	Votes	%	±%
Labour	Agnes Leddy*	1,489	58.9	
Labour	James Savory*	1,342	53.1	
Labour	Robert Attwood	1,250	49.5	
Conservative	Gertrude Holland	893	35.3	
Conservative	Robert Hancock	811	32.1	
Conservative	Prabhjiet Dhillon	715	28.3	
Green	James Alty	469	18.6	
Total valid votes		2,527	98.7	
Rejected ballots		32	1.3	
Turnout		2,559	43.7	
Registered electors		5,852		
Labour hold				
Labour hold				
Labour hold				

=== Whitnash ===
Whitnash (3 seats)
Party	Candidate	Votes	%	±%
RA	Bernard Kirton*	1,916	70.8	
RA	Stanley Moreton	1,546	57.1	
RA	Joseph Short	1,475	54.5	
Conservative	John Hughes	582	21.5	
Labour	William Evans	443	16.4	
Labour	Martin Conyon	394	14.6	
Labour	Kevin Walsh	351	13.0	
Conservative	Lydia Skerrey	346	12.8	
Conservative	Malcolm Feather	342	12.6	
Green	Andrew Brown	172	6.4	New
Total valid votes		2,706	99.7	
Rejected ballots		7	0.3	
Turnout		2,713	48.3	
Registered electors		5,613		
RA hold				
RA hold				
RA hold				
