= 1976 Warwick District Council election =

1976 UK local government election

The 1976 Warwick District Council election was held on Thursday 6 May 1976 to elect all 58 members of Warwick District Council to a three-year term, the same day as other local elections in the United Kingdom. It was preceded by the 1973 election and followed by the 1979 election. The Conservative Party gained the council out of no overall control. The turnout across the council was 49.2%.

== Results summary ==
1976 Warwick District Council election
Party	Seats	Net gain/loss	Seats %	Votes %	Votes	+/−
Conservative	41	▲15	70.7			
Labour	14	▼11	24.1			
Liberal	3	▼4	5.2			
Ratepayers	0	New	0.0			
Independent	0	Steady	0.0			

== Ward results ==
=== Ashow, Baginton, Bubbenhall and Stoneleigh ===
Ashow, Bagington, Bubenhall and Stoneleigh (1 seat)
Party	Candidate	Votes	%	±%
Conservative	Graham Wakefield	663	54.3	▼45.7
Labour	Zygmunt Layton-Henry	283	23.2	New
Liberal	Michael Dash	274	22.5	New
Majority		380	31.1	N/A
Total valid votes		1,220	99.8	
Rejected ballots		2	0.2	
Turnout		1,222	51.7	N/A
Registered electors		2,363		
Conservative hold		Swing	▼34.4	

=== Baddesley Clinton, Bushwood, Lapworth and Wroxall ===
Baddesley Clinton, Bushwood, Lapworth and Wroxall (1 seat)
Party	Candidate	Votes	%	±%
Conservative	Thomas Kimpton*	652	88.9	▼11.1
Labour	John Cubbin	81	11.1	New
Majority		571	77.9	N/A
Total valid votes		733	99.7	
Rejected ballots		2	0.3	
Turnout		735	48.1	N/A
Registered electors		1,529		
Conservative hold		Swing	▼11.1	

=== Barford, Norton Lindsey, Sherbourne and Wasperton ===
Barford, Norton Lindsey, Sherbourne and Wasperton (1 seat)
Party	Candidate	Votes	%	±%
Conservative	Cecil Wilkins*	654	90.5	▼9.5
Labour	Susan Cubbin	69	9.5	New
Majority		585	80.9	N/A
Total valid votes		723	99.6	
Rejected ballots		3	0.4	
Turnout		726	55.0	N/A
Registered electors		1,319		
Conservative hold		Swing	▼9.5	

=== Beausale, Guy's Cliffe, Haseley, Hatton, Honiley and Leek Wootton ===
Beausale, Guy's Cliffe, Haseley, Hatton, Honiley and Leek Wootton (1 seat)
Party	Candidate	Votes	%	±%
Conservative	Peter Butler*	478	75.3	▼7.9
Liberal	John Haselgrove	112	17.6	New
Labour	Elizabeth Lee	45	7.1	▼9.7
Majority		366	57.6	▼8.8
Total valid votes		635	99.2	
Rejected ballots		4	0.6	
Turnout		640	46.5	
Registered electors		1,377		
Conservative hold		Swing	▼12.8	

=== Bishop's Tachbrook ===
Bishop's Tachbrook (1 seat)
Party	Candidate	Votes	%	±%
Conservative	James Evans*	364	57.4	▼42.6
Liberal	William Hopkins	144	22.7	New
Labour	Dorothy Clewes	126	19.9	New
Majority		220	34.7	N/A
Total valid votes		634	100.0	
Rejected ballots		0	0.0	
Turnout		634	49.8	N/A
Registered electors		1,274		
Conservative hold		Swing	▼32.6	

=== Blackdown, Eathorpe, Hunningham, Offchurch, Old Milverton, Wappenbury and Weston-Under-Wetherley ===
Blackdown, Eathorpe, Hunningham, Offchurch, Old Milverton, Wappenbury and Weston-Under-Wetherley (1 seat)
Party	Candidate	Votes	%	±%
Conservative	John Hammon*	377	83.2	▲5.7
Labour	Richard Condon	76	16.8	New
Majority		301	66.4	▲11.4
Total valid votes		453	99.6	
Rejected ballots		1	0.2	
Turnout		455	50.7	
Registered electors		897		
Conservative hold		Swing	▼5.5	

=== Budbrooke ===
Budbrooke (1 seat)
Party	Candidate	Votes	%	±%
Liberal	John Brown*	421	55.2	▲4.4
Conservative	Russell Lane	264	34.6	▼0.8
Labour	Kenneth Knight	78	10.2	▼3.6
Majority		157	20.6	▲5.2
Total valid votes		763	98.7	
Rejected ballots		10	1.3	
Turnout		773	51.9	
Registered electors		1,490		
Liberal hold		Swing	▲2.6	

=== Cubbington ===
Cubbington (2 seats)
Party	Candidate	Votes	%	±%
Conservative	Desmond Ellis*	1,004	66.7	▼33.3
Conservative	Thomas Nicholson*	970	64.5	▼35.5
Labour	Thomas Marshall	473	31.4	New
Labour	Dorothy Fryer	407	27.0	New
Total valid votes		1,505	99.6	
Rejected ballots		6	0.4	
Turnout		1,511	47.2	
Registered electors		3,202		
Conservative hold				
Conservative hold				

=== Kenilworth Abbey and Borrowell ===
Kenilworth Abbey and Borrowell (3 seats)
Party	Candidate	Votes	%	±%
Liberal	Helen Dore*	1,397	53.4	
Liberal	Jack Bastock*	1,226	46.8	
Conservative	Kenneth Hogarth	1,224	46.8	
Conservative	Richard Oldnall	1,002	38.3	
Conservative	Patricia Adams	942	36.0	
Liberal	Haydn Thomas*	918	35.1	
Labour	Joseph England	277	10.6	
Labour	Roger Smith	260	9.9	
Labour	Susan O'Donovan	199	7.6	
Total valid votes		2,618	100.0	
Rejected ballots		0	0.0	
Turnout		2,618	60.1	
Registered electors		4,358		
Liberal hold				
Liberal hold				
Conservative gain from Liberal				

=== Kenilworth Castle ===
Kenilworth Castle (2 seats)
Party	Candidate	Votes	%	±%
Conservative	Kenneth Rawnsley*	1,057	65.8	
Conservative	Michael Coker	977	60.8	
Liberal	John Drew	502	31.3	
Liberal	John Riordan	443	27.6	
Labour	Rosemary Ellis	93	5.8	
Labour	Jane Litterick	89	5.5	
Total valid votes		1,606	99.0	
Rejected ballots		16	1.0	
Turnout		1,622	59.3	
Registered electors		2,737		
Conservative hold				
Conservative hold				

=== Kenilworth Park Hill ===
Kenilworth Park Hill (2 seats)
Party	Candidate	Votes	%	±%
Conservative	Henry Potts	862	55.4	
Conservative	Ann Pearce	774	49.7	
Liberal	Robert Butler*	648	41.6	
Liberal	George Bramwell*	596	38.3	
Labour	Malcolm Burfitt	109	7.0	
Labour	Peter Jones	104	6.7	
Total valid votes		1,556	98.7	
Rejected ballots		20	1.3	
Turnout		1,576	64.5	
Registered electors		2,443		
Conservative gain from Liberal				
Conservative gain from Liberal				

=== Kenilworth St. John's ===
Kenilworth St. John's (2 seats)
Party	Candidate	Votes	%	±%
Conservative	Richard Monnington	561	39.3	
Labour	William Wozencroft*	557	39.0	
Conservative	Jerry Hicks	551	38.6	
Labour	Kevin O'Donovan	435	30.5	
Liberal	Kenneth Evans	353	24.7	
Liberal	John Ord	309	21.6	
Total valid votes		1,428	97.7	
Rejected ballots		34	2.3	
Turnout		1,462	64.2	
Registered electors		2,276		
Conservative gain from Labour				
Labour hold				

=== Kenilworth Windy Arbour ===
Kenilworth Windy Arbour (2 seats)
Party	Candidate	Votes	%	±%
Conservative	John Wilson*	1,134	68.8	
Conservative	Thomas Robinson*	1,076	65.3	
Liberal	Derek Ching	482	29.2	
Liberal	Dennis Coulson	391	23.7	
Labour	Peter Singer	79	4.8	
Labour	Graham Hall	75	4.5	
Total valid votes		1,649	99.9	
Rejected ballots		2	0.1	
Turnout		1,651	64.9	
Registered electors		2,544		
Conservative hold				
Conservative hold				

=== Leamington Albany ===
Leamington Albany (3 seats)
Party	Candidate	Votes	%	±%
Conservative	Margaret Bull*	831	52.9	
Conservative	Peter Robins	785	49.9	
Conservative	Christopher Clark	756	48.1	
Liberal	Valerie Davis*	520	33.1	
Liberal	Patricia Turner	364	23.2	
Liberal	Alan Boad	331	21.1	
Labour	Richard Bevan	297	18.9	
Labour	Patrick Burke	292	18.6	
Labour	David Talbot	288	18.3	
Total valid votes		1,572	99.8	
Rejected ballots		3	0.2	
Turnout		1,575	39.6	
Registered electors		3,980		
Conservative hold				
Conservative hold				
Conservative gain from Liberal				

=== Leamington Aylesford ===
Leamington Aylesford (3 seats)
Party	Candidate	Votes	%	±%
Labour	Jopseph Reardon*	1,148	55.1	
Labour	Ian Frost*	1,123	53.9	
Labour	Brian Weekes	1,045	50.2	
Conservative	Roger Elson	628	30.2	
Conservative	Dennis Flanagan	589	28.3	
Conservative	David Pain	558	26.8	
Liberal	Alan Geary	252	12.1	New
Liberal	Clifford Harris	212	10.2	New
Liberal	Anthony McGurdy	178	8.5	New
Total valid votes		2,082	100.0	
Rejected ballots		0	0.0	
Turnout		2,082	46.7	
Registered electors		4,458		
Labour hold				
Labour hold				
Labour hold				

=== Leamington Beverley ===
Leamington Beverley (2 seats)
Party	Candidate	Votes	%	±%
Conservative	Marshall Kerry*	998	61.8	
Conservative	John Higgins	973	60.2	
Liberal	Leonard Fleming	419	25.9	New
Liberal	Peter Wales	410	25.4	New
Labour	Peter Byrd	150	9.3	
Labour	Arthur Frost	145	9.0	
Total valid votes		1,615	99.8	
Rejected ballots		4	0.2	
Turnout		1,619	50.4	
Registered electors		3,211		
Conservative hold				
Conservative hold				

=== Leamington Campion ===
Leamington Campion (3 seats)
Party	Candidate	Votes	%	±%
Conservative	Robert Coombes*	953	58.4	
Conservative	Norman Parker*	936	57.3	
Conservative	Thomas Williams*	924	56.6	
Labour	Malcolm Higley	366	22.4	
Labour	Geoffrey Renshaw	362	22.2	
Labour	Geoffrey Turner	355	21.7	
Liberal	June Slatter	223	13.7	
Liberal	Roger Copping	219	13.4	
Liberal	David Moore	210	12.9	New
Total valid votes		1,633	99.9	
Rejected ballots		2	0.1	
Turnout		1,635	40.0	
Registered electors		4,085		
Conservative hold				
Conservative hold				
Conservative hold				

=== Leamington Crown ===
Leamington Crown (3 seats)
Party	Candidate	Votes	%	±%
Labour	Humphrey Griffiths	896	50.9	
Labour	Norman Griffiths*	879	49.9	
Labour	Barbara Kiybet*	866	49.2	
Conservative	Peter Draper	789	44.8	
Conservative	Brian Willis	764	43.4	
Conservative	Glen Evans	761	43.2	
Total valid votes		1,761	99.9	
Rejected ballots		2	0.1	
Turnout		1,763	41.2	
Registered electors		4,278		
Labour hold				
Labour hold				
Labour hold				

=== Leamington Kingsway ===
Leamington Kingsway (4 seats)
Party	Candidate	Votes	%	±%
Labour	Walter Fowler*	862	52.9	
Labour	Peter Tombs*	847	52.0	
Labour	Patricia Robinson	828	50.8	
Labour	June Sharp	816	50.1	
Conservative	Josephine Doyle	639	39.2	
Conservative	Louise Hinton	577	35.4	
Conservative	Geoffrey Crowe	566	34.7	
Conservative	Robert Johnston	565	34.7	
Total valid votes		1,629	100.0	
Rejected ballots		0	0.0	
Turnout		1,629	36.8	
Registered electors		4,425		
Labour hold				
Labour hold				
Labour hold				
Labour hold				

=== Leamington Manor ===
Leamington Manor (3 seats)
Party	Candidate	Votes	%	±%
Conservative	Stanley Birch*	1,212	65.1	
Conservative	Peter Barton*	1,141	61.2	
Conservative	Gordon Swain*	1,067	57.3	
Ratepayers	John Hart	829	44.5	New
Labour	Hannah Griffiths	309	16.6	
Labour	Robert Fryer	285	15.3	
Labour	Kathleen Long	246	13.2	
Total valid votes		1,863	99.8	
Rejected ballots		3	0.2	
Turnout		1,866	52.9	
Registered electors		3,528		
Conservative hold				
Conservative hold				
Conservative hold				

=== Leamington Willes ===
Leamington Willes (3 seats)
Party	Candidate	Votes	%	±%
Conservative	Edward Doyle	1,051	55.0	
Conservative	Roy Charles	997	52.1	
Conservative	Sydney Ward	899	47.0	
Labour	Henry Kamen*	727	38.0	
Labour	Michael Stockton*	687	35.9	
Labour	Michael Hurley	685	35.8	
Independent	Winifred Brockbank	236	12.3	New
Total valid votes		1,912	100.0	
Rejected ballots		0	0.0	
Turnout		1,912	47.5	
Registered electors		4,029		
Conservative gain from Labour				
Conservative gain from Labour				
Conservative gain from Labour				

=== Radford Semele ===
Radford Semele (1 seat)
Party	Candidate	Votes	%	±%
Conservative	James Critchley*	493	75.3	▲23.4
Labour	Susan Byrd	162	24.7	▼1.2
Majority		331	50.5	▲24.6
Total valid votes		655	100.0	
Rejected ballots		0	0.0	
Turnout		655	46.7	
Registered electors		1,404		
Conservative hold		Swing	▲12.3	

=== Rowington and Shrewley ===
Rowington and Shrewley (1 seat)
Party	Candidate	Votes	%	±%
Conservative	John Jarrett	560	87.5	▼12.5
Labour	David Deaton	41	6.4	New
Liberal	William Payne-Jeremiah	39	6.1	New
Majority		519	81.1	N/A
Total valid votes		640	99.8	
Rejected ballots		1	0.2	
Turnout		641	50.3	N/A
Registered electors		1,274		
Conservative hold		Swing	▼9.5	

=== Warwick Central ===
Warwick Central (2 seats)
Party	Candidate	Votes	%	±%
Conservative	Bryn Brewster	804	54.1	
Conservative	John Morley	800	53.9	
Labour	Ian Briggs	630	42.4	
Labour	Brian Thomas	626	42.2	
Total valid votes		1,485	98.6	
Rejected ballots		21	1.4	
Turnout		1,506	50.7	
Registered electors		2,970		
Conservative hold				
Conservative gain from Labour				

=== Warwick East ===
Warwick East (4 seats)
Party	Candidate	Votes	%	±%
Conservative	Walter Butler	1,388	47.1	
Conservative	Gerald Guest	1,367	46.4	
Conservative	Leo Howlett*	1,365	46.3	
Conservative	George Wilson	1,258	42.7	
Labour	Bertie Charlett*	1,133	38.4	
Labour	Bridget Savory	1,131	38.4	
Labour	Leslie Kent*	1,054	35.8	
Labour	Edward Green	1,039	35.3	
Liberal	Alan Bevan	402	13.6	
Liberal	Mary Harrison	377	12.8	
Liberal	Henry Tew	354	12.0	New
Liberal	Jack Watkins	350	11.9	New
Total valid votes		2,947	98.2	
Rejected ballots		53	1.8	
Turnout		3,000	45.4	
Registered electors		6,611		
Conservative gain from Labour				
Conservative gain from Labour				
Conservative hold				
Conservative gain from Labour				

=== Warwick West ===
Warwick West (3 seats)
Party	Candidate	Votes	%	±%
Conservative	Cherrie Chandley	972	51.8	
Conservative	Arthur Coleman	950	50.6	
Labour	Agnes Leddy*	914	48.7	
Conservative	Adrian Coller	872	46.5	
Labour	James Savory*	831	44.3	
Labour	James McGrouther*	794	42.3	
Total valid votes		1,877	99.0	
Rejected ballots		19	1.0	
Turnout		1,896	48.8	
Registered electors		3,882		
Conservative gain from Labour				
Conservative gain from Labour				
Labour hold				

=== Whitnash ===
Whitnash (3 seats)
Party	Candidate	Votes	%	±%
Labour	Bernard Kirton*	1,308	57.5	
Conservative	David Mann	1,083	47.6	
Labour	Thomas Smith*	1,077	47.3	
Conservative	Johan Gerrard	1,032	45.3	
Conservative	Gordon North	960	42.2	
Labour	Gerald Conyngham	900	39.5	
Total valid votes		2,276	99.3	
Rejected ballots		17	0.7	
Turnout		2,293	49.2	
Registered electors		4,661		
Labour hold				
Conservative gain from Labour				
Labour hold				
