= Highpoint Prison =

Highpoint Prison may refer to two prisons located in Stradishall, Suffolk, England:

- HM Prison Highpoint North, a Category C men's prison (previously known as Edmunds Hill Prison)
- HM Prison Highpoint South, another Category C men's prison
