= RAF Stradishall =

Former Royal Air Force station in Suffolk, England

RAF Stradishall
- Stradishall, Suffolk in England
- Latin: Vires de caelo ("Might from the sky")

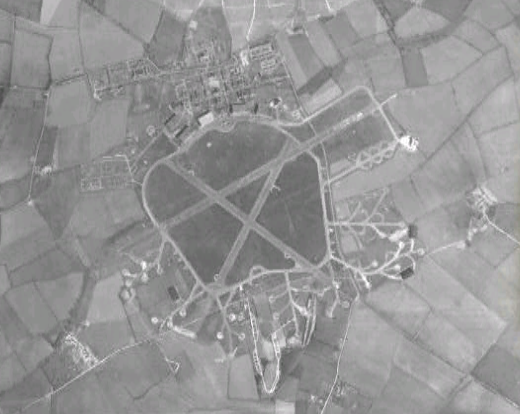
- Aerial view in 1945

Site information
- Type: Royal Air Force station
- Owner: Ministry of Defence
- Operator: Royal Air Force
- Controlled by: RAF Bomber Command 1938-49 * No. 3 Group RAF; RAF Fighter Command 1949-61 * No. 12 Group RAF; RAF Flying Training Command 1961-70

Location
- Shown within Suffolk RAF Stradishall (the United Kingdom)
- Coordinates: 52°08′06″N 000°30′51″E
- Grid reference: TL720515

Site history
- Built: 1937
- In use: February 1938 - 1970
- Battles/wars: European theatre of World War II

Airfield information
- Elevation: 116 metres (381 ft) AMSL
Runways
Direction	Length and surface
02/20	Concrete
06/24	Concrete
12/30	Concrete

Royal Air Force Stradishall or more simply RAF Stradishall is a former Royal Air Force station located 7 miles (11 km) north east of Haverhill, Suffolk and 9 miles (14 km) south west of Bury St Edmunds, Suffolk, England.

== History ==
In his memoirs, Murray Peden, a Royal Canadian Air Force pilot, recounts his training at Stradishall. In the RAF's "heavy conversion unit" (No. 1657 Heavy Conversion Unit) at the airfield, he and others were trained to fly Short Stirling bombers. He describes in detail his experiences flying there, and the life on the ground of aircrew who were shortly to begin operations over Nazi Germany as part of RAF Bomber Command during the Second World War.

The airfield was home to a number of squadrons during its lifetime:

- No. 1 Squadron RAF
- No. 9 Squadron RAF
- No. 35 (Madras Presidency) Squadron RAF
- No. 51 Squadron RAF
- No. 54 Squadron RAF
- No. 75 (New Zealand) Squadron RAF
- No. 85 Squadron RAF
- No. 89 Squadron RAF
- No. 101 Squadron RAF
- No. 109 Squadron RAF
- No. 115 Squadron RAF
- No. 125 (Newfoundland) Squadron RAF
- No. 138 Squadron RAF
- No. 148 Squadron RAF
- No. 149 (East India) Squadron RAF
- No. 150 Squadron RAF
- No. 152 (Hyderabad) Squadron RAF
- No. 158 Squadron RAF
- No. 186 Squadron RAF
- No. 207 Squadron RAF
- No. 208 Squadron RAF
- No. 214 (Federated Malay States) Squadron RAF
- No. 215 Squadron RAF
- No. 236 Squadron RAF
- No. 245 (Northern Rhodesian) Squadron RAF
- No. 254 Squadron RAF
- No. 263 (Fellowship of the Bellows) Squadron RAF
- No. 311 (Czechoslovak) Squadron RAF

The following units were also here at some point:

- No. 1 Air Navigation School RAF
- No. 3 Group Training Flight RAF
- No. 7 Conversion Flight RAF
- No. 21 Blind Approach Training Flight RAF
- No. 23 Operational Training Unit RAF
- No. 26 Heavy Glider Maintenance Section RAF
- No. 31 Base RAF
- No. 149 Conversion Flight RAF
- No. 203 Advanced Flying School RAF
- No. 214 Conversion Flight RAF
- No. 218 Conversion Flight RAF
- No. 226 Operational Conversion Unit RAF
- No. 419 (Special Duties) Flight RAF
- No. 1419 (Special Duties) Flight RAF
- No. 1427 (Ferry Training) Flight RAF
- No. 1474 (Special Duties) Flight RAF
- No. 1521 (Beam Approach Training) Flight RAF
- No. 2 Section, No. 1552 (Radio Aids Training) Flight RAF
- No. 1556 (Radio Aids Training) Flight RAF
- No. 1657 Heavy Conversion Unit RAF
- No. 2725 Squadron RAF Regiment
- No. 2754 Squadron RAF Regiment
- New Zealand Flight RAF
- Photographic Development Unit RAF

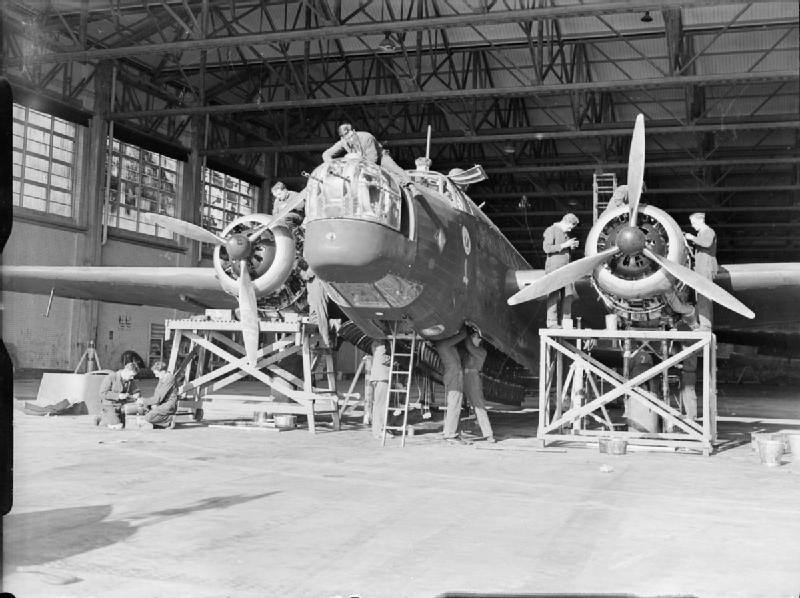
214 Squadron Wellington being repaired and overhauled at RAF Stradishall

== Current use ==
The airfield closed in 1970 and is now the site of two category C prisons: HMP Highpoint North and HMP Highpoint South. Part of the former airfield remains a Ministry of Defence training site which is not accessible to the public.

The airfield has been sold to a private buyer to be converted into farm land.

The Airfield is a Solar Farm with grazing for cattle and nature walk. It is open from dawn to dusk.

There is a memorial to RAF Stradishall outside Stirling House which was once part of the officers quarters and is now a training unit for the Prison service.
