= Edward Davenport (born 1966) =

English socialite, property developer and fraudster (born 1966)

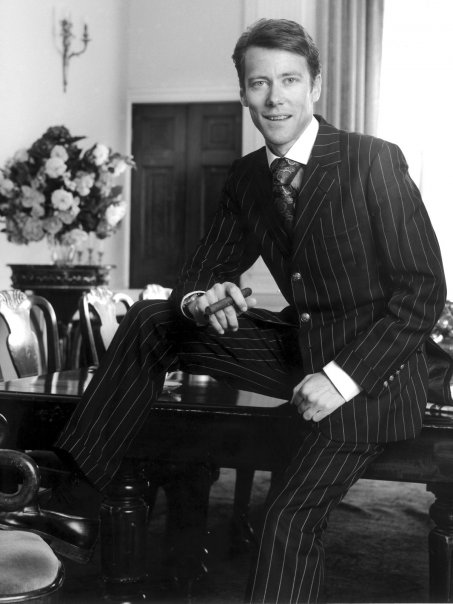
- Davenport in 2007
- Born: Edward Ormus Sharrington Davenport; 11 July 1966 (age 60); Kensington, London, England
- Occupation: Businessman
- Years active: 1982–present
- Known for: Serious fraud; founder of the Gatecrasher Balls; property developer
- Website: davenporttrust.com

Edward Ormus Sharrington Davenport (born 11 July 1966) is a convicted English fraudster, socialite, and property developer.

The self-styled "Lord", nicknamed "Fast Eddie", came to prominence in the late 1980s as the organiser of the controversial Gatecrasher Balls for wealthy teenagers. After being convicted for tax offences in 1990, he began a second career as a property developer. He claimed to have acquired a substantial fortune, but also attracted controversy for his business practices such as the way he acquired the former High Commission building of Sierra Leone in London, during the country's civil war.

From 2005 to 2009 he was the "ringmaster" of a series of advance-fee fraud schemes that defrauded dozens of individuals out of millions of pounds. He was arrested and charged in December 2009 and was convicted in September 2011 along with five other defendants, receiving a jail sentence of seven years and eight months.

== Early life ==
Davenport was born in Kensington, London, to Dublin-born Ormus Neville Talbot Davenport, a Magdalen College, Oxford-educated director and general manager of pharmaceutical products company Benefax, and his second wife, Jean (née Gorrie). His father's first wife was Elizabeth Aurora, daughter of the soldier Sir Hugh Tudor. The Davenport family claimed descent from 'Ormus de Davenport', alleged to have lived at the time of the Norman Conquest; mainly vicars and soldiers, they were subsequently listed in Burke's Landed Gentry.

== Gatecrasher Balls ==
At age 15, Davenport began selling clothes on Portobello Road. While still a teenage boarder at Frensham Heights school, he started organising parties, first at his home and then in nightclubs.. In September 1986, aged 20, Davenport co-founded Gatecrasher Ltd with Jeremy Taylor. The company organised parties for teenagers at country houses such as Longleat and Weston Park, which were attended by up to 10,000 party-goers at any one time and at the height of their success were generating £1,000,000 a year. The idea behind the balls was to enable wealthy teenagers at single-sex boarding schools to meet the opposite sex and drink large amounts of alcohol. As one reveller put it, "I'm here to get drunk and get laid". The balls gained a reputation for debauchery, with one newspaper calling them the scene of "Unbridled lust among upper-class Lolitas and public school Lotharios."

The balls ceased to be held after an HM Customs & Excise audit found that Davenport had substantially underpaid his Value Added Tax bill. Davenport was found to have understated his tax returns by £24,672 by falsely claiming that only £3.50 of the £14 entry fees for the Gatecrasher Balls was liable for VAT; the remaining £10.50 was supposedly for raffle tickets, a magazine subscription and postage. The prosecution described this as a "cheat" and Davenport admitted breaching VAT rules. Convicted for tax evasion, he was sentenced in November 1990 to nine months in jail. Asked by Tatler magazine how he coped with two weeks in prison, Davenport said in 2006: "Boring. There aren't many parties there." The sentence was reduced on appeal to a nine-month suspended term for tax fraud. He later attributed his legal problems to his being "incredibly naive about things like VAT."

== Business ==
In 1991, Davenport turned his attention to the club sector. His ventures included joint ownership. with Piers Adam, of the SW1 Club (now known as Pacha), and The Conservatory in Derby. After selling the clubs, he established a high-end pawnbroking business with offices in Bruton Street, Mayfair, to pawn expensive jewellery and luxury cars. After acquiring the manorial title of the village of Gifford in Shropshire, he began to call himself "Lord Edward", though he is not a member of the peerage. He claimed to own 25 buildings in the West End of London worth an estimated £100 million, controlled through a Monaco-based company called the Davenport Trust, as well as property in Monaco and Thailand.

According to Davenport, his business method is "buying leases on loss-making properties, returning them to a profit and then selling them." A BBC investigation reported that tenants would pay their rent to one of Davenport's temporary companies, which would then pay the owner of the building. He was accused by the BBC of increasing tenants' rents at short notice and evicting them if they did not agree to the new terms, but he denied the claims, calling them "very far-fetched." In 2006, his home was raided by police and Department of Trade and Industry investigators looking into his links with two property companies that collapsed owing millions of pounds. He avoided legal action on that occasion, although action was taken against an audit firm.

In 1998, Davenport and two other men were charged after running up an £18,000 bill at the luxury Gleneagles Hotel in Scotland during a five-day New Year party. The three were said to have posed as aristocrats. They denied the charges, which were later dropped, but Davenport failed to turn up in court and claimed that he had suffered kidney failure and could not travel because he was receiving dialysis.

=== 33 Portland Place ===
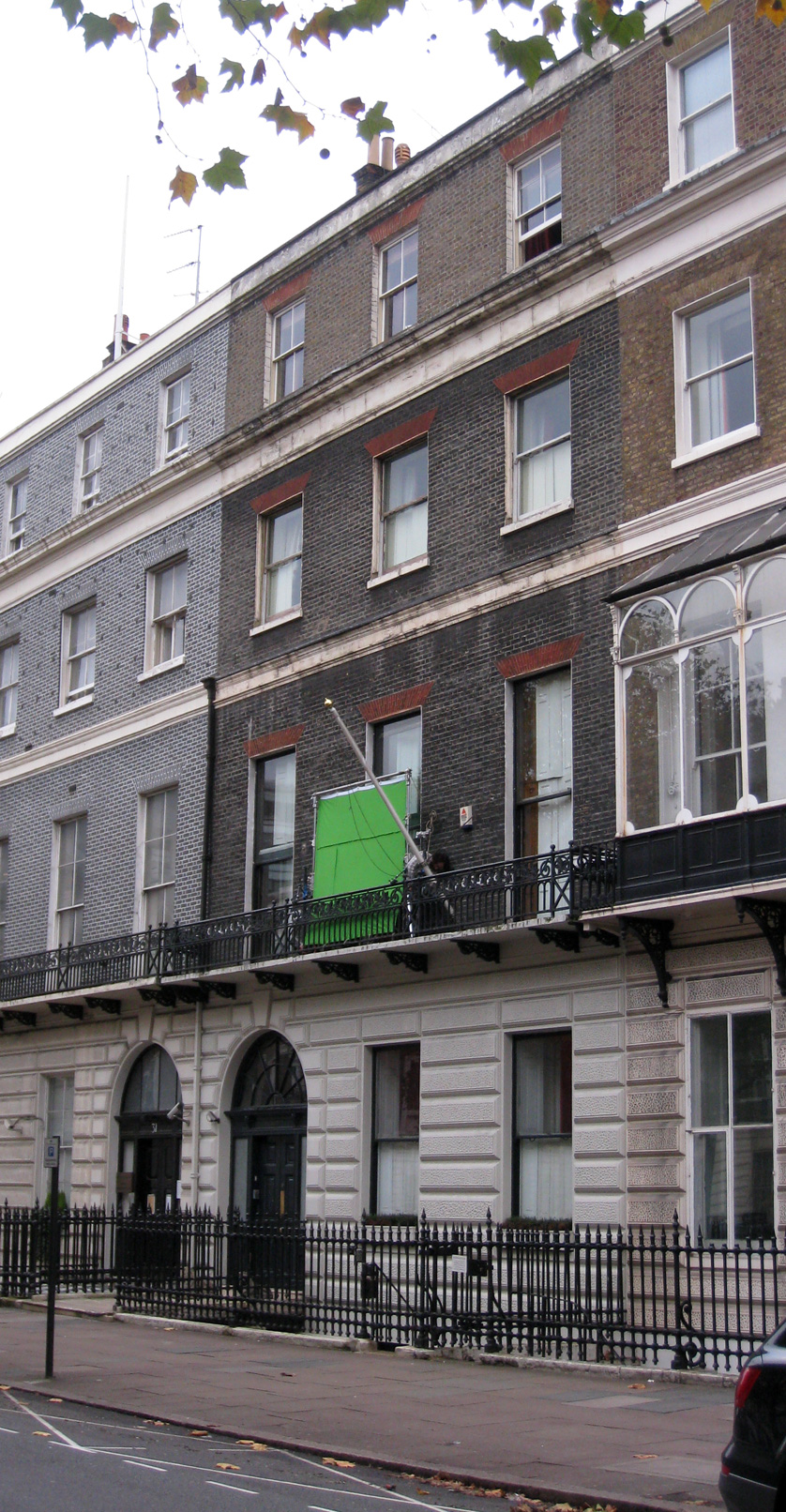
33 Portland Place

33 Portland Place is a Marylebone mansion built in the 1770s, and designed by architect Robert Adam. It served as the London embassy of Sierra Leone from 1954 to 1998.

In 1996, Davenport was introduced to Professor Cyril Foray, the former Foreign Minister and High Commissioner of Sierra Leone, during that country's civil war. Davenport entered into negotiations with the Sierra Leone government in order to refurbish the London embassy, then valued at £5 million. He acquired a lease on the building for £50,000 but eventually claimed the property as his private residence. The government of Sierra Leone took legal action against Davenport in London in 1999, but the case was eventually settled with no clear victor. The British government offered to purchase a new building for the Sierra Leonean High Commission, leaving Davenport with the remainder of the lease. In 2005 a Nevis-based company, Portland Place (Historic House) Ltd, acquired the freehold of the building for £3.75 million. A UK company, with an identical name, Portland Place (Historic House) Ltd, is registered at 33 Portland Place with assets and turnover listed as nil.

The property was regularly hired out for tango and pole-dancing lessons and parties, leading to many complaints from neighbours. In 2005, the Sunday Mirror reported that orgies were being held at Davenport's mansion. In July 2006 Westminster City Council issued an enforcement order directing Davenport to cease using the property for "commercial and non-residential purposes" but this was essentially ignored and unauthorised use continued.

Davenport has also hired out the building for high-profile events, including exhibitions, films and photography shoots for figures such as Kate Moss, Johnny Depp and Helena Bonham Carter. All Visual Arts used it for a Frieze Art Fair exhibition titled Vanitas: The Transience of Earthly Pleasures in 2010 and singer Amy Winehouse used it to shoot the video for her hit song Rehab. In April 2010, the house doubled as Lionel Logue's clinic in Oscar-winning film The King's Speech starring Colin Firth. A number of porn films were also reportedly shot there.

In July 2010, following a party at 33 Portland Place, Westminster City Council brought a legal action against Davenport charging him with breaching a noise abatement order. The case was dismissed by Judge Purdy at Westminster City Magistrates Court, and Davenport was awarded £28,000 in costs. Later that month Westminster City Council brought an action at the High Court charging that Davenport's use of the property breached planning permission. The council reported that Davenport had filled a small pool with 1,000 litres of cognac. Davenport was found to have breached the 2006 enforcement notice and a High Court judge issued a permanent ban on the use of the house for non-residential purposes. In April 2011 Davenport lost an appeal against the injunction.

=== Patrick Cox ===
In 2008, Davenport purchased the fashion label of celebrity shoe designer Patrick Cox for £2.6 million. Following the sale of his business, Cox remained on the board. However, Cox was later forced to close his store and make his staff redundant when the deal broke down in acrimonious circumstances. According to another board member, Robert Lee, the £2.6 million promised by Davenport never turned up and his representative Peter Riley did not attend a single board meeting. Lee alleged that Davenport had tried to make licensing deals abroad using the Patrick Cox name without the board's approval or the right to do so, and had removed assets from Cox's studio in Chelsea. Davenport denied the allegations, saying that "everything he does is within the legal framework."

=== 32 Portland Place ===
Davenport also owns 32 Portland Place, which was the venue where pornographic actress Bonnie Blue, in a well-publicised manner much discussed in the press, purportedly slept with 1,000 men in 12 hours. At 7 A.M. on Sunday, 23 February 2025, three men were arrested there following the stabbing of three men during a fight at a 'sex party'. Four men were taken to hospital, their injuries "not believed to be life-threatening" per the Metropolitan Police.

== Advance fee fraud ==
In late 1990 Davenport acquired an existing shelf company and renamed it as Gresham Ltd – a name similar to, but wholly unconnected with, the well-known wealth management company Gresham Financial – which he used as a vehicle for fee frauds. Gresham was falsely presented as a long-established, wealthy and prestigious firm with a prospectus claiming that it had been involved in the commercial loans market since 1958. The company promoted itself through glossy brochures and advertisements in the Financial Times.

Between 2005 and 2009, Davenport and several co-conspirators promised to finance over 50 commercial loans, targeting construction projects in several countries. Businesses were asked to pay large sums for "deposits", "verification fees", "loan guarantees" and "due diligence". The company's records noted payments of £4.5 million from prospective borrowers. Ten of the largest prospects were promised loans of £500 million but, like the rest, received nothing. In one case reported by the Financial Times, a fee of €830,000 was charged as a "security deposit". The value of the fraud was said by prosecutors to be at least £12 million. Victims included Elizabeth Emanuel, who lost her savings after being promised a £1 million loan. An Indian businessman paid £285,000 to finance a €183 million loan but suffered "crippling losses" of £825,000 after no money arrived, leaving him owing €11 million.

In October 2009 Gresham was liquidated after companies secretly controlled by Davenport petitioned to have it wound up. He continued the advance fee fraud through another newly acquired shelf company, Cutting and Company (Investments) Ltd, which had been established in 1930 and had been dormant since about 2000. Cutting was portrayed to the public as a restructuring expert. Davenport sought to keep his distance from the fraud by using aliases such as "James Stewart" or "James Stuart". However, he was exposed when fire regulators recognised "James Stewart" as Davenport from photographs on his own website and informed the Serious Fraud Office (SFO).

Two months later, at the start of December 2009, SFO investigators and police raided 19 commercial and residential properties in London, Surrey, Cheshire and Derbyshire and arrested six people. Davenport was charged with conspiracy to obtain money by deception, conspiracy to commit fraud by false representation and money laundering. He was also accused of carrying out a "price ramping" fraud on a £2.4 million property in central London to artificially increase its price at auction. The property, an office building at 80 Paul Street in the City of London, was said to have been sold for £700,000 more than its market value due to a false claim made about a lease supposedly guaranteed by Gresham Ltd. The SFO also said that it was investigating allegations of a rent fraud involving Gresham.

Also accused were David McHugh, an accountant; David Horsfall, Davenport's solicitor, Peter Riley, a Gresham director; Richard Kirkup (also known as Richard Stephens), who had been convicted in 2004 of a previous advance fee fraud; and Borge Andersen, Davenport and Riley were remanded in custody to Wandsworth Prison while the others were released either on bail or without charges.

=== Trial and conviction ===
In June 2011, the SFO brought 11 cases against Davenport in Southwark Crown Court, though prosecutors said that these represented only a fraction of the true scale of the fraud, as there were at least 51 victims in the UK, Austria and India. Davenport was also charged with a separate £8 million fraud and money laundering scam. The three-month trial concluded in September 2011 with Davenport, Riley and Andersen each convicted on a single count of fraud. The other charges against Davenport were left to lie on file. Horsfall, McHugh and Kirkup pleaded guilty.

Davenport was found to be the "ringmaster and guiding mind" behind the fraud, while Riley was described as "an accomplished conman" and a skilful liar who "strung along borrowers on a huge scale with bare-faced lies". Both men were sentenced to seven years and eight months' imprisonment, banned from becoming company directors for 10 years and ordered to pay compensation and legal costs. Andersen, who was described as being "generally perceived as the most articulate and plausible of the fraudsters", was sentenced to 39 months. On 11 November 2011, Horsfall was sentenced to 17 months for fraud by false representation, while McHugh and Kirkup received four years and two months and three years and eight months respectively for conspiracy to defraud. McHugh was revealed to have been convicted of 40 offences since 2000. He had falsely claimed to be a lawyer and accountant and also produced false company accounts for Gresham, while Kirkup posed as a surveyor to carry out expensive assessment visits to the sites of planned building projects. Horsfall admitted writing a letter that falsified how much money Gresham had.

Reporting restrictions were imposed at the start of the trial but were lifted in October 2011 after Horsfall, the final defendant, pleaded guilty. According to Gresham's accounts, Andersen received £159,564, Riley £695,407, and Davenport £773,000, but a further £349,025 went missing and could not be traced. However, SFO investigators are reported to have found that Davenport has few assets in his name and went to great lengths to distance himself from the fraud; Judge Testar commented, "He did not leave very many footprints in the snow himself."

In November Karen Todner challenged the decision of Judge Testar to impose a Compensation Order of £1.9m, in addition to the £12m Confiscation Order already imposed on Davenport. The Court of Appeal accepted those representations and Davenport's Confiscation Order was reduced by £1.9m. Both orders were settled and the Court Service returned Davenport's money forthwith. Davenport was subsequently released from prison on compassionate grounds, due to serious illness.

=== Reactions ===
Sentencing Davenport, Riley and Andersen, Judge Peter Testar said: "This was a professional, sophisticated fraud which had a grave impact on its victims, decent honest people." He commented: "The stress and anxiety these people suffered were enormous and their lives have been grievously affected by this fraud. Some of them will never recover from that ... It was a professional and sophisticated fraud which had a great impact on the victims and each of these two defendants [Davenport and Riley] had a significant role to play." Judge David Higgins, who sentenced the remaining defendants, said: "Not one penny was ever produced by the conspirators, who simply put the fees etc in their pockets. The harm done to the victims was substantial, including bankruptcy, unemployment and at least one personal breakdown." The Director of the Serious Fraud Office, Richard Alderman, hailed the convictions as a major success for the SFO and commented: "This was a proactive investigation that stopped a sophisticated criminal enterprise in its tracks. The time taken from the commencement of the investigation to trial was a little over fifteen months and demonstrates the SFO's commitment to reducing the time taken to bring cases before the Crown Court."

Following his conviction, Davenport issued a statement expressing his "shock and dismay" at the verdict. He said: "This is a matter that I have denied throughout and have already lodged an appeal against this conviction at the Royal Courts of Justice (ref 201103357D3); detailed grounds of appeal have been drafted and filed by my legal team... I will continue to make every effort to prove my innocence and I look forward to my case being considered by the Court of Appeal and being able to clear my name."

Following his release from prison in 2014, Davenport successfully appealed against a Confiscation Order he was forced to pay after being convicted of fraud in 2011. After his release, Davenport reportedly became involved in property deals with a Chinese business partner and started looking to buy a film studio.

=== Confiscation proceedings ===
Confiscation proceedings against Davenport began on 19 June 2013. According to prosecutors, he had made £34.5 million through his fraud schemes, though Davenport has argued that he should only repay £8 million. Alleged largest single element was the purchase of 33 Portland Place building, which the prosecution has said was obtained through fraud.

In October 2015 Davenport returned to the Court of Appeal, claiming he had been the victim of “double counting” by the SFO in its Confiscation and Compensation Order.

The SFO said it had recovered more than £13 million from Davenport to satisfy the orders, but Davenport's solicitor Karen Todner argued that he had already paid too much in confiscation and compensation. Todner told the Court of Appeal that although Davenport might have benefited from £12 million fraud, he had been made to repay nearly £14 million. SFO lawyers disagreed with the sentiment and said Davenport's appeals should be dismissed however Court of Appeal subsequently accepted Todner's appeal lodged on Davenport's behalf and the Order was set aside.
