= Lauri Love =

British Finnish activist and hacker

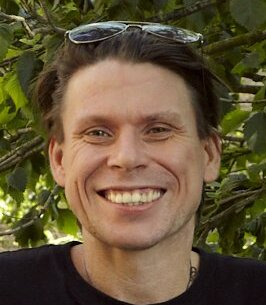
- Love, 2023
- Born: 14 December 1984 (age 41); United Kingdom
- Citizenship: Finland; United Kingdom
- Education: University of Nottingham (did not graduate); University of Glasgow (did not graduate)
- Occupations: Advisor on computer security systems, Hacker House (as of September 2016); Student studying electrical engineering at University of Suffolk (as of September 2016)

Lauri Love (/ˈlaʊri/; born 14 December 1984, United Kingdom) is a British activist who was previously charged by the United States for his alleged activities with the hacker collective Anonymous. Love's case has been cited as precedent in the Julian Assange extradition proceedings.

== Early life and education ==
Love is from Stradishall, Suffolk. His parents, Alexander Love, a prison chaplain at HM Prison Highpoint North, and Sirkka-Liisa Love (a Finnish citizen), who also works at the prison, live in Stradishall. He has dual citizenship of the United Kingdom and Finland.

After dropping out of sixth form college and working in a turkey plant, Love applied for a Finnish passport, and then served in the Finnish Army for six months, became a conscientious objector and finished another six months of his obligation in alternative civilian service.

After that, he applied at the University of Nottingham in England and dropped out in his second term after a physical and mental collapse, then at the University of Glasgow in Scotland, but dropped out in his second year, again for health reasons. He was part of the 2011 Hetherington House Occupation, a student protest at Glasgow University.

== United States indictment ==
In January 2013, the website of the United States Sentencing Commission was replaced with a video protesting the treatment of activist Aaron Swartz who had committed suicide days earlier. The video claimed that those responsible had obtained secrets from the United States Army, Missile Defense Agency, and NASA but they were only ever released in encrypted form. The subsequent investigation named Lauri Love in two indictments (2013 in District of New Jersey, 2014 in Southern District of New York and Eastern District of Virginia) for allegedly "breaching thousands of computer systems in the United States and elsewhere – including the computer networks of federal agencies – to steal massive quantities of confidential data". The United States made an extradition request.

Love's attorney in America was Tor Ekeland.

== National Crime Agency arrest ==
The National Crime Agency (NCA) arrested Love in October 2013. In February 2015, BBC News revealed that Love was taking legal action for the return of computers seized by the NCA when he was arrested.

In May 2016, Judge Nina Tempia of the Westminster Magistrates' Court ruled that Love did not have to tell the NCA what his passwords, or encryption keys, are.

== Extradition hearing ==
During Love's two day extradition hearing on 28 and 29 June 2016 at the Westminster Magistrates' Court in London, his father testified that Lauri Love is autistic and so should not be extradited. Specifically, he testified that his son was not diagnosed autistic until he was an adult serving in the Finnish Army. Psychologist Simon Baron-Cohen, who diagnosed Love as autistic in 2012, testified that Love should not be extradited because of his diagnosed disorders, which also include eczema, psychosis, and depression. Baron-Cohen stated that Love told him that he would commit suicide if extradited.

Love, who lived at home with his parents, testified at his extradition hearing on 29 June 2016. He was supported by the Courage Foundation. Love's barrister for this extradition hearing was Ben Cooper of Doughty Street Chambers. The case was adjourned.

On 16 September 2016, at Westminster Magistrates' Court, a judge ruled that Love could be extradited to the United States. Love's solicitor Karen Todner said that they would appeal, and on 5 February 2018, Lord Chief Justice Lord Burnett and Mr Justice Ouseley, at the High Court, upheld his appeal against extradition because his extradition would be "oppressive by reason of his physical and mental condition".

== Popular culture ==
In January 2018, it was announced that novelist Frederick Forsyth would publish a novel inspired by the Lauri Love and Gary McKinnon stories. The novel, The Fox, was released in Autumn 2018.

== Personal life ==
As of the late 2010s, Love was in a long-term relationship with fashion model Sylvia Mann.

== See also ==
- Trust Machine: The Story of Blockchain
