= Murray Peden =

Canadian pilot and author (1923–2022)

David Murray Peden
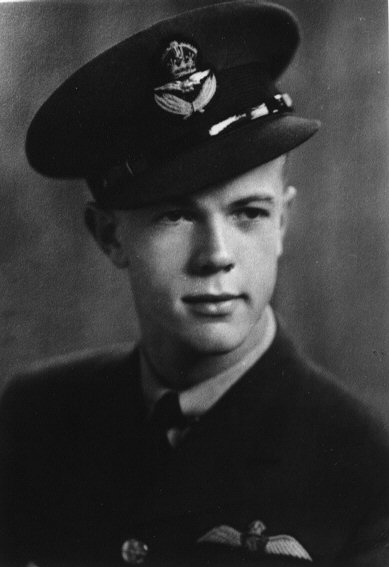
- Pilot Officer Peden on 23 October 1942
- Born: David Murray Peden; 19 October 1923; Winnipeg, Manitoba, Canada
- Died: 6 January 2022 (aged 98)
- Military career
- Allegiance: Canada
- Branch: Royal Canadian Air Force
- Service years: 1941–1945
- Rank: Flight Lieutenant
- Service number: J20216
- Units: No. 214 Squadron RAF; No. 161 Squadron RAF
- Conflicts: World War II
- Awards: DFC - 1944; MiD - 1946; Legion of Honour - 2017

Flight Lieutenant David Murray Peden DFC QC (19 October 1923 – 6 January 2022) was a Canadian air force officer, lawyer, and author. From 1941 to 1945 Peden served in the Royal Canadian Air Force as a bomber pilot and completed the majority of his tour of duty with No. 214 Squadron of RAF Bomber Command. Following the war he returned to Canada and became a lawyer in Winnipeg. Later in life he authored three books. He is best known for his 1979 memoir A Thousand Shall Fall, which former director of the Canadian Army Historical Section, C. P. Stacey, called "the best book any Canadian has written about his war experiences, and one of the best books about the war that has been written anywhere."

== Early life ==
David Murray Peden was born in Winnipeg, Manitoba on 19 October 1923 to William Peden (1893–1972) and Elsie Pearl Baldwin (1890–1987), and was the third of five children. Peden spent most of his youth in Portage la Prairie, where he attended Portage Collegiate Institute. He completed his secondary school at Gordon Bell High School in Winnipeg. Peden's father was Scottish-born and worked as a railroad clerk in Manitoba. The Pedens are descendants of the 17th century Scottish Covenanter Alexander Peden (1626–1686).

== World War II ==
=== Enlistment, training in Canada: October 1941 – November 1942 ===
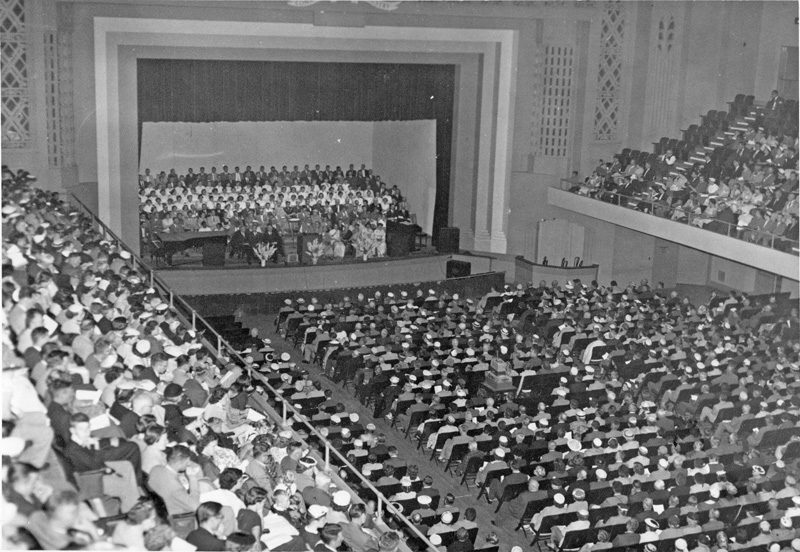
The Winnipeg Civic Auditorium, where Peden heard Billy Bishop speak in May 1941.

Prior to his 18th birthday, Peden had become intent on joining the Royal Canadian Air Force (RCAF). In the spring of 1941, aged 17, Peden attended a recruitment rally in the Winnipeg Auditorium at which Air Marshal Billy Bishop spoke. The rally enforced his enthusiasm to join upon turning 18. On the morning of Monday, 20 October 1941, the day after his 18th birthday, Peden visited the Lindsay Building where he enlisted in the RCAF, being given the rank of Aircraftsman Second Class and the service number R134578, and was ordered to report to No. 3 Manning Depot, Edmonton, on 6 November 1941. After a month in Edmonton, Peden was sent to No. 7 SFTS at RCAF Station Fort Macleod. Following training at Macleod, Peden was posted to No. 4 ITS, located at the Edmonton Normal School, reporting on 1 March 1942. On 23 April, Peden was assigned to flight school at No. 5 EFTS at RCAF Station High River. At High River, the new pilot learned to fly in de Havilland Tiger Moths, and on 16 May 1942, he made his first solo flight. After roughly 60 hours of flying time, Peden was given the option to transfer either to No. 7 SFTS in Macleod again, or to No. 10 SFTS at RCAF Station Dauphin. As the latter was a short train trip to his home in Winnipeg, he elected to go to Dauphin, leaving High River on 3 July. At Dauphin Peden trained extensively in Cessna Cranes. This training included formation flying. On 16 October 1942 he made his final flight at Dauphin, at which point his total flying time was approximately 225 hours. Peden left the station on 24 October, and while on leave at home, he received his commission in the mail on Monday, 26 October.

On 7 November 1942, Peden reported to No. 1 "Y" Depot in Halifax. In the afternoon on the 20th, he was ordered to pack, and was subsequently boarded on the ship S.S. Cavina. The crossing took 17 days, and the ship docked in Avonmouth. Upon disembarkment, Peden took the train to No. 3 Personnel Receiving Centre, RCAF in Bournemouth.

=== Training in England: November 1942 – September 1943 ===
Peden was sent to the Personnel Receiving Centre in Bournemouth where he was issued with battledress, identification, and clothing coupons. Along with ten other Canadian airmen, he billeted in the Burley Court Hotel. On 22 December he was granted seven days' leave, and subsequently traveled to Glasgow to spend Christmas with his aunt. On 29 January 1943, Peden was assigned to a fill-in posting for 12 days with the 14th Army Tank Regiment (Calgary Regiment), stationed in Worthing. After returning on 10 February, on the 26th he was posted to No. 6 EFTS at RAF Sywell. During this period, Peden and three other airmen billeted with a family in Northampton. While at Sywell, Peden continued his training in Tiger Moths, and in March was certified to fly with a bombaimer. On 23 March he was assigned to No. 20 (Pilot) Advanced Flying Unit at RAF Kidlington. The course at Kidlington included ground school, solo flying in Oxfords, cross-country flights to practise navigation, night flying, and beam approach training. On 18 May 1943 Peden reported to No. 12 Operational Training Unit at RAF Chipping Warden to begin his bomber training in Vickers Wellingtons. Peden noted his first impressions of the Wellington, saying, "[o]ur very first glimpse of the Wellington IIIs, squatting heavily in the dispersals ringing the drome at Chipping Warden, made us sharply aware of the nearer presence of the God of War. For the Wellingtons looked very much like what they were, battle-tested operational heavy bombers [...]." On the 29th he was assigned a crew, which included P/O J. B. Waters, Sgt. "Stan" Stanley, Sgt. Eddie Jarvis, and Sgt. Sam Mather. On 4 June Peden's crew transferred to RAF Edgehill to begin their flying training. The crew first flew together in a Wellington on 5 June, and on the 8th they first flew without an instructor in the plane. After 27 hours of flying time, the crew returned to RAF Chipping Warden. On 24/25 July, Peden's crew flew their first sortie over the Continent. This exercise was a leaflet drop at Montargis, France. By the beginning of August 1943, Peden had flown a total of 449 hours, and just under 84 in Wellingtons. The crew was ordered to report to No. 1657 Heavy Conversion Unit at RAF Stradishall on 5 August. The first two weeks of their time at Stradishall was spent in a ground course learning about the Short Stirling, the plane they would be flying. The crew also acquired an additional two members: flight engineer Bill Bailey and mid-upper gunner Bert Lester. On 22 August Peden first flew the Stirling, and did his first solo flight the next day. His last training flight came on 19 September, at which time he had accumulated 68 hours in the Stirling. Two days later, on 21 September, Peden and his crew were posted to No. 214 (FMS) Squadron, based out of RAF Chedburgh.

=== Operational tour: September 1943 – September 1944 ===
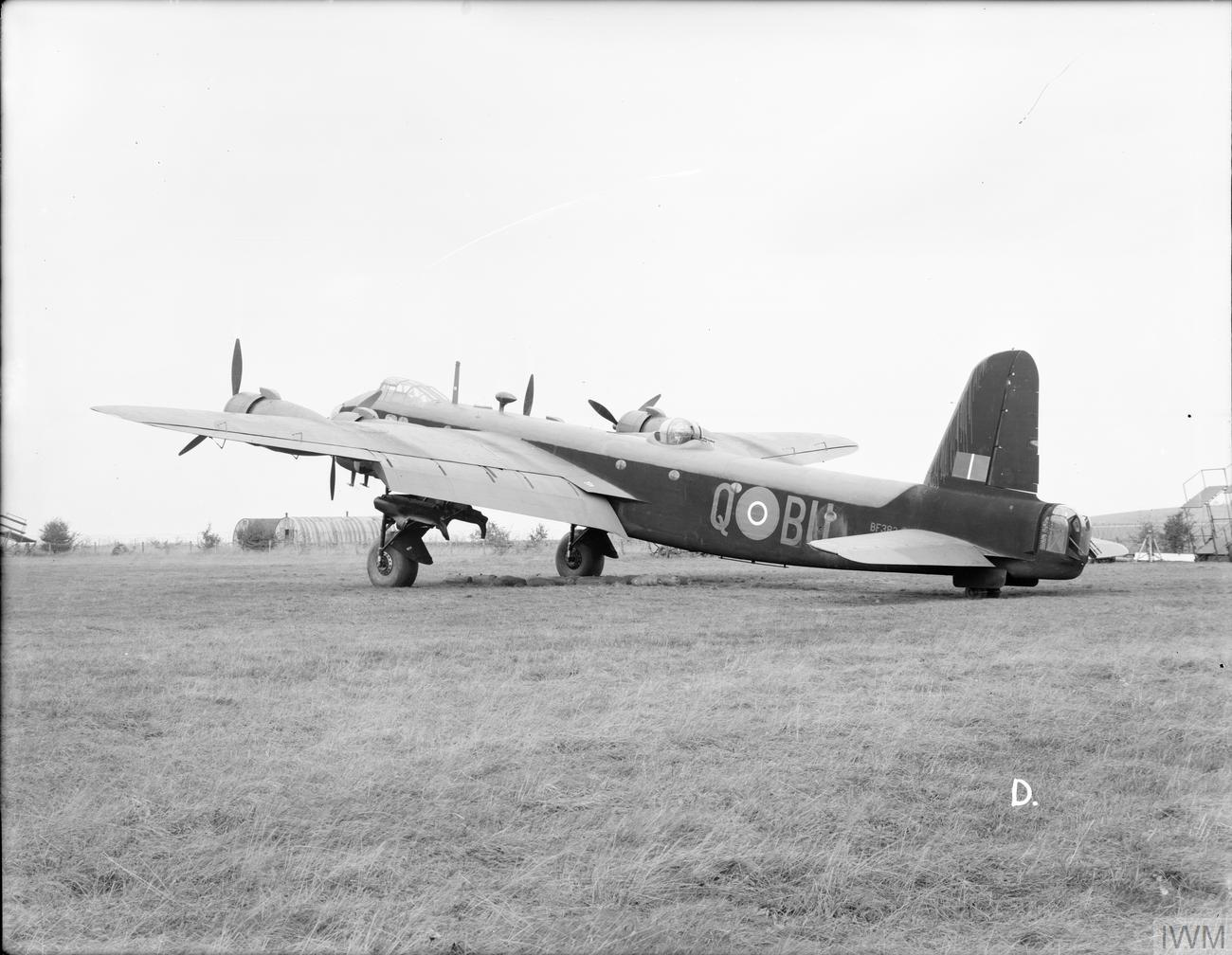
A 214 Squadron Short Stirling

Peden and his crew arrived at RAF Chedburgh late in the afternoon of 22 September, ready to begin the operational tour. At the time of his arrival, 214 was flying Short Stirlings. The night of his arrival Peden was assigned to fly as a co-pilot in a bombing raid on Hanover. Peden described his thoughts upon hearing of the target, saying, "I felt a tremour. Hanover struck me as a pretty deep penetration for my maiden effort into the fatherland." Following the sortie he explained his feeling of relief, stating, "[w]e had been flying for five hours and 25 minutes, and I had never experienced a sensation of relief quite as intoxicatingly satisfying as what I felt as I climbed out the rear doors and stepped onto the lovely, wonderful, marvelous, fabulous, solid old concrete of that good old dispersal." The following night Peden flew again as a co-pilot, this time in a raid on Mannheim. On the night of 25/26 September, Peden flew his first operational sortie with his own crew. This sortie was a "gardening" operation in the Frisians. Again on 2/3 October Peden's crew flew a gardening sortie, this time around Anholt Island. On 3/4 October the crew flew their first major bombing operation with Kassel as the target. The night of 8/9 October saw the crew fly a raid on Bremen. After this sixth sortie, on 15 October Peden and his crew were granted leave. At this time he returned to Glasgow to visit family again.

On the morning of 9 November 1943, Peden and crew were transferred to No. 161 Squadron at RAF Tempsford for temporary service. No. 161 Squadron, along with No. 138 Squadron, were highly secretive units working in conjunction with Special Air Service and Special Operations Executive to deliver material to the French Resistance. The day of his arrival at Tempsford, Peden was notified that he would be flying as co-pilot that night. Before the evening's sortie, King George and Queen Elizabeth visited the station to inspect the crews that would fly that night, and later joined them for afternoon tea in the officers' mess. The next night Peden again flew as a co-pilot. After a practice drop at Henlow on 12/13 November, Peden subsequently flew supply drops with his own crew on 15 and 18 November. They later flew in a mining raid on the Le Havre harbour on the night of 22/23 November, and then had an aborted sortie on 11 December.

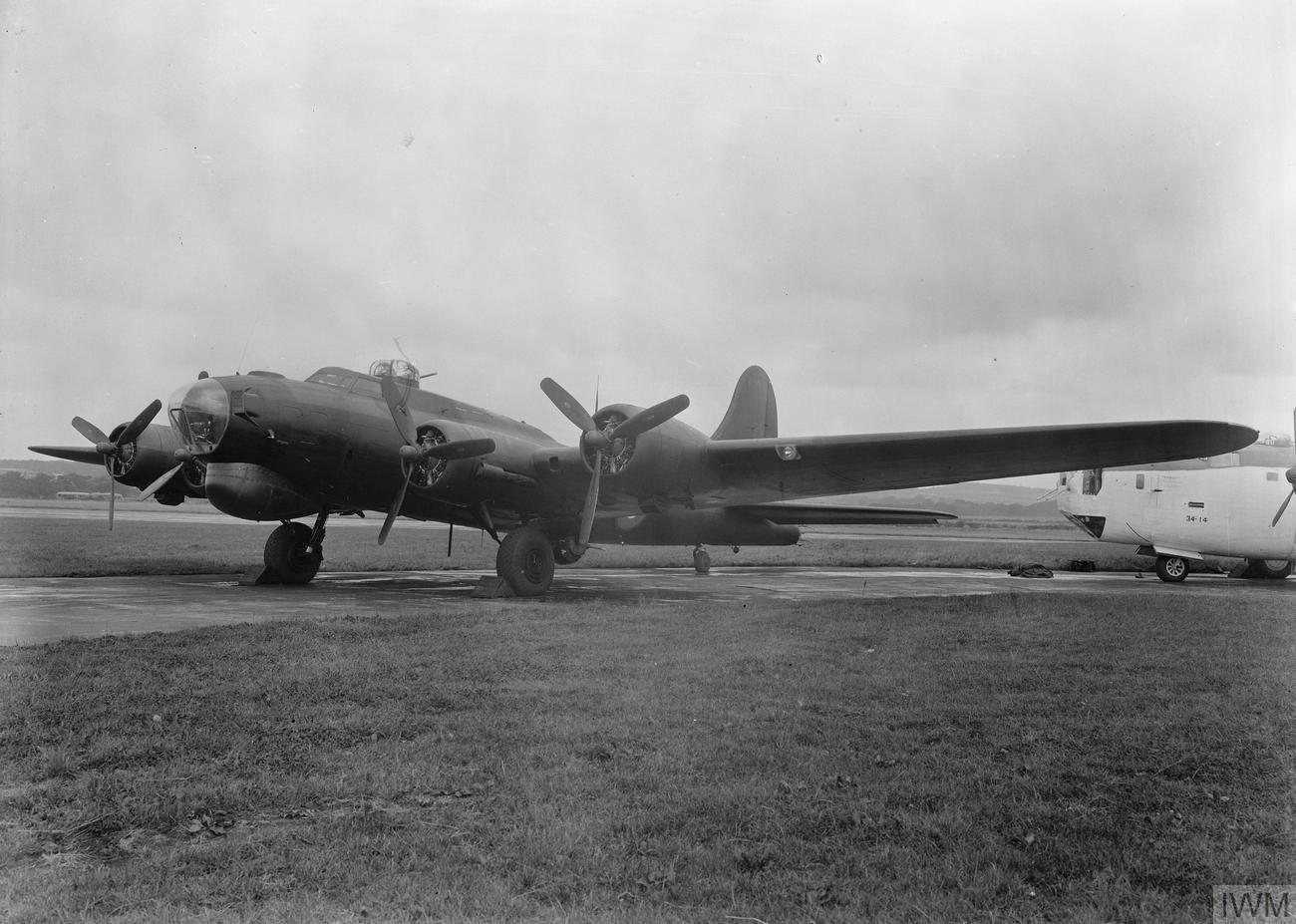
A 214 Squadron Boeing B-17, August 1944

Peden and crew rejoined 214 Squadron, which had been posted to RAF Downham Market, on 13 December, and on the 18th was granted leave. On 4 January 1944 Peden flew a raid on the Bristillerie V-1 launching site in the Pas-de-Calais. This was his 13th operation, and the final one he would fly in a Stirling. After a short repose, on 17 January 214 Squadron was transferred to RAF Sculthorpe where it would become part of the new No. 100 Group RAF, a radar countermeasures unit. The squadron would now fly the American Boeing B-17 Flying Fortress, and would be trained on it by members of the United States Army Air Forces. Through February and March the airmen of 214 acclimatized themselves to the B-17, and from 4 to 12 April, Peden's crew flew exercises with the Bomber Development Unit at RAF Newmarket. On the night of 24/25 April, after nearly 15 weeks of operations, Peden flew a sortie on Karlsruhe. In this first sortie as part of 100 Group, the crew undertook its new supporting duty of disrupting VHF communication between German controllers and pilots. The crew flew again on 8/9 May, this time to Haine-Sainte-Pierre. On 16 May 214 Squadron transferred to RAF Oulton, where the officers took their living quarters near Blickling Hall. During their time at Oulton, the men of 214 Squadron met Margaret Lockwood and James Mason, who were filming The Wicked Lady at Blickling Hall. Peden flew next on 19/20 May on a sortie to Le Mans. On the night of 5 June, the night before the Invasion of Normandy, Peden's crew was selected to fly a patrol along the French coast in support of 15 Lancasters that would bomb coastal batteries. Unaware that this was the morning of the Invasion, Peden described what he saw on his return flight to England, saying,

We left the French coast behind, continuing our descent, and headed back towards England. It was not yet daylight, but the darkness had begun to soften. Suddenly we saw a sight that brought a lump into my throat. A tremendous, awesome aerial armada was passing us in extended formation a mile or two on our left side – not bombers, but C-47s: an airborne army. They were going in. We were coming out. For a long minute I watched them sailing silently onward to their date with destiny.

Peden's most harrowing sortie came on 21/22 June. The target this night was the Nordstern synthetic oil plant at Gelsenkirchen. En route to the target, Peden's B-17 was attacked by cannon fire from an enemy night fighter, setting on fire the starboard-inner engine, and attacked anew a few minutes later by the same aircraft. Roughly 10 minutes from the target, Peden reversed course to return to England. While crash landing at RAF Woodbridge, their damaged Fortress plowed through a bomb laden 61 Squadron Lancaster that had crash landed just prior to them, Peden and his crew quickly fled from their plane fearing an explosion. For his actions returning the plane home that night, Peden received the Distinguished Flying Cross.

Following Gelsenkirchen, Peden's next sortie, which was also his 20th, was to Paris on the night of 14/15 July. Subsequent sorties included Châlons-sur-Marne (22/23 July), Stuttgart (28/29 July), unknown (7/8 August), Overflakkee (13/14 August), Kiel (16/17 August), screening (17/18 August), and Heligoland (25/26 August). Peden's 30th and final sortie was a raid on Königsberg the night of 29/30 August. On 7 September the Wing Commander informed Peden that his tour was finished.

=== Teaching, homecoming: September 1944 – August 1945 ===
On 9 September 1944, Peden began his career as an instructor at 1699 Heavy Conversion Unit at RAF Oulton. It was the responsibility of this unit to supply pilots to No. 214 Squadron and No. 223 Squadron. That December he took the six-day Bomber Command Tactics course at RAF Ingham. On 30 May 1945, 22 days after VE Day, Peden and his crew flew once more over Germany to observe the bombing damage. During this trip Peden detoured over Gelsenkirchen, at which time Stan Stanley urinated out the opening in the side of the B-17 onto the Nordstern plant below. On 27 June Peden was transferred to RAF Linton-on-Ouse, where he stayed for six days, after which time he was posted to RAF Dishforth. Around 14 July Peden attended a special investiture ceremony for Canadians held at Buckingham Palace. There the King presented the pilot with his DFC. After another week at Dishforth, Peden took the train to Liverpool and on 22 July embarked for Canada on HMT Stratheden. The ship arrived in Wolfe's Cove on 31 July, and on 1 August Peden boarded a westbound train. In the early morning of 3 August 1945 Peden arrived at Winnipeg Union Station where he was met by his father.

== Post-war ==
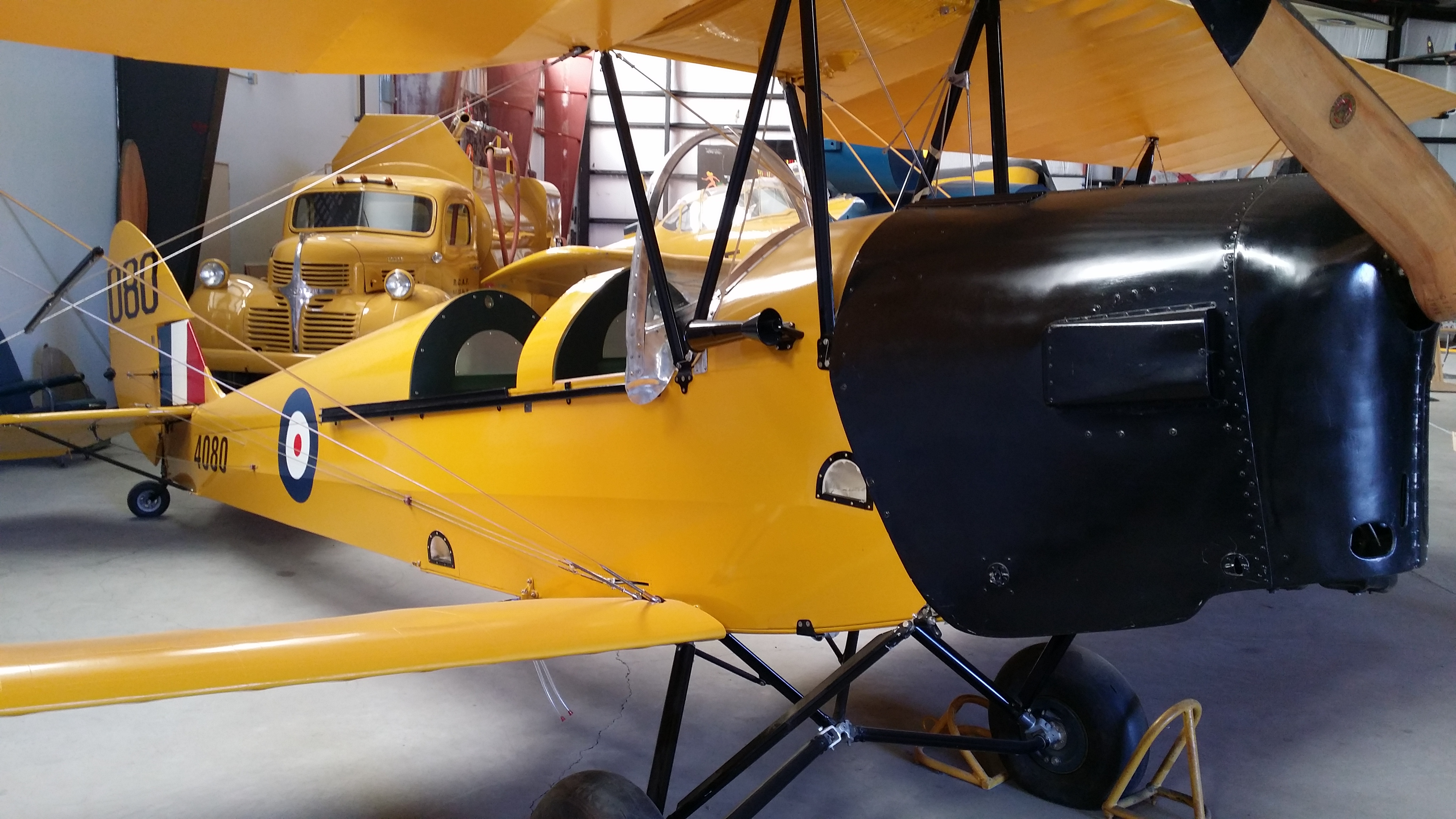
The "Peden" Tiger Moth at Nanton

Following the War Peden entered United College, University of Manitoba, where he graduated Bachelor of Arts in 1948. On 29 April 1949 he married his classmate Jean Douglas Barker (1927–2018), with whom he had three children. In September 1948 Peden entered law school at the University of Manitoba. He graduated Bachelor of Laws in 1952 and was admitted to the Manitoba Bar that same year. Peden's legal career began as a Crown Attorney, Province of Manitoba (1952–55), and subsequently included private practice (1955–57), General Counsel, Greater Winnipeg Transit Commission (1957–60), Corporate Council, Metropolitan Corporation of Greater Winnipeg (1960–61), Assistant Deputy Minister, Municipal Affairs (1961–64), and Deputy Minister, Public Utilities (1964–68). Peden was made Queen's Counsel in December 1964. In 1968 he became the first Chairman of the Manitoba Securities Commission, a position he held until his retirement in 1988 at age 65.

Peden has also served as Director, Atlantic Council of Canada (1981–90), Governor, Manitoba Branch, Canadian Corps of Commissioners (1985–86), Director, Wartime Pilots and Observers Association, and was a life member of the Winnipeg Trap and Skeet Club.

For many years Peden has been a supporter of the Bomber Command Museum of Canada, located in Nanton, Alberta, near RCAF Station High River. In 2008 the museum acquired de Havilland Tiger Moth 1405 and restored the plane to its wartime appearance. As a tribute to Peden and a token of gratitude for his support, the museum elected to finish the plane in the livery of Tiger Moth 4080, the plane Peden made his first solo flight in on 16 May 1942 at High River. In response to the museum's proposal, Peden responded, "This is a tribute I will never forget, I assure you; and I am absolutely delighted that you are inclined to make this gesture. Apart from the great distinction you thus confer on me, your actions, to my mind, mark a deeply satisfying recognition of the wartime service of so many other young men at No. 5 EFTS, High River, and I find that richly rewarding indeed."

Peden died on 6 January 2022, at the age of 98.

== Writing ==
In the mid-1970s Peden took up writing. His first book, Fall of an Arrow, was published in 1978, and was one of the earliest book-length accounts of the development and cancellation of the Avro Canada CF-105 Arrow project. In the book, Peden argued against the Diefenbaker government's decision to cancel the Arrow project, although he suggested that had the government of the time been Liberal, it too would have likely cancelled the plane. He described the decision as "among the most serious mistakes made by a Canadian politician in peacetime, and it was based upon a culpably restricted assessment of some of the most important factors in the situation." Further, he argued that after the cancellation of the project, rather than scrapping the completed planes, the government should have transferred them to the RCAF for testing and research. This would have been the same course of action taken by the US Air Force after the cancellation of the North American F-107.

Peden's second book, and the work for which he remains best-known, was the memoir A Thousand Shall Fall: A Pilot in 214, published in 1979. The book recounts the author's military service, from his enlistment in Winnipeg in 1941, through his service with Bomber Command in England, his return home, to post-War reunions with fellow pilots. Peden's account depicts the gamut of wartime experiences, including humorous episodes from leaves, terror while in combat, and the desolation after learning of friends’ deaths.

A Thousand Shall Fall received widespread praise. Reviewing the book in 1984, C. P. Stacey, former director of the Canadian Army Historical Section, said:

[it] is, within the limits of my knowledge, the best book any Canadian has written about his war experiences, and one of the best books about the war that has been written anywhere. […] A Thousand Shall Fall seems to me to have in it the stuff of a genuine Canadian classic. Canadians will be reading it, I hope, many years from now, when most of the 'award-winning' books of our day have passed into oblivion.

In a letter to the author dated 29 November 1979, former Marshal of the Royal Air Force Sir Arthur Harris wrote:

I have just finished reading your book – in fact I found it hard to put down. I consider it not only the best and most true-to-life “war” book I’ve read about this War, but the best about all the wars of my lifetime – from the Boer War onwards. [...] at times it made me so sad that I found it hard to retain the moisture within my eyes.

A Thousand Shall Fall was first published by Canada's Wings in 1979, with a second edition in 1982. A new edition was released by Stoddart Publishing in 1988 with a reprint in 2000. In 2002 Stoddart ceased operations. Norman Shannon wrote of the situation, “[w]hen Stoddart Publishers succumbed to financial pressures among other things, history buffs mourned the loss of a classic book on WWII aviation, assuming that the most personal yet comprehensive account of Canadian airmen in WWII would be lost.” In 2004, however, Dundurn Press acquired the title and released a new printing. The book remains in print today.

Peden's final book was Hearken to the Evidence, published in 1983. This final work was a humorous account of his legal career.

=== Bibliography ===
- Fall of an Arrow. Stittsville, Ontario: Canada's Wings, 1978.
- A Thousand Shall Fall: A Pilot for 214. Stittsville, Ontario: Canada's Wings, 1979.
- Hearken to the Evidence. Stittsville, Ontario: Canada's Wings, 1983.
