= Stradishall =

Village in Suffolk, England

Coordinates: 52.1428°N 00.5504°E

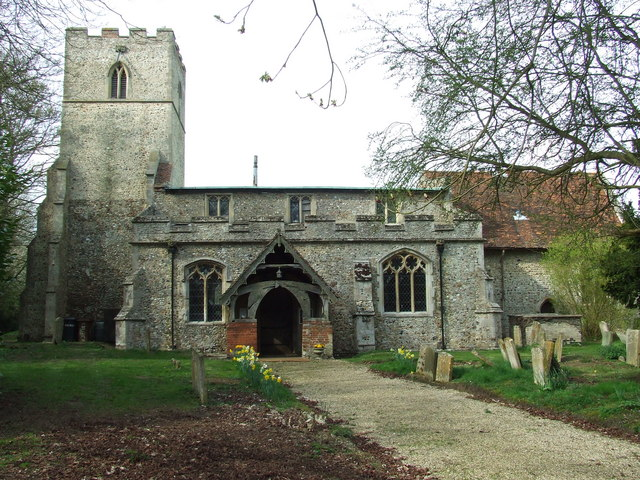
- St. Margaret's Church

- Location within Suffolk
- Population: 451 (2011)
- OS grid reference: TL7452
- Civil parish: Stradishall
- District: West Suffolk
- Shire county: Suffolk
- Region: East
- Country: England
- Sovereign state: United Kingdom
- Post town: NEWMARKET
- Postcode district: CB8
- Dialling code: 01440
- Police: Suffolk
- Fire: Suffolk
- Ambulance: East of England
- UK Parliament: West Suffolk

Stradishall is a village and civil parish in West Suffolk in the English county of Suffolk. It is five miles northwest of Clare and nine miles northeast of Haverhill.

The civil parish includes a number of hamlets including Farley Green.

The Royal Air Force operated an airfield near Stradishall, RAF Stradishall, which was operational between 1938 and 1970. The former airfield is now the site of two category C prisons: HMP Highpoint North and HMP Highpoint South. Part of the former airfield remains a MOD training site which is closed to the public.

There is a memorial to RAF Stradishall outside Stirling House which was once part of the officers' quarters and now is a training unit for the Prison service. The village has an Anglican church dedicated to St Margaret.

== Notable residents ==
- Lauri Love, activist and alleged computer system hacker.
- Brenda Rawnsley, arts campaigner who worked as a librarian here.
