= HM Prison Highpoint South =

Prison in Suffolk England

Coordinates: 52°08′16″N 0°30′50″E

HMP Highpoint
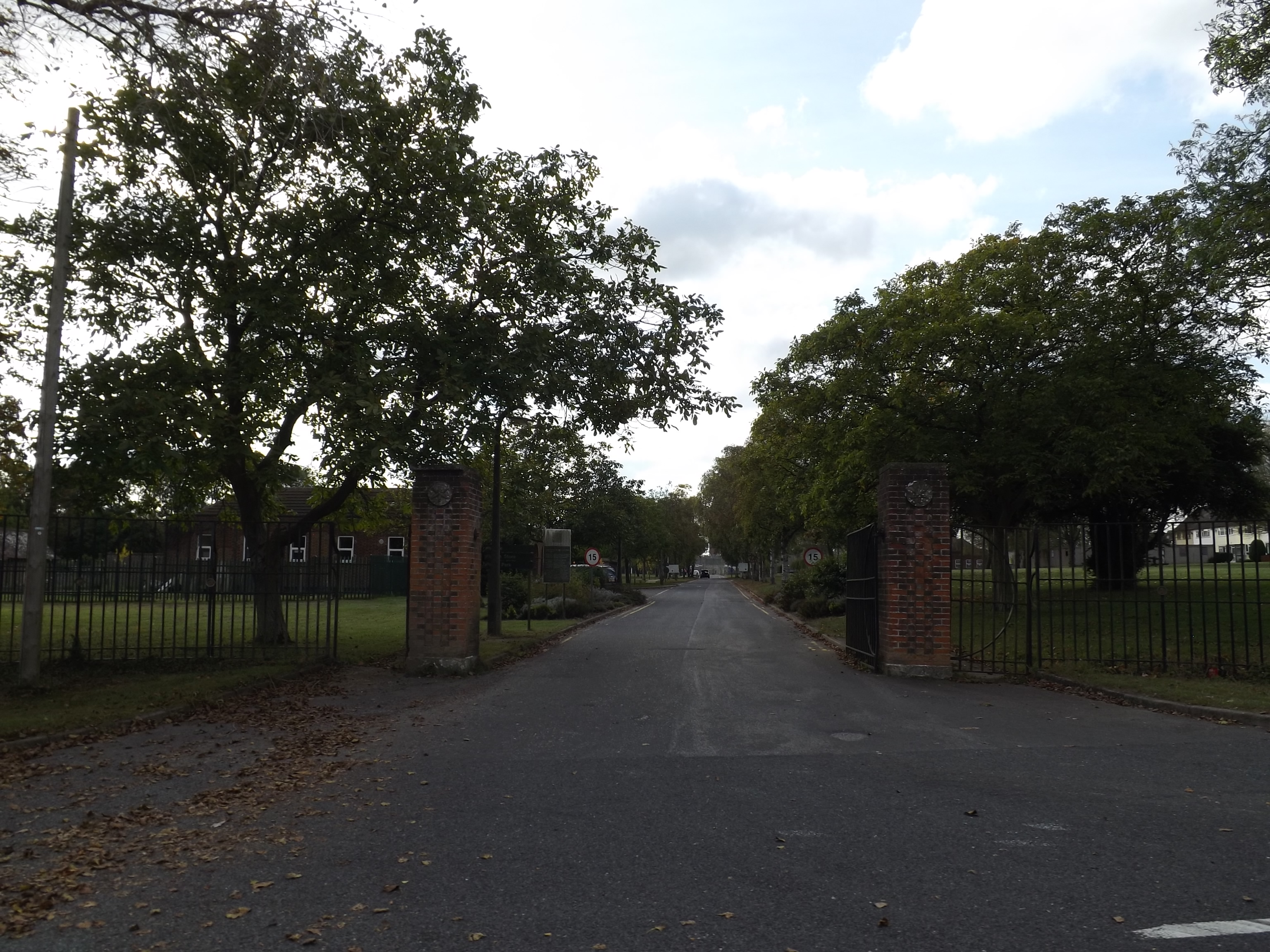
- Entrance to HMP Highpoint (South)
- Interactive map of HMP Highpoint
- Location: Stradishall, Suffolk
- Security class: Adult Male/Category C
- Population: 1357 (January 2022)
- Opened: 1975
- Managed by: HM Prison Services
- Governor: Nigel Smith
- Website: Highpoint South at justice.gov.uk

HM Prison Highpoint South (formerly called Highpoint prison) is a Category C men's prison, located in the village of Stradishall (near Haverhill) in Suffolk, England. The prison is operated by His Majesty's Prison Service.

== History ==
The site of the prison opened in 1938 as an RAF base. On its closure in 1970, the RAF base was briefly converted into a transit camp for Ugandan refugees.

In 1977, Highpoint Prison was opened, initially providing cells for male prisoners only, having been built by the prisoners themselves. Using prison labour instead of outside contractors saved £2 million on the overall cost of construction. In 1997, the North part of Highpoint became a women's prison. On 3 October 2003, two years after the July 2001 separation of the North and South prisons, the North prison became Edmunds Hill.

In February 2003 it emerged that two women drug therapy workers were ordered out of the prison after they were confronted with allegations that they had had inappropriate relationships with two male prisoners. The workers' employer Addaction subsequently lost its contract for therapy at the prison.

In May 2005 the Independent Monitoring Board criticised conditions at the prison. An investigation by the Board revealed that many inmates were forced to share single cells, and healthcare was not up to standard at the jail.

A further report by the Independent Monitoring Board in May 2007 described accommodation at the prison as unfit for purpose. The report also criticised the lack of training opportunities for inmates and low morale among staff at the prison.

In 2011, the prison was renamed Highpoint South Prison, while Edmunds Hill was renamed Highpoint North Prison.

On 26 January 2026 it was reported by the BBC that a prisoner had died in hospital after being stabbed at the prison on the 23rd. As of 31 January 2026 a murder investigation is taking place.

== The prison today ==
Highpoint South Prison holds convicted adult Category C male prisoners, serving up to and including life sentences for murderers. Accommodation at the prison comprises ten living units, all of which are purpose-built with integral sanitation, in cell electricity and in cell television.

Prisoners are employed within a range of workshops, offending behaviour courses, full-time education classes and resettlement workshops. Workshops include tailoring, welding and fabrication, private sector contract services and an outdoor market garden. The Education department offers qualifications in art and design, key skills, basic skills, literacy and numeracy, social and life skills, business studies, computing and English for Speakers of Other Languages.

A staffed visits centre opens at Highpoint South at lunch time for refreshments and facilities. Within the prison's Visits Hall tea, coffee and soft drinks are available. There is also a Prison Visitor Centre which is operated by the Ormiston Children and Families Trust.

== Notable inmates ==
=== Former ===
- Giovanni Di Stefano
- Jay Emmanuel-Thomas
- Blake Fielder-Civil
- Tony Martin
- George Michael
- Lester Piggott
