= Karen Todner =

British solicitor (born 1962)

- Born: April 1962 (age 64); Nuneaton, Warwickshire, England
- Education: Higham Lane School
- Alma mater: University of Exeter
- Occupation: Solicitor
- Spouse: Ian Jobling
- Children: 3
- Website: www.karentodner.com

Karen Elizabeth Todner (born April 1962) is an English solicitor. Her clients include hacker Ryan Cleary linked with LulzSec, Gary McKinnon known as the "Pentagon Hacker", and Lauri Love.

== Early life ==
Todner was born in Nuneaton where she attended Higham Lane School, a secondary school located in Nuneaton, Warwickshire. She graduated with an LLB from University of Exeter.

== Career ==
Todner qualified as a solicitor in 1987 and in her 20s became a founding member of Kaim Todner LLP, a law firm in London. Kaim Todner solicitors was formed in 1990 specialising in criminal law, with particular expertise in extradition. In the beginning of March 2016 Todner's practise was acquired by One Legal, an Alternative business structure originally set up in 2013. This came shortly after Todner announced her intention to close the practice due to Legal Aid cuts. Since acquisition by One Legal, Todner's firm Kaim Todner continued operating under the same name as part of One Legal alternative business. Karen left Kaim Todner and One Legal in September 2017. Karen continues to practice and can be found at Karentodner.com. She is a regular commentator on criminal law and extradition.

== Notable cases ==
=== Gary McKinnon ===
Todner appeared in a number of extradition cases. An early case was her successful defence of Gary McKinnon, which has set a new legal precedent in British law. McKinnon's legal team applied for a judicial review into the Home Secretary's rejection of medical evidence, which stated that, when he could easily be tried in the UK, it was unnecessary, cruel and inhumane to inflict the further stress of removing him from his homeland, his family and his medical support network.

=== Ryan Cleary ===
Starting in 2011, Todner represented Ryan Cleary allegedly linked with Anonymous, who was accused in the UK of conspiring to bring down the websites of the CIA, the Serious Organised Crime Agency, and co-ordinating attacks against a number of US government websites. Cleary was indicted in 2012 by US federal grand jury however Todner stated that they wouldn't be seeking his extradition, should Cleary be dealt with by British courts in respect of these charges. In June 2011 Met Police had also charged Cleary, who is diagnosed with Asperger's syndrome, for alleged involvement in web assaults against the British Phonographic Industry and the International Federation of the Phonographic Industry. Cleary was imprisoned in 2012 but was released shortly after, following a successful appeal.

=== Lauri Love ===
Starting in the winter of 2013, Todner started representing Lauri Love, British student who was arrested on suspicion of hacking into US military computers. Love is accused of committing the cyber attacks as part of a "hacktivist" campaign in 2012 and 2013 to protest the death of Aaron Swartz, a computer programmer who committed suicide while facing up to 35 years in US prison for charges of computer misuse. In September 2016 decision has been made to extradite Love to US. Todner said she's "as confident as I can be" about the appeal. More than 100 MPs showed support for Love's campaign to have his extradition order overturned on health grounds. In October 2016 it was announced that MP Barry Sheerman, chair of the Parliamentary Commission on Autism will write to President Obama, asking him to throw out the extradition request before he leaves office in January 2017. On Wednesday 12 October 2016, in the House of Commons during the Prime Ministers Questions, David Burrowes MP raised the case of Lauri Love and issues such as the difficulties faced by those with various forms of autism when they come into contact with the justice system. Others, including the National Autistic Society, Liberty, and The Courage Foundation, showed their support for Love's appeal. By 24 October, 105 cross-party backbenchers signed a letter to President Obama, raising "deep concern for safety" of Lauri Love, pointing out that he has "a long history of serious mental health issues, depression and some episodes of psychosis". In November 2016 Home Secretary Amber Rudd has backed decision to extradite Love to America. Todner stated she fears he will be driven to suicide if extradited, and is lodging an appeal against Home Office's decision. In a letter to the Home Office opposing Love's extradition because of the risk of suicide, she wrote "We.. urge you to recognise the seriousness of Mr Love's mental illness and withdraw the request for extradition to permit prosecution to proceed in England, where Mr Love would be able to stand trial on bail with the support of his close family and medical support network." Love said Home Secretary should have refused to send him to the US for trial and called Home Secretary's decision to extradite him an ‘aberration of justice’ as his legal team Kaim Todner solicitors pointed out that no other UK citizen accused of hacking had been extradited to the US. Todner also stated that the Home Secretary should have refused to extradite Love because UK–US extradition treaty of 2003 is unfair and should be repealed. On 25 April 2017 High Court accepted Love's appeal against extradition, lodged by Todner on his behalf. No hearing date has yet been set, however Todner commented: "The reason permission has been granted is that the High Court acknowledge that the grounds raised some issues of great importance. We are delighted for these news for Lauri and will continue to do everything we can to ensure prevention of his extradition to the United States of America."

=== David McIntyre ===
Starting in 2012 Todner represented David McIntyre, Queen's Lancashire Regiment soldier and a war veteran who served in Afghanistan, Bosnia, Northern Ireland and Iraq Mclntyre was accused of overcharging a US peace group for a security contract when he was running his own firm which employed a team of 20 to provide security to American clients, including the Iraqi ambassador to the US, and of overcharging US government for security services in Baghdad, Iraq. McIntyre left the Army in 2002 and set up security company called Quantum Risk. The eight counts of fraud McIntyre was charged with relate to claims that he overcharged a US peace group for a security contract when he was running Quantum Risk between December 2008 and July 2009. McIntyre's business closed in 2009, which followed by his enrolment in the Royal Military Police, for whom he served in Afghanistan. In July 2012 McIntyre was arrested in uniform in an operational setting in Afghanistan, flown out of the country 45 minutes later, and then appeared in Westminster Magistrates Court in London 36 hours later. McIntyre faced eight counts of fraud concerning a contract with the United States Institute of Peace (USIP). It was alleged he overcharged the organisation by 100,000 US dollars (£65,000). After the US extradition request was approved by Home Secretary Theresa May, McIntyre appealed, submitting a report from the British Army's consultant psychiatrist confirming that he suffered from PTSD. Todner commented that her firm will consider in detail the Secretary of State's conclusion and see whether they can seek Judicial Review of her decision.

=== Michael Sandford ===
In June 2016 Todner started representing Michael Steven Sandford, British teenager from Dorking, Surrey who overstayed his US visa and was arrested at the Republican rally at Treasure Island Casino in Las Vegas, after he tried to grab a police officer's gun in an attempt to "shoot and kill" Donald Trump. Sandford began a conversation with a Las Vegas Metropolitan Police officer and then attempted to grab the officer's gun in order to assassinate Trump, but failed in his attempt, according to court documents filed in the U.S. District of Nevada court. After his arrest, Sandford told the police that he had driven from California to Las Vegas in order to "kill Trump." He also said that, "If he were on the street tomorrow, he would try this again". Sanford also stated that he expected to die from the assassination attempt. The police have learned that he had gone to a gun range in Las Vegas the day before the Trump rally to learn to shoot a Glock 9 mm pistol. Sandford told a police officer that he wanted Trump's autograph before trying to grab the officer's gun. Later, In a police interview, he told detectives he was ‘trying to shoot and kill Donald Trump’. At the time of his arrest, Sandford remained in the country illegally. Sandford's mother subsequently revealed she wants Sandford deported back to Britain but it later emerged Sandford had an expired passport, preventing him from leaving the United States. During the trial his parents acknowledged that their son was living in the United States illegally but commented that they had no knowledge about it. On 13 December 2016 Sandford was sentenced to 12 months imprisonment at federal court in Las Vegas, Nevada, after pleading guilty in September 2016 to charges of being an illegal alien and in possession of a firearm and disrupting an official function. Las Vegas federal court learnt that Sandford did not have permission to be in the US after overstaying his tourist visa. In a course of proceedings it emerged that Sandford drove from California to Vegas with intent to harm Trump. He arrived in Las Vegas on 16 June and went to the Battlefield Vegas gun range to learn how to use a gun the day before the rally. Sandford's legal team stated that Sandford suffers a number of mental health problems and he was diagnosed as having had a psychotic episode at the time of the incident. Sentencing Sandford to 12 months and a day in prison, Judge James Mahan acknowledged he has a medical problem telling him he "should not be ashamed or embarrassed about it" and that he needs medication. According to medical experts, Sandford is autistic and was suffering a psychotic episode at the time of the incident. Walking out of Las Vegas federal courthouse after the sentencing of her son, Sandford's mother stated that Sandford is highly remorseful over what he did.

=== Andrew Townshend ===
In May 2016 Todner represented Andrew Townshend, RAF flight lieutenant serving with the RAF for over 30 years and completing 5,500 flying hours, who allegedly sent plane carrying 187 British military personnel plunging 4,400 ft when his camera jammed the controls, whilst en route to Afghanistan. The incident took place over the Black Sea during Airbus A330 Voyager flight from RAF Brize Norton to Camp Bastion in Afghanistan in 2014. Townshend was subsequently cleared of two counts of perjury after admitting he allowed his digital camera to jam his military airliner’s controls whilst he had been using his camera to take photographs of other aircraft from the cockpit and had taken 95 shots that day. Townshend admitted that he put his Nikon DSLR down between the armrest of his captain’s chair and the airliner’s main control stick, mounted on the side of the cockpit. During the flight Townshend moved his seat forward a couple of minutes later the camera was rammed into the stick, sending the aircraft into a sudden dive where the peak rate of descent was 15,000 feet per minute whilst the aircraft descended 4,400 ft in 33 seconds.

=== Tom Hayes ===
In May 2016 Todner was instructed by Tom Hayes, London trader who was convicted of fraud in March 2016 over alleged multi-million bonus payments. Hayes became the first trader to stand trial and receive a custodial sentence over the criminal fixing of international bank lending rates. Hayes has an eight-year-old son. His wife Sarah Tighe is a solicitor with Watson Farley & Williams in London. After Hayes' conviction Tighe set up crowdfunding to raise funds towards legal costs of Hayes' appeal. It was announced that Todner will be taking his case to the Criminal Cases Review Commission which looks into claims of miscarriages of justice. Hayes father Nick, a former TV producer, commented about Hayes conviction: 'I'm horrified, shocked and appalled by a sentence which seems brutal in the extreme and well out of line with other people who have done far more harmful things in far more vicious ways.'

== Awards and honours ==
- In 2012, Todner received a Legal Personality of The Year Award as a recognition for her work on high-profile extradition cases including Gary McKinnon

== Personal life ==
Todner is married to criminal defence barrister Ian Jobling and has three sons.

== See also ==
- Criminal defence
- Computer security
- Cyber security
- Extradition
