= Lindsay Building =

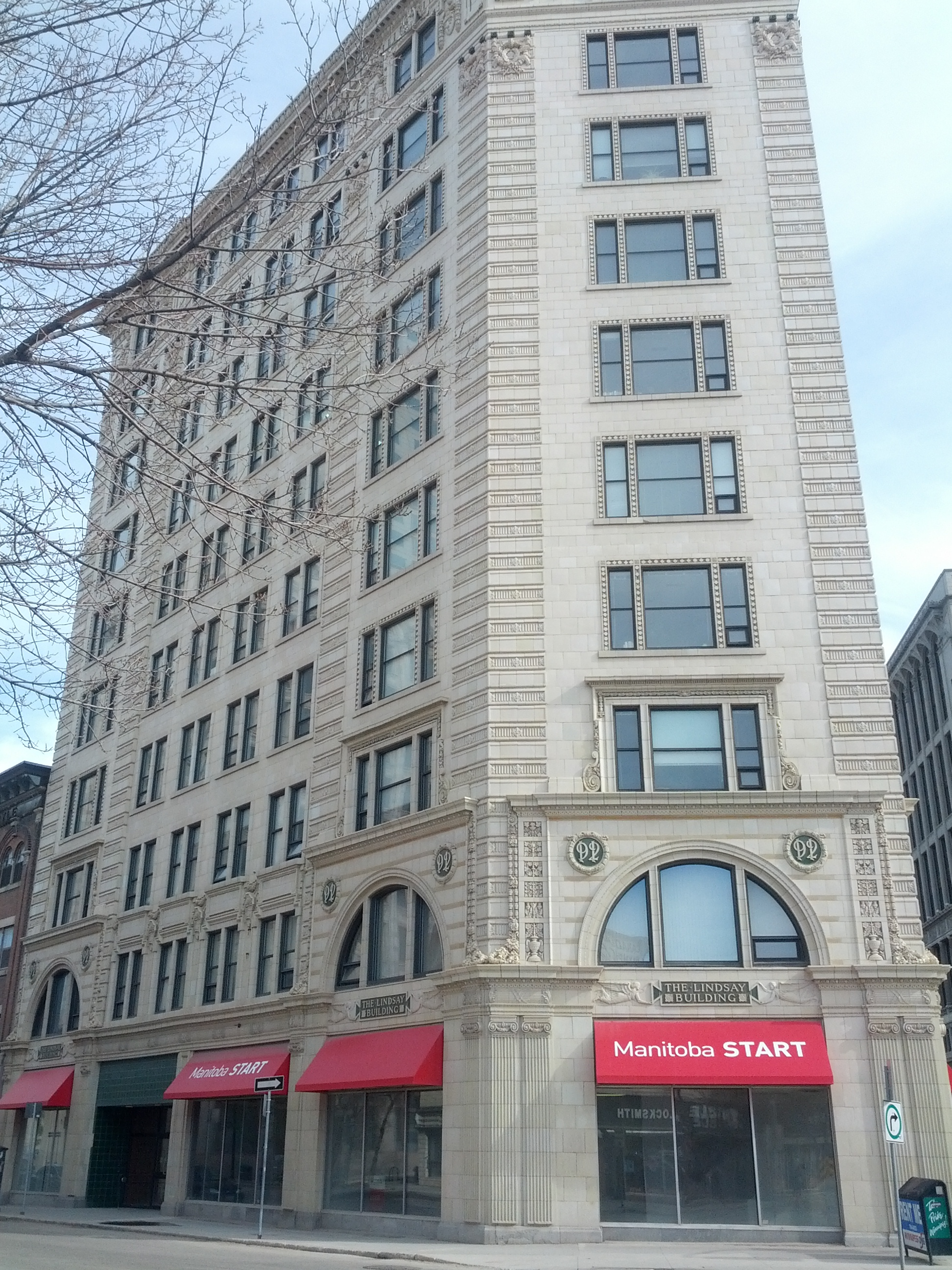

General information
- Type: Residential (originally office)
- Location: 228 Notre Dame Avenue; Winnipeg, Manitoba; R3B 1N7
- Coordinates: 49.89551°N 97.141245°W
- Named for: Frank Lindsay
- Opened: December 1912
- Cost: CA$193,000
- Owner: Smith Agency Ltd.

Technical details
- Material: terra-cotta
- Floor count: 10

Design and construction
- Architecture firm: Woodman and Carey
- Main contractor: Kelly-Simpson Company

The Lindsay Building is a ten-storey terracotta apartment building in the downtown core of Winnipeg, Manitoba, Canada. Located at 228 Notre Dame Avenue, it abuts Ellice Avenue and Garry Street, forming a mostly triangular floor plate.

The structure was erected during Winnipeg's pre-World War I development boom.

== Construction ==
Constructed during a 14-month period between 1911 and 1912, the building was designed as an office building for entrepreneur Frank Lindsay by local architects John Woodman and Raymond Carey, who had previously designed the Paris building on Portage Avenue.

The building's location was conveniently directly beside the Oxford Hotel, another property already owned by Lindsay. Originally planned as a 7-storey building, three additional storeys were added to the plan after construction had already begun.

The building was constructed by the Kelly-Simpson Company at a cost of CA$193,000, and was prepared for occupancy in December 1912.

== Design ==
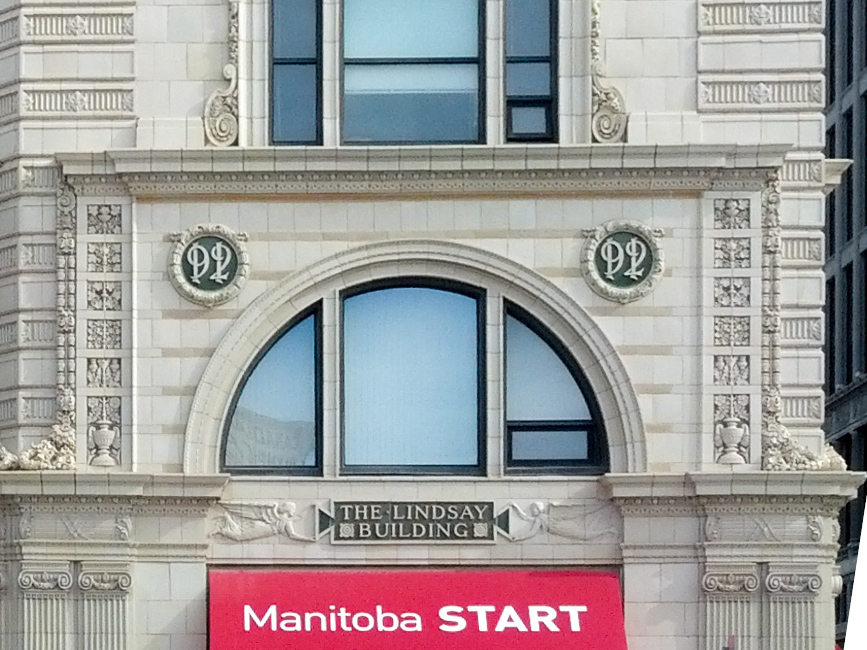
Exterior details of the Lindsay Building's second floor

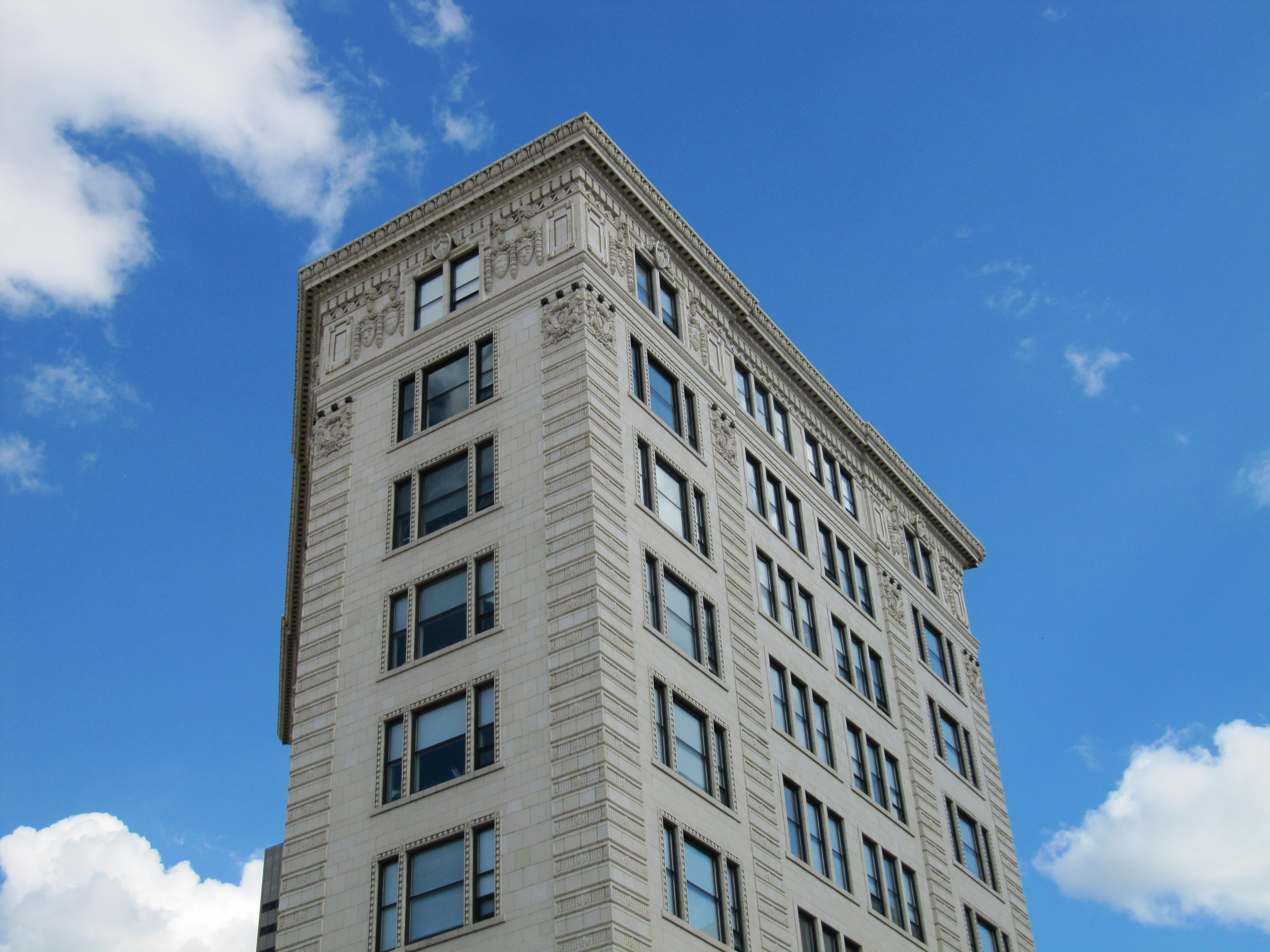
Top storeys' exterior details

The building features reinforced concrete slab construction, which was unusual at the time, when steel framed buildings were common. The exterior of the building features a sheathing of cream-coloured terracotta, cartouches, pilasters capped with Ionic capitals, as well as garlands of flowers around the semicircular second floor windows. The exterior is also ornamented with ten green wreaths bearing "1912" (the year of construction) as well as a pair of terracotta angel wings beneath each window, and five plaques identifying it as the Lindsay Building.

The building has undergone some alterations since it was built, including removal of entranceways and glass transoms in what are now bay windows. The original awnings have also been removed.

For many years the building featured a large aerial on top which was decorated with the code letters for CJOB.

In 2002, the Lindsay Building was announced to have the top seven stories converted into 35 affordable rental apartments, as it had been empty for several years. The owners of the building, Brad and Dale Ostrum, received CA$300,000 for the project from CentreVenture Development Corp.

== Tenants ==
The building originally housed shops, including a confectioner, the Harstone Brothers Fuel Company, the Sprague Lumber Company office, and a drug store. During the 1920s, much of the Garry Street shop space was occupied by the Provincial Savings Office, along with the Clark and Martin stock brokerage firm. One unit was used as a tailor shop by first Harry Greenberg, and later Palay Tailors. The main floor featured the offices of CJOB for many years on the Notre Dame side, along with Lindy's lunch bar.

Throughout the years, the upper office floors were occupied by "Lindsay Life Insurance", Sun Life, London Life Insurance, Metropolitan Life, as well as other insurance companies, along with lawyers' offices and professional offices. The building also housed the Wartime Bureau of Personnel, the Veteran's Welfare Division and the Dominion Treasury Office.

The building is currently primarily used as rental apartments.
