= HM Prison Highpoint North =

Prison in Stradishall in Suffolk, England

Coordinates: 52.1406°N 0.5132°E

HMP Highpoint North
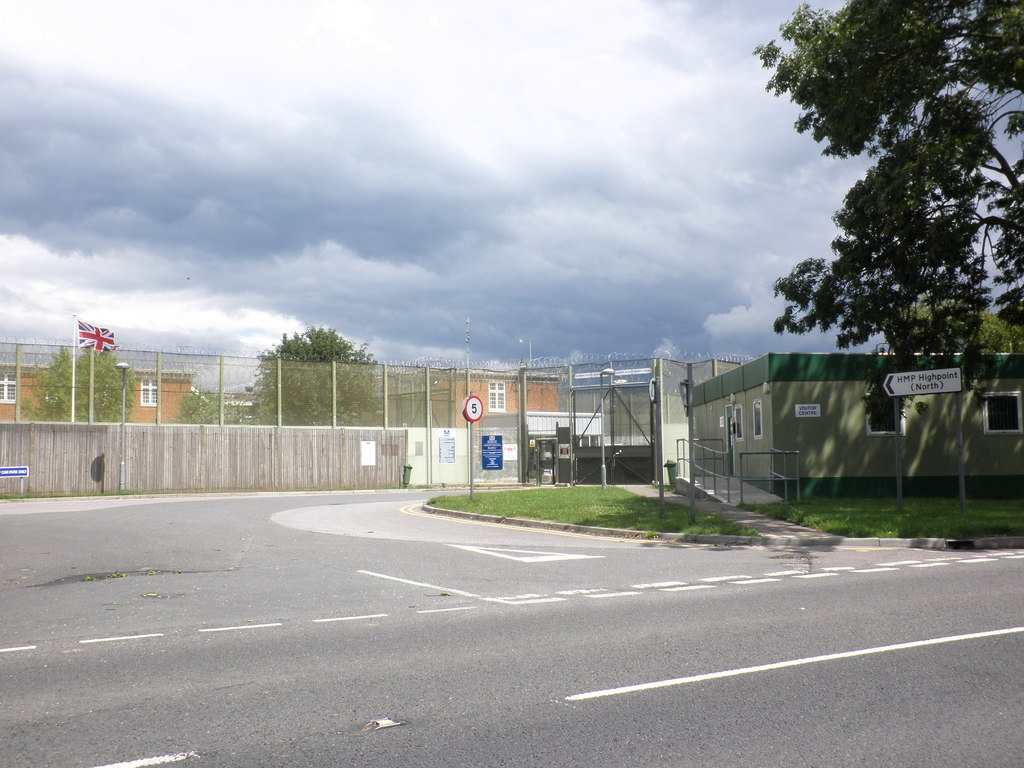
- Main entrance to HMP Highpoint (North)
- Interactive map of HMP Highpoint North
- Location: Stradishall, Suffolk
- Security class: Adult Male/Category C
- Population: 379 (April 2009)
- Opened: 2003 (1977)
- Managed by: HM Prison Services
- Governor: Nigel Smith
- Website: Highpoint North at justice.gov.uk

HM Prison Highpoint North (formerly called Highpoint Prison and Edmunds Hill Prison) is a Category C men's prison, located in the village of Stradishall (near Haverhill) in Suffolk, England. The prison is operated by His Majesty's Prison Service.

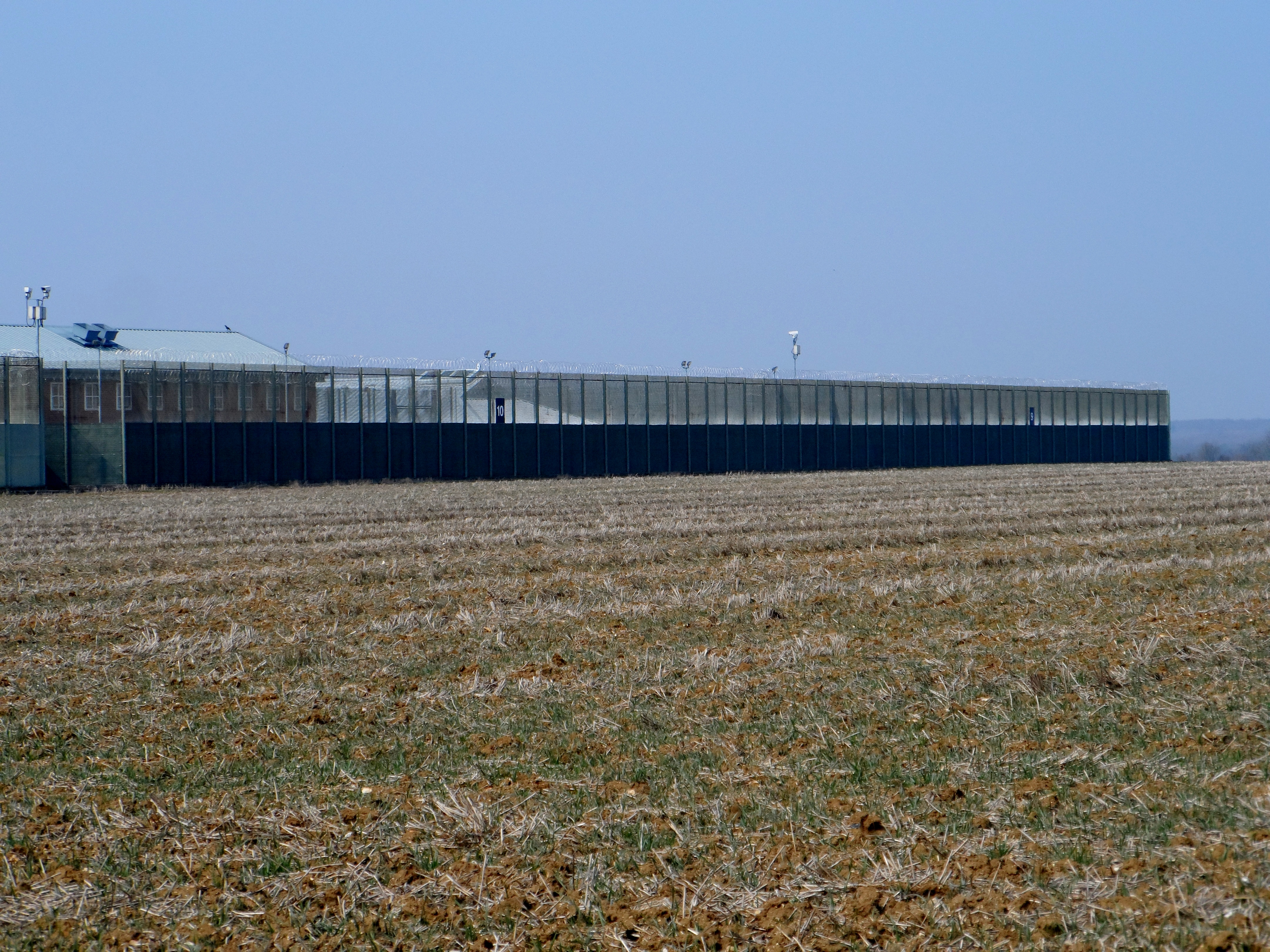
Perimeter fence of Highpoint (North) prison

== History ==
The site of Highpoint North Prison opened in 1938 as an RAF base. On its closure in 1970, the RAF base was briefly converted into a transit camp for Ugandan refugees.

The prison opened in 1977 as Highpoint Prison. In 1997, the North part of Highpoint became a women's prison. On 3 October 2003, two years after the July 2001 separation of the North and South prisons, the North prison became HMP Edmunds Hill. The prison was then converted into a Category C Male establishment in January 2005.

Moors Murderer Myra Hindley had been imprisoned there for almost five years before she died in West Suffolk Hospital on 15 November 2002, having been hospitalised as a result of a heart attack at Highpoint.

In October 2006, 10 inmates rioted at the prison, damaging toilets and shower facilities. The riot started after the inmates were caught with home brew. Another home brew was involved in riots that occurred less than a year later, when inmates crafted a liquor from Marmite and fruit juice.

In May 2007 a report from the Independent Monitoring Board criticised the prison for the neglect of foreign nationals and the treatment of mentally ill offenders at the prison. The report also raised concern that the prison had lacked a Muslim chaplain for two years.

The prison was renamed Highpoint North prison in 2011.

== The prison today ==
The Category C men's prison has an education department, and work opportunities for inmates in Data Input, Contract Cleaning, Gardens/Horticulture, and Catering. Other facilities include a gym and prison chaplaincy. The prison complex consists of six buildings. Three of these are residential treatment units which combine to house 160 men. The remaining three house 67 men each.

There is also a Prison Visitor Centre which is operated by the Ormiston Children and Families Trust.

== Notable former inmates ==
- Boy George
- Myra Hindley
- Ali Dizaei
- Linda Calvey
