= List of British spies =

The following is a list of people engaged in spying for the UK.

== Pre-WWI ==
- Pierre Alamire
- John André
- Benedict Arnold
- Edward Bancroft
- Rachel Charlotte Biggs
- Arthur Conolly
- John Croft
- Andrew Dalgleish
- Sarat Chandra Das
- John Henry
- John Howe
- William Melville
- Balaji Pant Natu
- William Playfair
- Charles Carroll Tevis
- Bernard Frederick Trench
- William Wickham
- Richard Francis Burton
- Charles Hamilton Smith

== World War I ==
- Aaron Aaronsohn
- Sarah Aaronsohn
- Gertrude Bell
- Louise de Bettignies
- Joseph W. Boyle
- R. H. Bruce Lockhart
- Cecil Aylmer Cameron
- Marthe Cnockaert
- Claude Dansey
- Paul Dukes
- Avshalom Feinberg
- Gerard H. L. Fitzwilliams
- Herambalal Gupta
- George Alexander Hill
- Vernon Kell
- Vincent Kraft
- Henry Landau
- Gerard Leachman
- René Lefebvre
- Yosef Lishansky
- W. Somerset Maugham
- William Melville
- Robert Nathan
- Nili
- Conrad O'Brien-ffrench
- Oren
- Gabrielle Petit
- St John Philby
- Oswald Rayner
- Hugh Sinclair
- Kirpal Singh
- Mansfield Smith-Cumming
- Bertrand Stewart
- Basil Thomson

== Interwar period ==
- Christopher Draper
- Peter Ashmun Ames
- John Wheeler-Bennett

== World War II ==
- Carl Aschan
- Sverre Bergh
- Margery Booth
- John Brown
- Odette Marie Celine (Lise)
- Gösta Caroli
- Eddie Chapman
- Noor Inayat Khan
- Brian Cleeve
- Roman Czerniawski
- Roald Dahl
- Claude Dansey
- Wilfred Dunderdale
- Ian Fleming
- Gordon Fraser
- Graham Greene
- George Alexander Hill
- Ralph Izzard
- Johnny Jebsen
- Ron Jeffery
- Ginette Jullian
- Dagmar Lahlum
- George Langelaan
- René Lefebvre
- Charles Letts
- Peter Lunn
- Juan March Ordinas
- Ferdy Mayne
- Stewart Menzies
- Merlin Minshall
- Graham Russell Mitchell
- Mutt and Jeff
- Arthur Owens
- Kim Philby
- Dušan Popov
- Juan Pujol García
- Paddy Ridsdale
- Roland Rieul
- Eric Roberts
- William de Ropp
- Vera von Schalburg
- Wulf Schmidt
- Nathalie Sergueiew
- Peter Smithers
- Halina Szymańska
- Amy Elizabeth Thorpe
- Ted Tinling
- Jona von Ustinov
- Marie-José Villiers
- Valentine Vivian
- Edward Wharton-Tigar
- Archduke Wilhelm of Austria
- Alexander Wilson

== Post WWII ==
- Mark Allen
- Paddy Ashdown
- Denis Donaldson
- Kevin Fulton
- Peter Lunn
- Oleg Lyalin
- Howard Marks
- Martin McGartland
- Omar Nasiri
- Michael Oatley
- Sergei Skripal
- Stakeknife
- Richard Tomlinson
- Sydney Wignall

== See also ==
- History of espionage
