= Ronnie Reed =

British MI5 intelligence operative

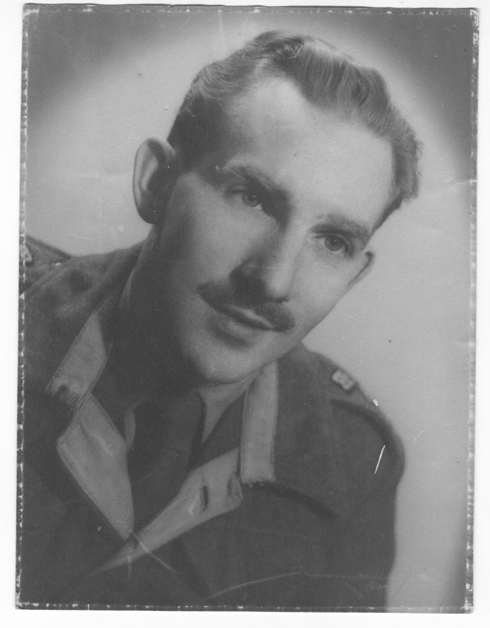
Ronnie Reed in uniform, 1945

Ronald Thomas Reed (8 October 1916 – 22 January 1995) was a BBC radio engineer who became an MI5 officer in 1940, and ran double agents during World War II.

== Background ==
Reed was born in St Pancras, London. His father had been Second Head Waiter at the London Trocadero Restaurant before the First World War but was killed by a stray shell shortly after his arrival in France in 1917 when his son was less than a year old. Reed grew up with his mother Theresa at 9 Leigh Street in the Kings Cross area of London, and was a choirboy at St Pancras Church, close to St Pancras Station. Early on he was interested in radio, and built himself an early form of citizen's band radio. He attended Thanet Street Junior School in St Pancras, and from there gained a scholarship to the Regent Street Polytechnic, where he qualified as an electronic engineer. At around that time he also built himself an early form of TV, called a Baird Televisor. In 1938, he was taken on as a peripatetic engineer for the BBC, and helped on many outside broadcasts.

=== The Second World War ===
In 1940, Ronnie Reed was requested by the BBC to go on an assignment, which turned out to be a visit to Wormwood Scrubs prison, which is where MI5 had its headquarters at the beginning of the Second World War. He was taken to a cell in which there was a German spy who had just landed. This was Agent Summer, a Swedish citizen whose real name was Gösta Caroli. His interrogators wanted Reed to help supervise this agent's first broadcast back to Germany, in which he would tell them he had landed safely. Reed then supervised other double agents, such as Agent Snow (real name Arthur Owens), Agent Celery (real name Walter Dicketts), Agent Tate (real name Wulf Schmidt), during the rest of the War. He was permanently seconded to MI5, which deals with countering subversion. He was Case Officer for a number of agents, of whom the most important was Agent Zigzag (real name Eddie Chapman), whom he supervised from December 1942 until August 1944.

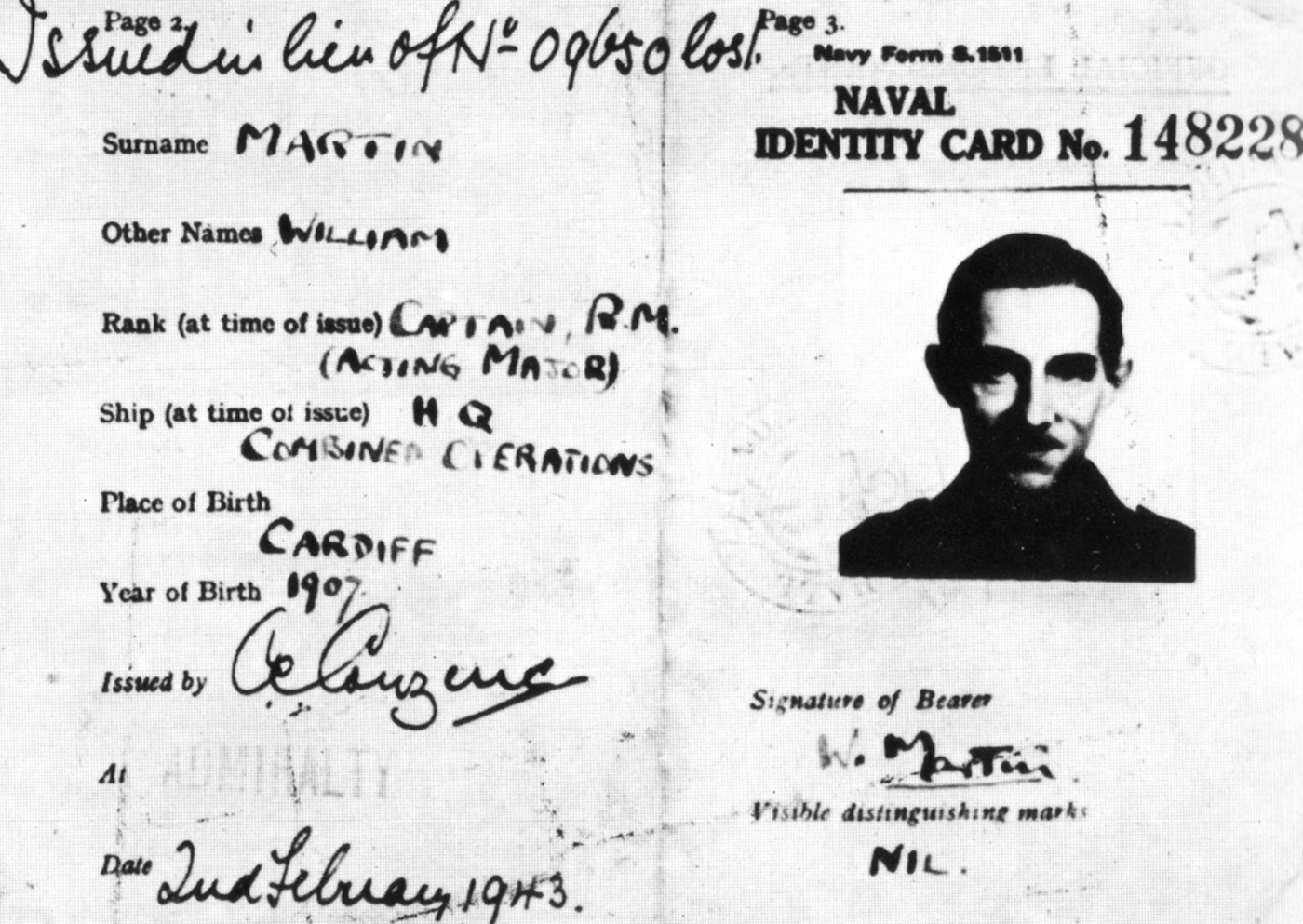
1943 photograph of Ronnie Reed as used in the naval identity card of "Major William Martin"

Reed is also associated with Operation Mincemeat. Commander Ewen Montagu, who thought up the scheme, needed to produce an identity card for the corpse on which fake invasion plans were to be planted. For the card, he needed a photograph, but he could find no-one who resembled the body. Then, at a meeting to discuss double agents, he found himself seated opposite Ronnie Reed and realised that "he could have been the twin brother of the corpse". Reed's photograph was therefore used for the Identity Card.

=== After the Second World War ===
During World War II, Ronnie Reed had met Mary Dyer through the Common Wealth Party – a radical alternative political party, at a time when all the main parties had joined the Coalition Government. They married in June 1946, and had two sons, Nicholas in 1947 and Adrian in 1949. By the early 1950s Reed was a senior officer in MI5, and indeed was the officer to whom William Skardon, Scotland Yard's top interrogator, reported, when Skardon was questioning, and extracting a confession from, the atomic spy Klaus Fuchs. By then, Reed was in charge of the section which dealt with Russian spies, and thus was intimately involved in the investigation of those who spied for the Soviet Union; in particular, Kim Philby, Guy Burgess and Donald Maclean. Reed, like all his fellow officers, had been completely hoodwinked by Philby, and as a result he might have been demoted or moved. However, he did spot that Jenifer Hart, wife of Professor H. L. A. Hart (who had worked at Bletchley Park), might in fact be spying for Soviet Union.

In 1957, Ronnie Reed was seconded to the Foreign Office when he, and his wife and sons, went to New Zealand for a three-year posting. Officially First Secretary at the British High Commission, he was actually helping a New Zealander, Bill Gilbert, to set up a New Zealand MI5, rather than such investigations being run from England in the colonial fashion. In 1960 they returned to the UK and bought a house at 2 Court Lane Gardens, Dulwich, south London. Reed retired in 1976, at the age of 60, and died in 1995 in Dulwich.

Reed contributed a monograph on radio work during World War II; it was published as an appendix to the Official history of British Intelligence during the War.

== Bibliography ==
- Nicholas Reed (2011). My Father, The Man Who Never Was: Ronnie Reed, The Life and Times of an MI5 Officer. Folkestone: Lilburne Press. ISBN 978-1-901167-21-4.
- Ben Macintyre (2007). Agent Zigzag: The True Wartime Story of Eddie Chapman, Lover, Betrayer, Hero, Spy. London: Bloomsbury. ISBN 978-0-7475-8794-1.
- Nicholas Booth (2007). ZigZag: The Incredible Wartime Exploits of Double Agent Eddie Chapman. Piatkus. ISBN 978-0-7499-5154-2.
- Ben Macintyre (2010). Operation Mincemeat. Bloomsbury. ISBN 978-0-7475-9868-8.
- Nigel West, uncredited (2 February 1995). "Obituary: Ronald Reed". The Daily Telegraph.
- Francis Harry Hinsley; et al. (1990). "Appendix 3". British Intelligence in the Second World War. Vol. 4. HMSO. pp. 309–313. ISBN 0-11-630952-0. See The Faber Book of Espionage, 1993, pp 206–210, where Nigel West identifies the Appendix above as written by Reed, and contributes a detailed introduction.
- Nigel West; Madoc Roberts (2011). Snow: The Double Life of a World War Two Spy. Biteback. ISBN 978-1-84954-093-3.
- Carolinda Witt (2017). Double Agent Celery MI5's Crooked Hero. Pen & Sword. ISBN 978-1-5267-1614-9.
