= Faked sabotage of De Havilland Factory =

British deception operation of World War II

- Operational scope: Tactical deception
- Location: Hatfield, England
- Planned: Late 1942 - Early 1943
- Planned by: Eddie Chapman; MI5; Jasper Maskelyne
- Target: Abwehr
- Date: January 29–30, 1943
- Executed by: Military Intelligence, Section 5 (MI5); Eddie Chapman; Jasper Maskelyne
- Outcome: Successful

The faked sabotage at De Havilland Factory was a successful British deception operation of the Second World War at the De Havilland Mosquito aircraft factory in Hatfield, England. The fake sabotage was conducted during the night of January 29–30, 1943 and was designed to fool German reconnaissance aircraft into believing that a large bomb had detonated inside the factory's power plant. With the help of Jasper Maskelyne, a professional magician, and a team of camouflage experts, replica sub-transformers were created out of wood and papier-mâché, buildings were camouflaged, and debris was littered around the plant to create the appearance from the air that it was damaged by an explosion. Eddie Chapman, a British double agent, was used to inform the Abwehr of the success of the "attack", which is what his German handlers sent him to England to do. The ruse proved successful in fooling the Abwehr, and Chapman was even awarded the Iron Cross as a reward for his work.

== Background ==
In prison at the time of the German occupation of the Channel Islands, Eddie Chapman concocted a plan to get off the island by notifying German officials of his willingness to become a spy. After transferring him to Fort de Romainville in Paris, Captain Stephan von Gröning, the head of Abwehr in Nantes, trained Chapman in espionage activities such as radio communications, explosives, and parachute jumping. Following his training, Chapman was dispatched to Britain to sabotage the De Havilland factory in Hatfield, which was manufacturing the Mosquito bomber aircraft. Shortly after landing off target near Littleport, Cambridgeshire, Chapman turned himself in to local police and offered to work for MI5, who decided to use him as a double agent.

In order to maintain the German handler's faith in Chapman, MI5 officials decided to fake the sabotage operation he came to Britain to conduct. Most importantly, they believed it needed to be widely reported throughout the media, including the Times—the British news source Stephan von Gröning followed. With the help of the Hatfield factory owner, who was made aware of the plot, Chapman traveled to the De Havilland plant and surveyed the site as if he was actually going to conduct the sabotage. After all, he would be interrogated upon his return to the Abwehr and must have a solid, consistent story of how he accomplished his mission.

Upon analyzing the site, Chapman developed his "plan". After climbing a small barbed wire fence, he would place one suitcase, containing thirty pounds of explosives, near four transformers housed within a walled yard. Another suitcase would be placed in what German reconnaissance incorrectly identified as a subsidiary powerhouse but was really an old facility used for a swimming pool no longer in use. By priming the fuses on a one-hour delay, Chapman would be able to escape in time and deal a devastating blow to the factory. Realizing that it would be nearly impossible for one man to carry sixty pounds of explosives in two suitcases over a fence, he determined that he would need an "accomplice". Before leaving for Britain, Abwehr officials told Chapman he could use members of his former "Jelly Gang", his small pre-war criminal group, as accomplices if needed. Therefore, Chapman would notionally seek the help of the former leader of the Jelly Gang, Jimmy Hunt, who was actually still in prison. In order to convince the Germans he was able to create the bombs, Chapman also went around to various stores to test whether it was possible to obtain all the ingredients necessary. Even with wartime rationing, he found it surprisingly easy to do this.

=== Significance of the De Havilland factory ===
For both military and political reasons, the Abwehr had designated the De Havilland factory as a target for sabotage operations in 1942. The Mosquito aircraft was designed at this factory north of London, and production began in 1940. The Nazis found the quick, versatile aircraft difficult to deal with, as it was capable of making trips to Berlin with 4,000 pounds (1,814kg) of bombs and had a maximum speed of 400 mph. The two-man crew planes were built almost entirely of wood and were able to be cheaply assembled by carpenters and cabinetmakers. Nicknamed "the Wooden Wonder", the aircraft was mainly used for target bombing missions because it was so light and was able to deliver bombs accurately. During the war, Mosquito bombers were responsible for the attacks on Gestapo headquarters in Norway and Denmark and the Amiens jail in German-occupied France.

The head of the Luftwaffe, Reichsmarschall Hermann Göring, was particularly envious of the British Mosquito:

It makes me furious when I see the Mosquito. I turn green and yellow with envy. The British, who can afford aluminum better than we can, knock together a beautiful wooden aircraft that every piano factory over there is building, and they give it a speed which they have now increased yet again. What do you make of that? They have the geniuses and we have the nincompoops! After the war is over, I'm going to buy a British radio set – then at least I'll own something that has always worked!

With the Nazis failing to effectively handle the Mosquito threat, they devised the plan to sabotage the De Havilland factory manufacturing them. If the production could be stopped, they thought, it could tip the scale of the air war in their favour. For Chapman's handler Stephan von Gröning, the sabotage would demonstrate the skills of his newest spy and boost the reputation of the Abwehr as a whole. If the De Havilland factory proved to be too challenging of a mission for Chapman, contingency plans included attacking refineries of sugar and rubber, an aircraft propeller factory south west of London, or simply leaving bombs in lockers at Tube stations.

== Preparation and execution of fake sabotage ==
=== Camouflaging the factory ===
Understanding that convincing the Germans that the sabotage at the De Havilland factory actually occurred would be a difficult task, the British sought the help of a professional magician, Jasper Maskelyne, and a team of camouflage experts. For this task, the British told them to make it "look, from the air, as if the place had been blown to Kingdom Come". Initial plans called for placing asbestos sheets on the roof of the factory and then starting a fire, but this option was rejected on account of concerns that the Luftwaffe would see the burning factory and may try to bomb it. Instead, the British decided to create a "veil of camouflage" that would make it look, from both the air and the ground, as if the factory power plant was blown up by a large bomb. Four replica sub-transformers were created using wood and papier-mâché, and two of them were rolled over as if they had been blown sideways by the explosion of the bomb. The real transformers were disguised, "with netting and corrugated iron sheets", to create the appearance from the air that it was really just a large hole in the ground. On the night of January 29–30, the green wooden gates to the building that housed the transformers was replaced with green wooden gates that were damaged. The smaller building was covered by tarps that were painted to look like a half-demolished brick wall. Other walls of buildings were covered in soot as if the explosion blackened them, and debris was spread around the factory within a radius of 100 feet.

The night to conduct the fake sabotage was decided, by military meteorologists, to be January 29–30 due to the long hours of darkness and lack of cloud cover. Since the moon was not expected to rise until 2:30AM, the British would have several hours of darkness to deploy their camouflage veil on the factory, and the lack of cloud cover would ensure the Germans could see the aftermath of the "explosion".

=== Importance of the press ===
While creating a scene that the factory had exploded was vital to the operation, another vital aspect was that news sources in Britain published stories about the incident. Since Stephan von Gröning followed The Times looking for messages from Chapman, they decided that planting a false story in it of the sabotage would be most effective. However, the editor of The Times, Robert Barrington-Ward, refused to publish the story. Placing a story in his paper that he knew was not true, he said, went against his entire policy.

With their first option being denied, MI5 decided to approach the Daily Express next. The editor, Arthur Christiansen, also noted that publishing a fake story was against his policy, but regardless decided to oblige. However, wartime censorship prevented newspapers from publishing anything that was likely to "encourage the enemy", and this certainly fitted that category. Knowing that censors would call him and force him to remove it as soon as they saw the story, Christiansen decided to make a compromise with MI5 officials. He would publish the false account in the earliest edition of his paper that was sent to Lisbon, where the paper was distributed to German officials in Germany and across its occupied territories. The British concluded that even if the Germans realised the story was only published in the first edition, they would believe it was taken out in later print runs by the censors. Chapman notified his German handlers of the impending "sabotage", and the RAF Fighter Command was instructed to look for reconnaissance planes in the Hatfield vicinity but to in no circumstance engage them. If factory employees inquired about the camouflage, the owner of the factory was prepared to say it was a test "to see if high-altitude photography can pick up minor damage". In the event members of the press showed up, they were to be informed that "something had occurred, but very small and not worthwhile reporting." With all of this in place, MI5 officials believed rumours would begin to circulate about the alleged incident.

On the night of January 29–30, the camouflage experts moved to the De Havilland factory and set up their ruse. Looking at the scene, MI5 officials were convinced that their plot would fool the Germans, despite the fact that there was thicker cloud cover than expected. Ronnie Reed, an MI5 officer responsible supervising Chapman, commented that "The whole picture was very convincing" and that "aerial photography from any height above 2,000 feet would show considerable devastation without creating any suspicion".

Following the operation, Chapman delivered a wireless message to Stephan von Gröning, who replied with a congratulations for completing the operation successfully. Upon his return to the Abwehr, Chapman was heavily interrogated but continued to fool the Germans that the sabotage actually took place. He was rewarded with 100,000 Reichsmarks for his work in England, and in recognition for his "outstanding zeal and success", Stephan von Gröning presented Chapman with an Iron Cross. He remains the first and only British citizen to ever receive the medal.
