= Josef Jakobs =

German spy (1898–1941)

- Jakobs in c. 1941
- Born: 30 June 1898; Luxembourg
- Died: 15 August 1941 (aged 43); London, England
- Burial place: St Mary's Catholic Cemetery, Kensal Green, London
- Occupation: Spy
- Known for: Last person executed in the Tower of London
- Criminal charge: Treachery
- Criminal penalty: Death
- Criminal status: Executed by firing squad
- Espionage activity
- Allegiance: Nazi Germany
- Agency: Abwehr
- Service years: 1940–1941
- Rank: Feldwebel

Josef Jakobs (30 June 1898 – 15 August 1941) was a German spy and the last person to be executed at the Tower of London. He was captured shortly after parachuting into the United Kingdom during the Second World War. Convicted of espionage under the Treachery Act 1940, Jakobs was sentenced to death and shot by a military firing squad. He was not hanged since he was captured as an enemy combatant.

== Early life ==
Jakobs, who was a German citizen, was born in Luxembourg in 1898. During the First World War, he served in the German infantry, rising to the rank of Leutnant, in the 4th Foot Guards. In June 1940, ten months after the outbreak of the Second World War, Jakobs was drafted into the Wehrmacht as an Oberleutnant. However, when it was discovered that he had been imprisoned in Switzerland from 1934 to 1937 for selling counterfeit gold, he was forced to resign his commission in the Wehrmacht. Jakobs was demoted to a Feldwebel (NCO) and placed in the Meteorologischer Dienst (meteorological service) of the German Army. Shortly afterwards, he also began working for the Abwehr, the intelligence department of the German Army.

== Capture and interrogation ==
On 31 January 1941, Jakobs was flown from Schiphol Airport in the Netherlands to Ramsey in Huntingdonshire. He parachuted from the aircraft and landed in a field near Dove House Farm, but broke his ankle during the process. The following morning, Jakobs attracted the attention of two farmers, Charles Baldock and Harry Coulson, by firing his pistol into the air. Baldock and Coulson notified members of the local Home Guard, who quickly apprehended Jakobs. He was caught still wearing his flying suit and carrying £500 in British currency, forged identity papers, a radio transmitter and a German sausage.

On his person was also found a photo purportedly of his lover, a German cabaret singer and actress named Clara Bauerle (1905–1942), who became a spy because she had spent a few years performing in the West Midlands and could speak English with a Birmingham accent. Jakobs said Bauerle was meant to join him after he had made "radio contact", but then doubted she would now be sent since he was arrested before he could communicate with his team. Bauerle's whereabouts remained unknown for several decades, and it was conjectured that she may have died under suspicious circumstances in England, though the corpse found inside a hollow tree was a foot shorter than Bauerle. In 2016, it was discovered that Bauerle had died in a Berlin hospital on 16 December 1942.

Jakobs was taken to Ramsey Police Station before being transferred to Cannon Row Police Station in London, where he gave a voluntary statement to Major T. A. Robertson of MI5. Due to the poor condition of his ankle, Jakobs was transferred to Brixton Prison Infirmary for the night. The following day he was briefly interrogated by Lieutenant Colonel Stephens of MI5 at Camp 020 before being transferred to Dulwich Hospital where he remained for the next two months.

== Military trial and execution ==
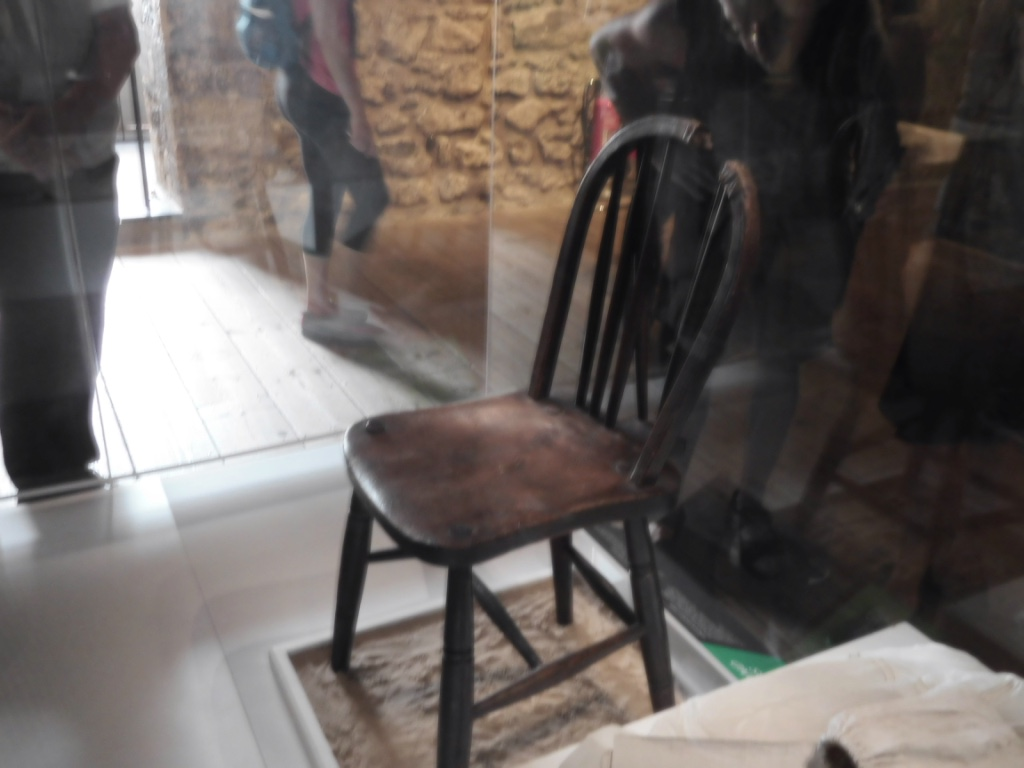
The Windsor chair that Josef Jakobs sat on when executed by firing squad at the Tower of London on 15 August 1941

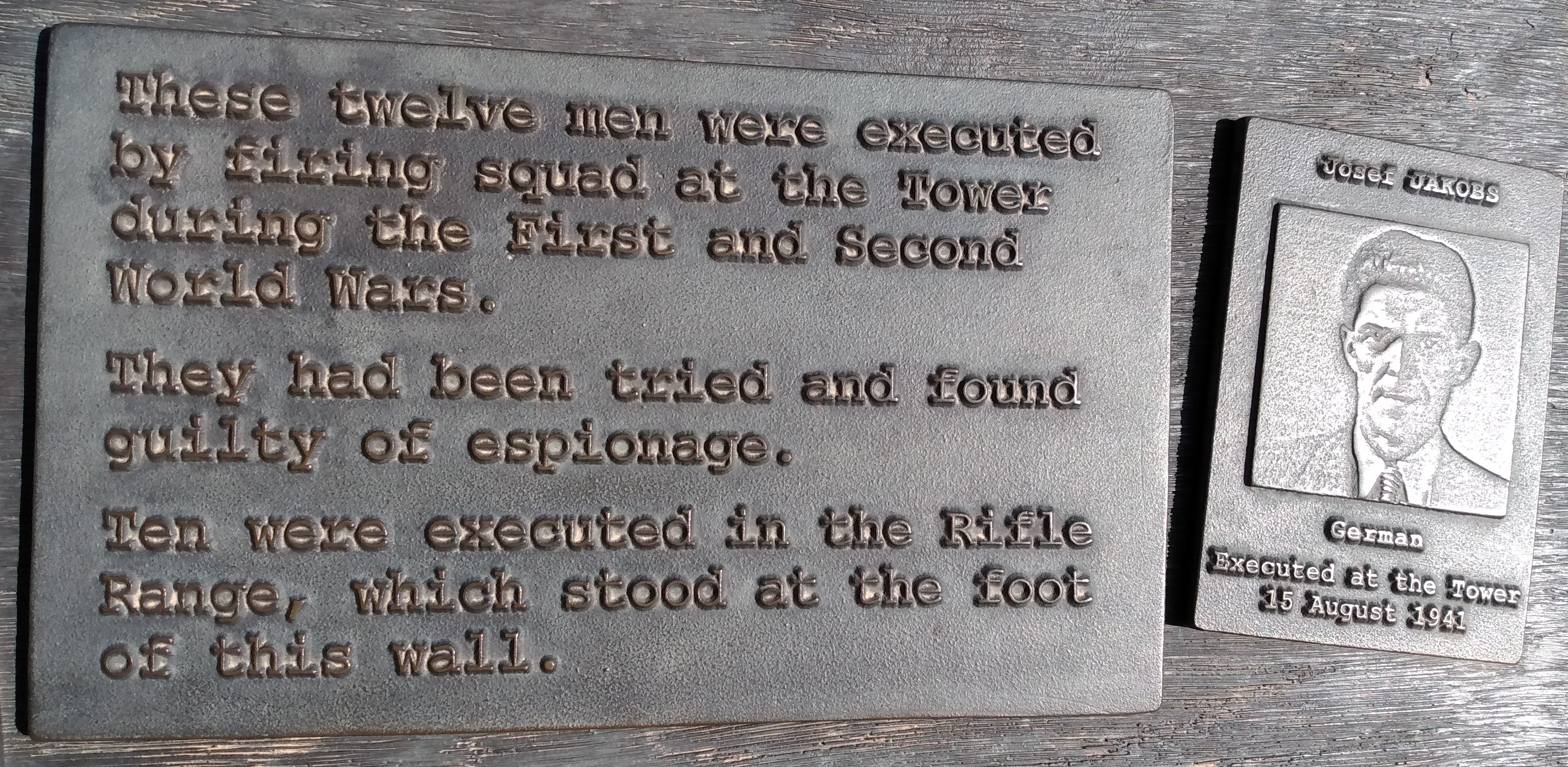
A plaque at the Tower of London concerning the execution of Josef Jakobs

Jakobs's court martial took place in front of a military tribunal at the Duke of York's Headquarters in Chelsea, London SW3, on 4–5 August 1941. The trial was held in camera because the German agent had been apprehended in a highly classified intelligence operation known as the Double Cross System. The British were aware that Jakobs was coming because his arrival information had been passed on to MI5 by the Welsh nationalist and Abwehr double agent Arthur Owens. After a two-day trial which involved hearing the testimony of eight witnesses, Jakobs was found guilty of spying and sentenced to death.

Jakobs's execution took place at the miniature rifle range in the grounds of the Tower of London on 15 August 1941. He was tied and blindfolded in a brown Windsor chair. Eight soldiers from the Holding battalion of the Scots Guards, armed with .303 Lee–Enfields, took aim at a white cotton target, about matchbook size, pinned over Jakobs's heart. The squad fired in unison at 7:12 a.m. after being given a silent signal from Lieutenant-Colonel C.R. Gerard (Deputy Provost Marshal for London District). Jakobs died instantly. A postmortem examination found that one bullet had hit Jakobs in the heart and the other four had been on or around the marked target area. As three members of the eight-man firing squad had been issued with blanks, only five live rounds were used. He was the last person to be executed at the Tower of London.

Following the execution, Jakobs's body was buried in an unmarked grave at St Mary's Catholic Cemetery, Kensal Green, London. The location used for Jakobs's grave has since been re-used, so the original grave site is difficult to find.
