= Walter Dicketts =

British double agent

- Born: 31 March 1900; Southend-on-Sea
- Died: 16 August 1957 (aged 57); Paddington, London
- Cause of death: Suicide
- Occupations: Import/Exporter, businessman, confidence trickster, intelligence officer
- Spouses: Phyllis Hobson (m. 1918; div. 1924) 1st mistress, Dora Viva Guerrier (1919–1922) Alma Wood (m. 1929; div. 1931) Vera Fudge (m. 1933; div. 1942) 2nd mistress, Kathleen Mary Holdcroft (1939–1942) Judith Kelman (m. 1943; div. 1957)
- Children: 6
- Parent(s): Arthur Skinner Dicketts, Francis Dicketts née Cromarty
- Espionage activity
- Allegiance: United Kingdom
- Service branch: MI5, MI6, Abwehr
- Service years: 1918–1919 and 1940–1943
- Codename: Celery
- Operations: World War I and World War II

Walter Arthur Charles Dicketts (31 March 1900 – 16 August 1957) was a British double agent who was sent by MI5 into Nazi Germany in early 1941 to infiltrate the Abwehr and bring back information about any impending invasion of Britain.

Before his two years as a double agent, he was an RNAS officer who had worked in Air Intelligence during the latter part of World War I and had served several prison sentences for fraud. As he was unable to regain a commission in the RAF or work for British Intelligence due to his criminal past, Dicketts volunteered to work for the British Double Cross team.

== Early life ==
Walter Dicketts was born in Southend-on-Sea, the son of Arthur, a stockbroker's clerk, and his wife Francis. Dicketts attended the local grammar school and in 1915 he ran away from school and enlisted with the RNAS at the age of fifteen. He served in armoured cars, and tanks before becoming a pilot in 1917. After a crash in which he was badly injured he became an intelligence officer with the Air Ministry with the rank of captain.

In 1919, he married Phyllis Hobson, the daughter of a wealthy silver cutlery manufacturer, with whom he had a son called Graeme in 1919. During the early part of their marriage Dicketts met Dora Viva Guerrier, a dancer with the famous Tiller Girls, and began a relationship, resulting in the birth of Dicketts' only daughter, Effie. The following year he had a second son by Phyllis and several months later a son to Dora, who was given away at birth. Unable to meet his expenses, Dicketts turned to crime, purchasing goods with false cheques and then selling the items. He was sentenced to hard labour and as a result lost both his wife and his mistress.

At the age of thirty, Dicketts eloped with a sixteen-year-old girl named Alma Wood and married her, prompting a nationwide search to catch him before the marriage could take place.

He married two more times to Vera Fudge and Judith Kelman and maintained a second mistress called Kathleen "Kay" Holdcroft during his marriage to Vera. Kay "Dicketts" played an integral role as part of his cover during his mission to South America in 1941. Dicketts was the father of six children.

== Work with MI5 ==
Dicketts was sent by MI5 into Nazi Germany in early 1941 to infiltrate the Abwehr and bring back information about any impending invasion of Britain. As part of the Double-Cross System Dicketts role was to convince the Germans he was a traitor who was willing to sell out his country in return for cash, whilst continuing to report to MI5.

He was also an ex RNAS officer who had worked in Air Intelligence for the Air Ministry during the latter part of World War I and had subsequently served several prison sentences for fraud. Unable to regain a commission in the RAF or work for British Intelligence due to his criminal past, Dicketts volunteered to work for the British Double Cross team led by Lt.Col T.A. Robertson (Thomas Argyle Robertson, known as Tar by his initials).

Given the codename Celery, Dicketts accompanied Britain's first double agent Arthur Owens (Snow) to neutral Lisbon where he was introduced to Major Nikolaus Ritter of the Abwehr. Ritter arranged for Dicketts to be brought to Hamburg to be interrogated by members of the Abwehr. Dicketts was drugged, plied with alcohol, tricked and strenuously interrogated for five days and was accepted as a German agent whose role was to ferry German spies and equipment into England by boat from the occupied Channel Islands. Dicketts remained in Hamburg and later in Berlin for four weeks.

When Dicketts returned to England with Owens their stories did not match and MI5 spent many hours interrogating their two agents, trying to establish who was telling the truth. In the end Dicketts' account was believed over Owens', who was imprisoned until 1944 for betraying Dicketts to the Germans before he even went into Germany, and for informing Ritter that the radio transmitter he had given him before the war, was now under MI5 control. MI5 were never certain of Owens' loyalty, or if he betrayed Dicketts due to jealousy or whether he was a genuine traitor. If the latter was the case, then Owens may have continued to betray other British agents or disclosed secret details about deceptions of vital importance to Britain.

Shortly after Owens' imprisonment, MI5 sent Dicketts back to Lisbon to help an Abwehr officer to defect, and several months later he was sent to South America shortly before the Japanese bombed Pearl Harbor. Dicketts' mistress Kay was given false papers in the name of Mrs Dicketts despite her "husband" being legally married at the time.

In his business life, Walter Dicketts used up to twenty-three different aliases and served several prison sentences for fraud (forging cheques and obtaining money by false pretences) in the UK, as well as one in Austria and one in France. Dicketts married four times and maintained two mistresses during two of those marriages. Police and media described Dicketts variously as elusive, well educated, well spoken, with charming manners and a charming smile.

== Later life ==
After leaving MI5 in 1943 Dicketts imported oranges into England from South America and became involved in a variety of different businesses, including property development. When his businesses began to fail, Dicketts and his wife Judith fled to East Grinstead, where he established himself as a wealthy philanthropist called Charles Stewart Pollock. He became very successful, owned a manor house, and drove around in a white Rolls-Royce. The money he obtained from investors was used to repay other investors and in classic Ponzi scheme style, his businesses began to collapse and Dicketts was unable to repay his debts and soon gave himself up to police.

Dicketts was sentenced to four years prison of which he served two years for good behaviour and then left England to run a rubber plantation in Malaya.

In October 1957, John Bull magazine published an article called "Hitler's Wartime Spies in Britain" which named Arthur Owens but not Walter Dicketts. Dicketts was described by his German codename Brown, and was pictured being drugged by the Abwehr who removed his opening signet ring to see if any hidden secret code was written behind the photograph of his girlfriend Kay.

Dicketts died in August 1957 of coal-gas poisoning, having apparently killed himself, and Owens died in December of the same year of cardiac asthma, a condition secondary to heart failure that is marked by breathing difficulty.

In 1972 John Cecil Masterman published The Double Cross System in the War of 1939 to 1945, an intimate account of wartime British military deception, in which Celery is mentioned, but not identified as Walter Dicketts. His family did not discover his role with British intelligence in both world wars until his security services file was released by the British National Archives in 2006. It was at this time that his family discovered the existence of his other wives, mistresses and children.

In 2017, his granddaughter Carolinda Witt, published a biography of Dicketts' called Double Agent Celery – MI5's Crooked Hero.

== See also ==
- Double-Cross System
