= Camp 020 =

British interrogation centre during WW2

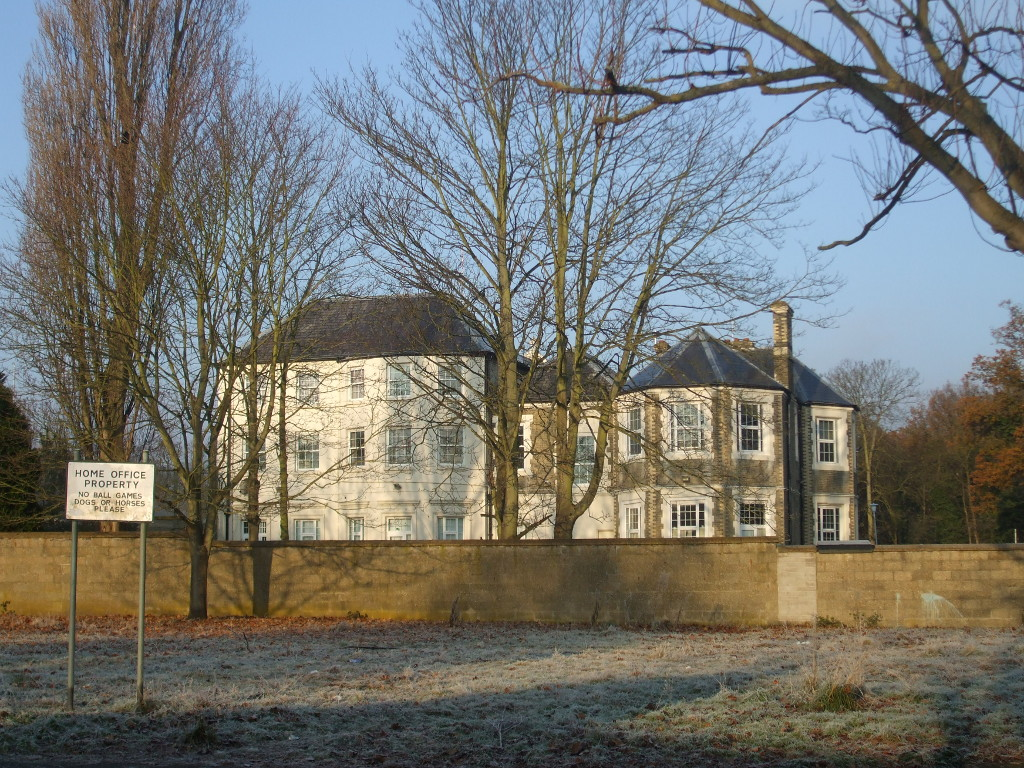
Latchmere House, site of Camp 020

Camp 020 at Latchmere House in Ham, Surrey (now in the London Borough of Richmond upon Thames), was a British interrogation centre for captured German agents during the Second World War. It was run by Lieutenant Colonel Robin "Tin Eye" Stephens. Although other wartime interrogation centres were alleged to have used torture to extract confessions, Stephens denied claims that torture had been used at Camp 020. His instructions for interrogators ordered: “Never strike a man. In the first place it is an act of cowardice. In the second place, it is not intelligent. A prisoner will lie to avoid further punishment and everything he says thereafter will be based on a false premise.”

It is known that Stephens punished those who disobeyed this order, and in one case ejected a senior War Office interrogator from the camp. After the war, Stephens ran another camp in Bad Nenndorf in Germany but was tried for the maltreatment of prisoners, some of whom died. He and two others, medical officer John Smith and interrogator Lieutenant Richard Langham, were tried by British military court of inquiry in Germany. Stephens and Lanham were acquitted. Smith was acquitted of manslaughter but found guilty of lesser charges of neglecting prisoners, and was cashiered.

In 2012, Ian Cobain in the book Cruel Britannia claimed that documents obtained at The National Archives proved that torture methods had been used at Camp 020 to extract information and that thirty rooms there had been turned into cells with hidden microphones, further that there were mock executions and several inmates were treated brutally by the guards. Members of the British Union of Fascists had been held at Latchmere House during this period.

There was a reserve camp, Camp 020R, at Huntercombe, which was used mainly for long term detention of prisoners.

The BBC docudrama Spy! depicted Camp 020 in one episode in 1980. The depiction stirred controversy, as the BBC dramatisation showed the use of physical assault on individuals being interrogated. In 2013, a pair of characters, based on Stephens, also appears in "The Cage", the second episode of series 7 of Foyle's War.

== Inmates ==
Known wartime inmates included:

- James Larratt Battersby
- Hugo Bleicher
- Gösta Caroli
- Eddie Chapman
- Jacques de Duve
- Josef Jakobs
- Werner von Janowski
- Christiaan Lindemans
- Karel Richard Richter
- Wulf Schmidt
- Duncan Scott-Ford
- Gastão de Freitas Ferraz

== See also ==
- Double Cross System
- London Cage
