= Roger Grosjean =

French intelligence agent (1920–1975)

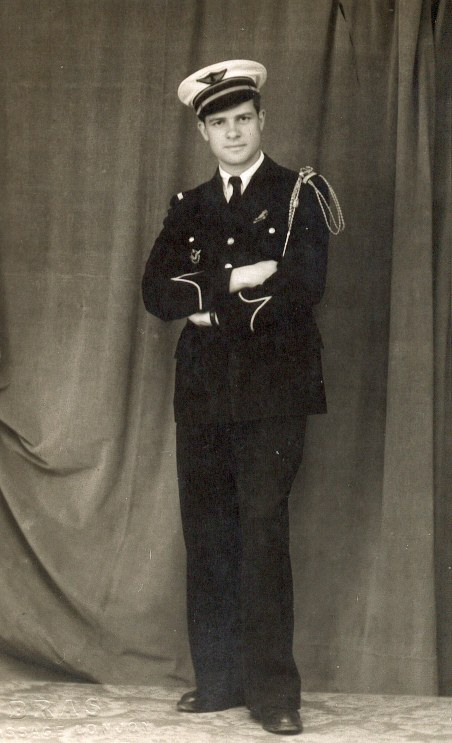
Roger Grosjean, as a French Air Force pilot, c. 1941

Roger Grosjean (25 July 1920 – 7 June 1975) was a French Air Force pilot, a double agent during World War II, and one of the founding fathers of Corsican prehistoric archaeology.

== Early life ==
Grosjean was born in Chalon-sur-Saône, the son of Joseph Grosjean, a judge. As Joseph was posted to different cities, the family lived in Lunéville, Briey, Lille, and Paris. At age 14, Roger was a boarder at the private Catholic school Collège de Marcq en Baroeul where, in 1936, he became the youth French record-holder in the discus throw. In 1939, at age 18, without completing his exams, Grosjean left school to join the French Air Force.

== Military career ==
Grosjean was trained in Clermont-Ferrand and at the Ambérieu-en-Bugey Air Base, graduating second in his class. He was given the rank of Sergeant and, during the Phoney War, became a fighter pilot, based in Étampes, where he flew the Morane-Saulnier M.S.406 and the Dewoitine D.500. In May 1940, his plane was hit by Allied anti-aircraft fire and he was wounded. He was unable to take part in the Battle of France and was elsewhere when German bombers struck the Étampes base, but returned to help dig the graves of his colleagues.

In 1941, Grosjean was posted to the Fighter Group (GC) 2/1 in Le Luc; the group's mission was to protect the French fleet in Toulon. In September 1941, Grosjean's engine malfunctioned and he crashed into the forest at Flassans-sur-Issole. He was seriously injured and unable to return to duty until the spring of 1942, at which time his request to rejoin his group in North Africa was denied and he was deemed unfit to fly. Now a master sergeant, he was accepted at an officer candidate school but his injuries barred him from attending.

== As a double agent ==
In late 1942, what remained of the French military was demobilized. Grosjean was released, decided to go to law school and settled in Paris. According to his personal papers, his memoir, and research conducted by his son François Grosjean, Roger Grosjean was serving Vichy France but was not a collaborator. He publicly spoke against the Germans, considered stealing a German plane and flying to England, and his circle of friends included the French Resistance fighter Marcel Degliame. However, by May 1943, he was socializing with known collaborators. One of them was Georges Montet, whose brother Lucien, a.k.a. Christian Martell, was a resistance fighter and a member of the Alsace fighter group (No. 341 Squadron RAF). Georges Montet, who was likely a double agent, offered to get Grosjean a job as a ferry pilot with Lufthansa. Although how and when they met is unclear, Grosjean wrote that he spoke to a British agent called "Richardson", who was working in Wattignies in northern France. Richardson told Grosjean to take the position.

Grosjean met with Georges Montet at his apartment but there were two other men there, one of whom was a German colonel in civilian clothes introduced as "Pierre". According to the French author Patrice Miannay, this was likely the Abwehr operative Pedro Köpke. "Pierre" offered Grosjean a different job—a German mission to fly to Allied territory, enlist in the Free French Air Forces, gather and submit information on Allied operations, and steal a plane. He would receive significant remuneration if he could deliver a plane with new navigational equipment. Grosjean wrote that "Pierre" assured him that the mission was safe; he also wrote that "Richardson" told him that he would be "protected".

According to a report by the London Reception Centre (LRC), an MI5 interrogation office, on June 5, 1943, Grosjean was transported to Spain. He was kept in a Barcelona safe house, where his new handler gave him a detailed cover story and then took him to the British Consulate. Grosjean applied to be evacuated from Spain and expected to wait for the process to be completed. However, on June 19, the British unexpectedly placed him in the custody of two French Air Force members, who took him on an arduous hike, by train and on foot, to Lisbon. Grosjean wrote that he had been given special ink for writing letters; as he feared for his family's safety if it appeared that he disobeyed Pierre's orders, he wrote to Pierre from Lisbon. However, as all of this was part of the Double-Cross System, it is likely that Pierre knew in advance that this is what would occur.

Grosjean reached England in July 1943 and spent ten days being interrogated at the LRC. He reported all details of his German assignment, providing intricate details such as the license plate numbers of vehicles used by collaborators. He was told that if he worked for Britain, he would correspond with the Germans, with the goal of finding spies in Britain, and of giving the Germans false information about British military movements. If he chose not to work for Britain, he would be offered the position of Air Force instructor. Grosjean agreed to act as a double agent for the Security Service (MI5); he was given the code name FIDO and became one of 40 Double-Cross agents, a group which included Joan Pujol Garcia, Nathalie Sergueiew, Arthur Owens, Roman Czerniawski, Elvira Chaudoir, and Duško Popov.

Grosjean then joined the Free French Air Force, obtaining a position through pre-arrangement by MI5. He was promoted to Lieutenant and given a position in the intelligence service. With the knowledge of MI5, but not the French, he was also writing coded letters to his handler in Barcelona. In January 1944, he was given permission to fly again. By March, the Germans had become aware that he was working for the British and he wrote that he was "condemned to death". Both his British and French colleagues no longer trusted him. His handler wrote that it was "necessary to ensure that he got no access to operational information of any kind and that he was as far away from the zone of operations as possible." He was then posted to North Africa—first Algiers and then Meknes, where he worked as an instructor on P-39s. In case he fell into German hands, he was given the name François Perrin. He was then sent to the Lille Air Base, then to Paris to work at the Air Ministry.

In late 1946, Grosjean completed his military career as a captain in the Air Force Reserves. The French government awarded him the Croix de Guerre and the Legion of Honour. He was also one of a few to receive the Commemorative medal for voluntary service in Free France, and a hand-written note from General Charles de Gaulle reading: "You answered France's call when it was mortally wounded by joining the Free French Forces. You were part of the volunteers-our brave companions-who maintained our country in the war with honor. You were among the first men to lead us to victory. Now that our aim has been achieved, I wish to thank you cordially and simply in the name of France. C. de Gaulle."

== Archaeological career ==
After a transition period, during which he trained as an archeologist and took part in digs with L'Abbé Henri Breuil, the famous French archeologist, he joined the French National Centre for Scientific Research (CNRS). In 1954, he left for Corsica and began what was to be a very successful research career spanning twenty years studying the Corsican megalithic civilization. He uncovered sculpted menhirs at Filitosa, Cauria and Palaghju, for example, as well as megalithic fortified settlements at Alo-Bisucce, Cucuruzzu and Araghju.

In the summer of 1975, at the height of his career, and while working on his new museum in Sartène, Grosjean died of a heart attack. He was fifty-four years old.

An illustrated biography of Grosjean was published in 2011 by his son, François Grosjean, who also wrote an article about him in British Archaeology in 2012. A few years later he wrote a book on his search of his two parents, Roger and Sallie, whom he did not know well as a child.

== Selected publications ==
- Grosjean, R. (1955). Les statues-menhirs de la Corse I. Études corses, 7–8, 5-36.
- Grosjean, R. (1961). Filitosa et son contexte archéologique. Monuments et Mémoires Piot T. 52 - Paris: P.U.F.
- Grosjean, R. (1964). Le complexe torréen fortifié de Cucuruzzu (Levie, Corse). Première campagne de fouilles 1963. Bulletin de la société préhistorique française, LXI, 1, 185–194.
- Grosjean, R. (1966). La Corse avant l'histoire. Paris: Klincksieck.
- Grosjean, R. (1966). Recent work in Corsica. Antiquity, XL, 159, 190–198.
- Grosjean, R. (1967). Le complexe monumental fortifié torréen du Castello d'Araggio (Commune de San-Gavinodi-Garbini. Corse). Bulletin de la société préhistorique française, LXV, 9, cclvj-cclcvij.
- Grosjean, R. (1968). Nouvelles statues-stèles découvertes en Corse. Bulletin de la société préhistorique française, LXV, 8, 195–198.
- Grosjean, R. (1972). Les alignements de Pagliaiu (Sartène, Corse). Bulletin de la société préhistorique française, LXIX, 2, 607- 617.
- Grosjean, R. (1975). Torre et Torréens : Âge du Bronze de l'île de Corse. Collection: Promenades archéologiques, 3. Centre de Préhistoire corse.
