= Nikolaus Ritter =

German military intelligence (Abwehr) officer (1899-1974)

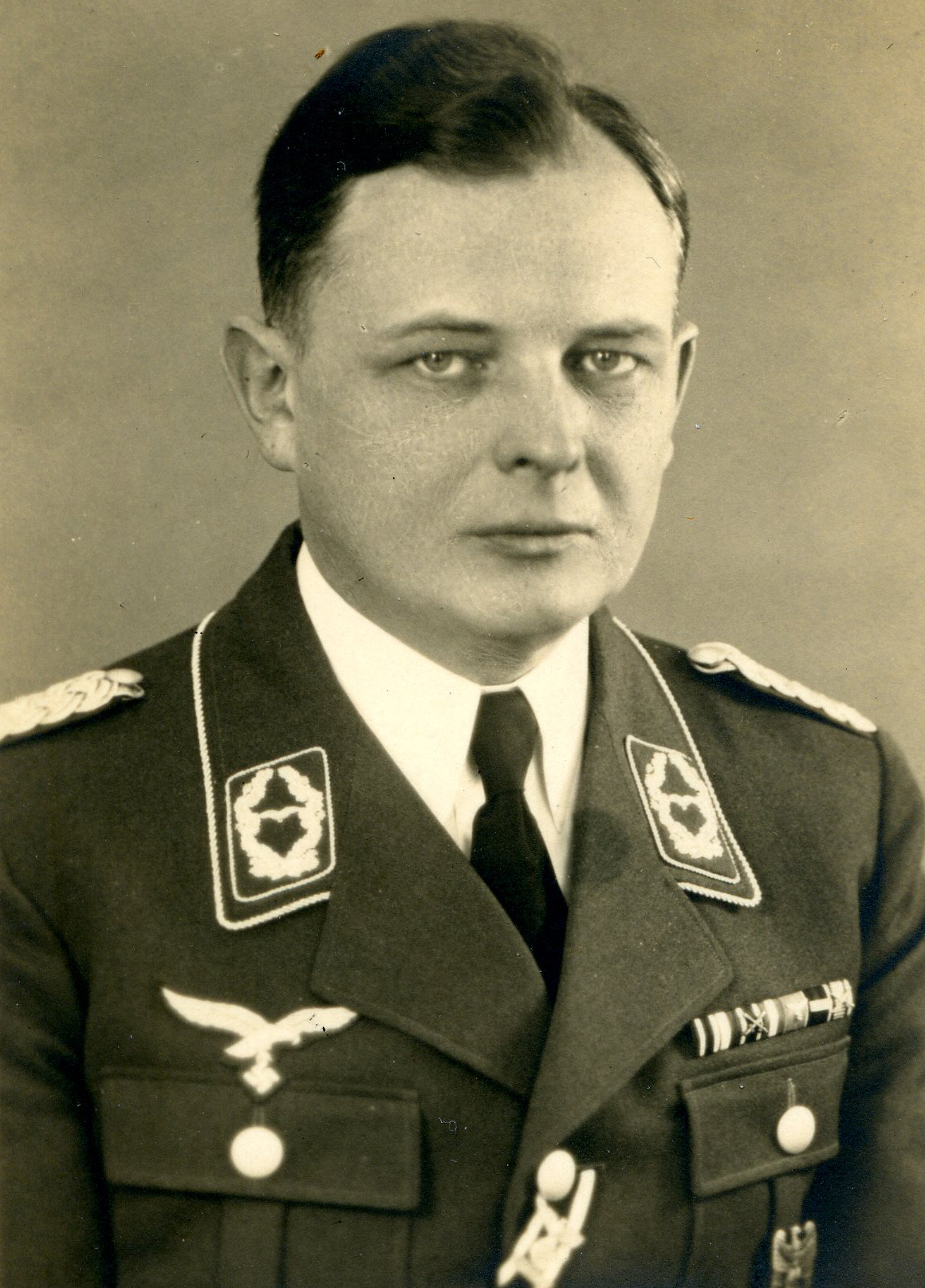
- German military photo of Ritter in 1940
- Born: Nikolaus Adolph Fritz Ritter; 8 January 1899; Rheydt, German Empire
- Died: 9 April 1974 (aged 75); Germany
- Relatives: Mary Aurora Evans Ritter (spouse); Irmgard Klitzing (spouse); Katharine Francis Ritter Wallace (daughter); Nikolaus Haviland Ritter (son); Karin Ritter (daughter)
- Military career
- Allegiance: German Empire; Weimar Germany; Nazi Germany
- Branch: Abwehr (German Military Intelligence Service)
- Service years: 1914–1919; 1936–1944
- Rank: Oberstleutnant (Lieutenant colonel)
- Nickname: Dr. Rantzau (code name)
- Commands: Chief of Air Intelligence in the Abwehr
- Conflicts: World War I; World War II

Nikolaus Ritter (8 January 1899 – 9 April 1974) is best known as the Chief of Air Intelligence in the Abwehr (German military intelligence) who led spy rings in the United Kingdom and the United States from 1936 to 1941.

== Early life ==
Ritter was born in Rheydt, Germany, the son of Nikolaus Josef Ritter and Käthe Hellhoff. He attended Volksschule (primary school) in Bad Bederkesa from 1905 to 1910, Klostergymnasium (high school) in Flensburg from 1911 to 1914, and he finished his high school diploma (Abitur) at Domgynasium in Verden an der Aller, near Bremen. He then enlisted in the German Imperial Army in World War I and was assigned to the 162nd Infantry Regiment. He served on the Western Front in France where he was twice wounded. Ritter was promoted to Lieutenant in June 1918.

After World War I, Ritter moved to Lauban, Germany (now Poland) and he became an apprentice with a textiles company from 1920 to 1921. In 1921, he attended the Prussian Technical School for Textiles in Sorau, Germany (now Poland) and became a textile engineer. He returned to Lauban as a superintendent of a textile company, but then emigrated to the United States in January 1924 and found employment as a clerk at the Mallinson Silk Company in New York and he also worked odd jobs as a floor layer, house painter, metalworker and dishwasher. He married Mary Aurora Evans (1898 - 1997), an Irish-American teacher from Alabama in 1926, and together they had two children: Nikolaus Haviland Ritter (21 December 1933 – 2009) and Katharine Francis Ritter (13 December 1934 – 11 January 1997).

In spring 1935, Ritter returned to Germany with his wife and children to visit his ailing father, but in October of that same year, he left his family in Germany and made a brief round-trip back to New York State. In 1936 Ritter joined the Abwehr, German Military Intelligence Service, and settled in Bremen and later in Hamburg with his wife and children. Aurora filed for divorce on grounds of abandonment in the autumn of 1937. Ritter married Irmgard von Klitzing in 1939 and with her had a daughter, Karin Ritter (2 January 1940 – ?). Unable to flee Nazi Germany, Aurora and the children lived in Hamburg until 1941, when the United States entered the war, and she again attempted to return to the United States, but her children were abducted en route. After locating her son and daughter she was forced to remain in Germany where she suffered the devastation of the Hamburg Allied bombing. Aurora and the children returned to the United States in summer 1946. Katharine, a.k.a. KF Ritter, published a 2006 memoir on the life of her mother - Aurora: An Alabama school teacher in Germany struggles to keep her children during WWII after she discovers her husband is a German spy.

== Spymaster ==
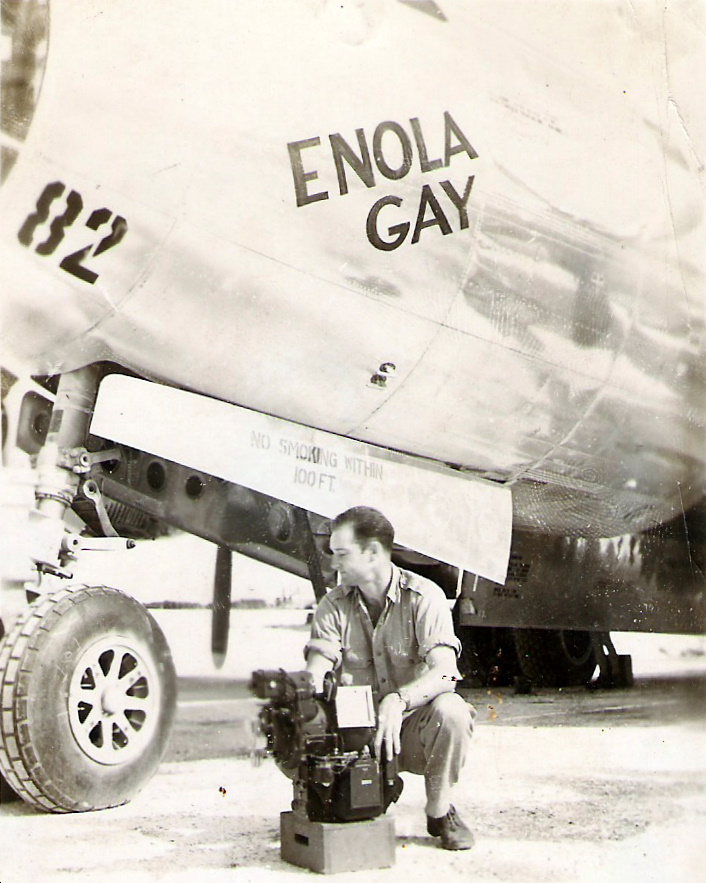
Enola Gay bombardier Thomas Ferebee with the Norden Bombsight on Tinian after the dropping of the atomic bomb Little Boy.

In the late 1930s, Ritter became Chief of Air Intelligence in the Abwehr and he operated under the code name: DR. RANTZAU. Admiral Wilhelm Canaris, the head of the Abwehr, instructed Ritter to contact a former spymaster he knew from the first World War who was living in New York, Fritz Joubert Duquesne. Back in 1931, Ritter had met Duquesne in New York, and the two spies reconnected in New York on 3 December 1937. Ritter also met with Herman W. Lang, a spy who operated under the code name: PAUL.

Herman Lang worked as a machinist, draftsman, and assembly inspector for the Carl L. Norden Company where he had been contracted to manufacture an advanced, top secret military bomber part, the Norden bombsight. He provided Ritter a large drawing of the Norden bombsight which Ritter stored inside of a hollow cane umbrella and that he took back to Germany by ship. The Germans proceeded to build a model from the drawings, and later brought Lang to Germany to work on and finish an improved version of the bombsight. While in Germany, Lang met with Ritter and was also received by Hermann Göring. In 1945, General George Patton's Third U.S. Army Division came upon a hidden factory in the Tyrolean Alps and captured the factory used to produce the German version of the Norden bombsight.

Everett "Ed" Minster Roeder, another German agent in the U.S., worked for the Sperry Gyroscope Company of Brooklyn as an engineer and designer of confidential materials for the U.S. Army and Navy. From Roeder the Abwehr obtained the plans for an advanced automatic pilot device that was later used in Luftwaffe fighters and bombers. Roeder also disclosed blueprints of the complete radio instrumentation of the new Glenn Martin bomber, classified drawings of range finders, blind-flying instruments, a bank-and-turn indicator, a navigator compass, a wiring diagram of the Lockheed Hudson bomber, and diagrams of the Hudson gun mountings.

Ritter employed several other successful agents across the U.S., but he also made the mistake of recruiting a man who would later become a double agent, William Sebold. On 8 February 1940, Ritter sent Sebold to New York under the alias of Harry Sawyer and instructed him to set up a shortwave radio-transmitting station to establish contact with the German shortwave station abroad. Sebold was also instructed to use the code name TRAMP and to contact a fellow agent code named DUNN, Fritz Duquesne.

=== Duquesne Spy Ring ===
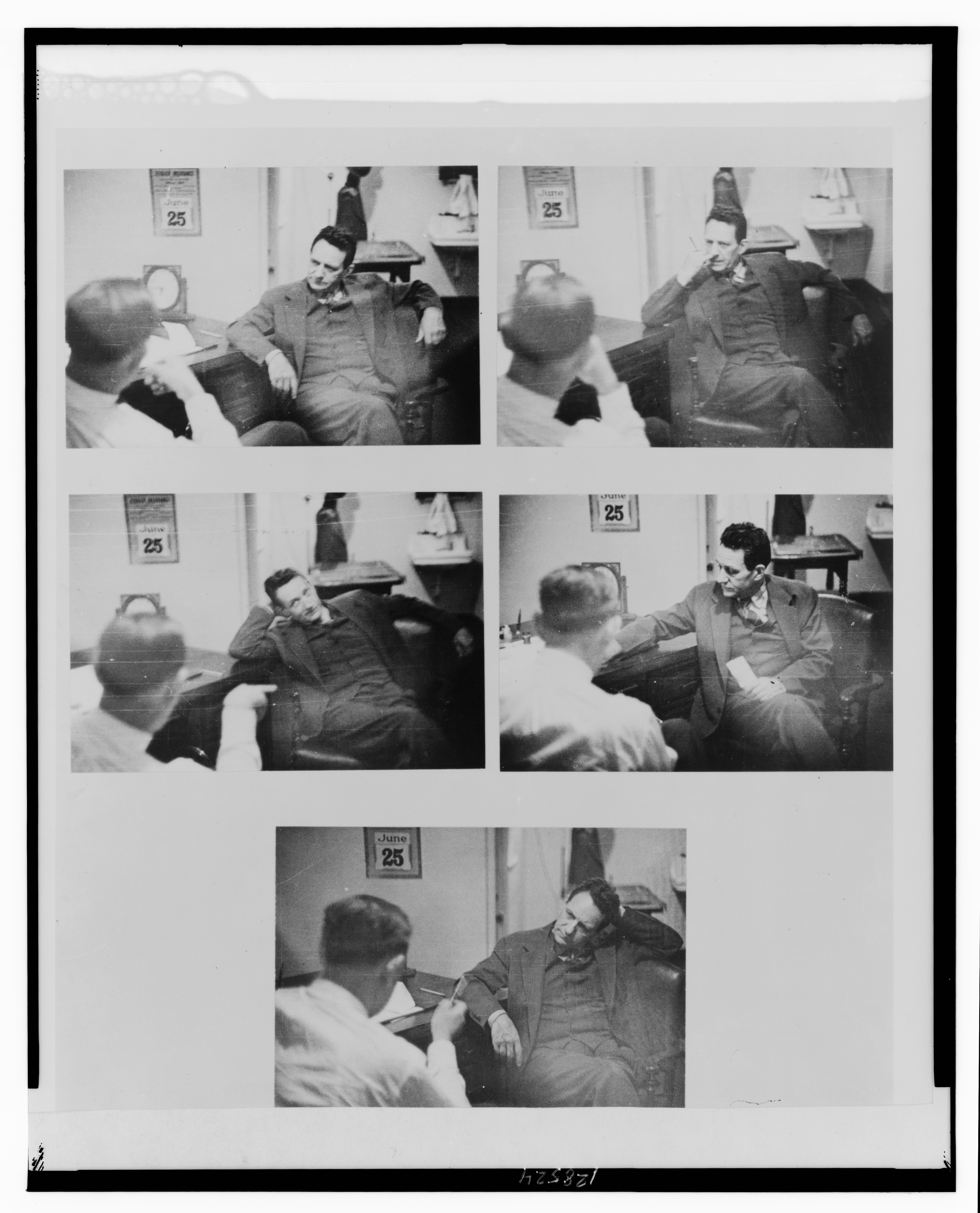
FBI surveillance photographs of Duquesne in the office of William Sebold, 25 June 1941

Once the FBI discovered through Selbold that Duquesne was again in New York operating as a German spy, director J. Edgar Hoover provided a background briefing to President Franklin Roosevelt. FBI agent Newkirk, using the name Ray McManus, was now assigned to DUNN and he rented a room immediately above Duquesne's apartment near Central Park and used a hidden microphone to record Duquesne's conversations.

The FBI leased three adjacent rooms in Times Square. One room would serve as double-agent Sebold's office from which he would receive intelligence reports from Abwehr spies that would later be censored by the FBI and partially transmitted by Sebold via coded short-wave radio to Germany. The other two rooms were used by German-speaking FBI agents who would listen in with headphones and record the meetings using a motion picture camera behind a two-way wall mirror. The first time Duquesne arrived at Sebold's office, he surprised the FBI agents by conducting an examination of the office, opening chests, looking in corners and around mirrors, and pointedly asking Sebold, "where are the mics?" Once Duquesne believed he was safe, he raised his pants leg and removed documents from his sock, such as: a sketch and photo of the M1 Garand semi-automatic rifle, a drawing of a new light tank design, a photo of a U.S. Navy Mosquito boat, a photo of a grenade launcher, and reports on U.S. tanks he had observed at bases at West Point and in Tennessee. Duquesne also described sabotage techniques he had used in earlier wars such as small bombs with slow fuses he could drop through a hole in his pants pocket, and he commented on where he might use these devices again.

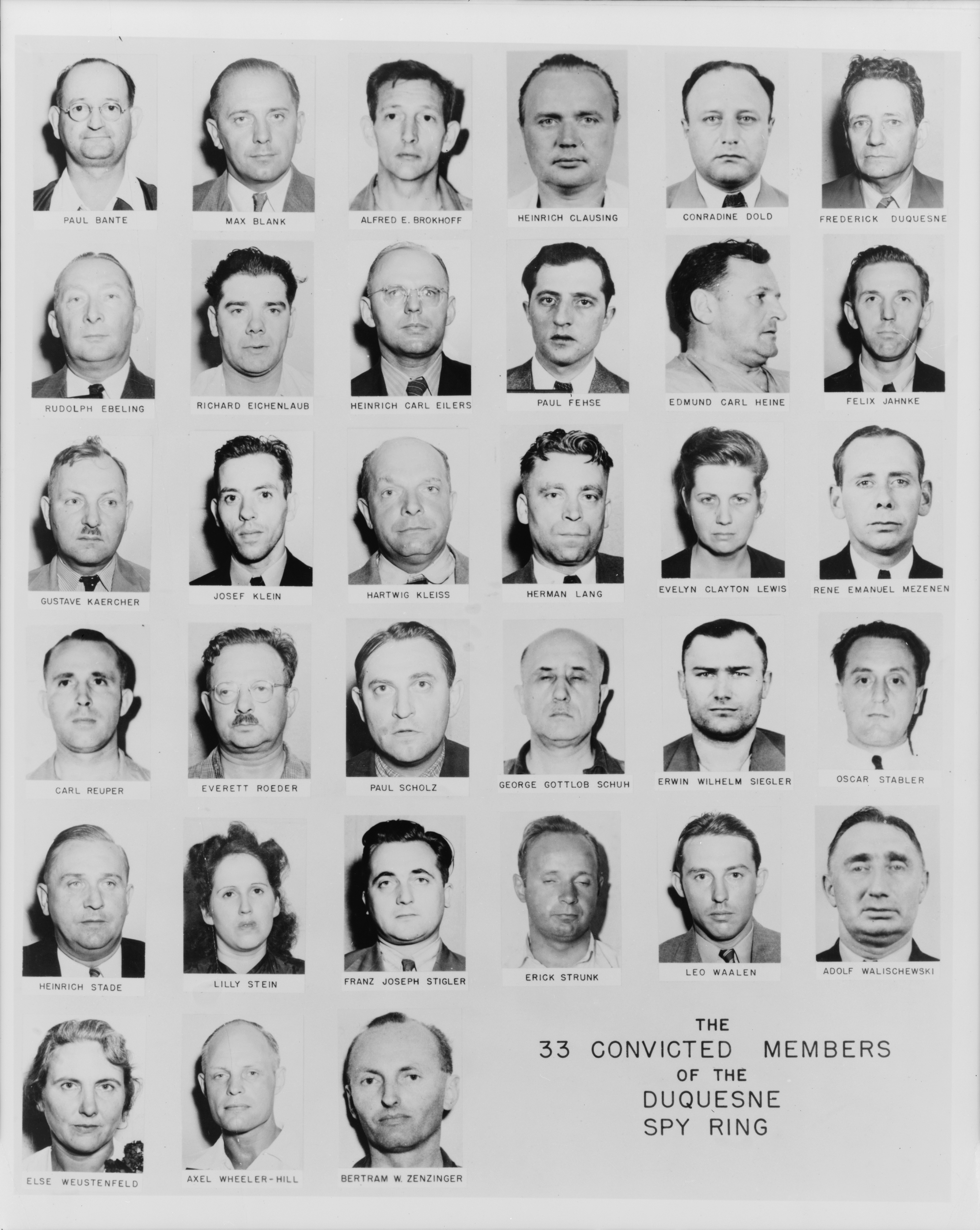
The 33 convicted members of the Duquesne spy ring. Duquesne is pictured in the top, right. (FBI print)

On 28 June 1941, following a two-year investigation, the FBI arrested Duquesne and 32 Nazi spies on charges of relaying secret information on U.S. weaponry and shipping movements to Germany. On 2 January 1942, less than a month after the U.S. was attacked by Japan at Pearl Harbor and Germany declared war on the United States, the 33 members of the Duquesne Spy Ring were sentenced to serve a total of more than 300 years in prison. They were found guilty in what historian Peter Duffy said in 2014 is "still to this day the largest espionage case in the history of the United States." One German spymaster later commented that the ring's roundup delivered 'the death blow' to their espionage efforts in the United States. J. Edgar Hoover called his FBI swoop on Duquesne's ring the greatest spy roundup in U.S. history. In a 1942 memo to his superiors, Admiral Canaris of the Abwehr reported on the importance of several of his captured spies by noting their valued contributions, and he writes that Duquesne "delivered valuable reports and important technical material in the original, including U.S. gas masks, radio-controlled apparatus, leak proof fuel tanks, television instruments, small bombs for airplanes versus airplanes, air separator, and propeller-driving mechanisms. Items delivered were labeled 'valuable', and several 'good' and 'very good'."

=== Great Britain ===
Arthur Graham Owens, a Welshman born 14 April 1899, was the owner of the Owens Battery Company in Britain that made batteries for both the Royal Navy and the German Kriegsmarine. He was briefly employed by SIS/MI6, the British Secret Intelligence Service, to spy on German shipyards in early 1936. But in late 1936 SIS became aware that Owens was in touch with the German Secret Service (Abwehr) and arranged for his mail to be intercepted by MI5. In October 1936 MI5 intercepted Owens' reply to Hilmar Dierks of the Abwehr, agreeing to a meeting in Cologne. The return address was Postfach (Post Office box) 629, Hamburg, which had already been compromised by another British spy, the daredevil pilot Major Christopher Draper - the Germans had no idea the British knew all about it. Owens operated as an Abwehr agent No. 3504, under Ritter and went by the code name: JOHNNY O'BRIEN.

Despite their caution, Owens became aware that he was being followed by watchers from MI5 and in September 1937 he informed Colonel Edward Peal of SIS that he had made a very good contact in Germany. Peal told him his services were no longer required as there could be no question of his 'running with the hare and hunting with the hounds.' Ritter arranged for Owens to receive the most up-to-date training in German spycraft, so he could report detailed information on airfields, factories & special devices used by the RAF. In September 1938 Owens informed SIS that he would receive a German radio transmitter, which arrived via diplomatic pouch to the German Embassy in London on 16 January 1939 and was concealed in a harmless-looking suitcase and hidden in a cloakroom at London's Victoria Station. Owens turned it over to MI5 for inspection, but was allowed to keep the radio until the outbreak of war when Owens was arrested and incarcerated at Wormwood Scrubs Prison.

Although Owens met with Ritter in Hamburg on 11 August 1939, Owens contacted Inspector Gagan of Special Branch and volunteered his services to the British Government the day after Britain's declaration of war against Germany on 4 September. Owens was visited in his cell on 8 September by MI5's Major Thomas Argyll Robertson (Tar), who proposed his wireless set should be brought in and used to re-establish contact with Germany, but this time it would be under MI5's control and direction. Faced with the stark reality of the penalties meted out for spying against his own country, Owens agreed to the proposal and became Britain's first double agent whose codename was SNOW. The wireless was set up in his cell, and on 9 September the first MI5 controlled radio transmission was sent out in code notifying Ritter, 'all ready have repaired radio send instructions now waiting reply.'

Owens became a key agent in Britain's Double-Cross System operated by the "Twenty [XX] Committee", a complex double-agent program whose name comes from an inter-agency board chaired by MI5 with representatives from all British intelligence services and interested departments. MI5 provided Owens with the false names of agents to give to Ritter, and also supplied Owens with MI5 plants to introduce to Ritter as potential German agents who were willing to obtain information and carry out acts of sabotage against Britain. In the summer of 1940, Ritter suddenly began sending Owens advance warning of the first German invasion spies via his radio transmitter which was now under MI5's control.Once captured, MI5 would give these Abwehr agents a choice of becoming double-agents with MI5, or face death by firing squad. Several former Abwehr chose to work for Britain and delivered vital information to the Allies, including details about troop movements and the keys to cracking German codes. These ‘turned’ double agents were successfully used to plant misinformation and practice large-scale deceptions on the Germans.

But Owens regularly exaggerated his importance and MI5 continued to be suspicious of him. On one occasion, MI5 sent a second double-agent, Sam McCarthy (code name: BISCUIT), with Owens to rendezvous with Ritter in the North Sea. The mission was aborted by McCarthy who became convinced Owens was a genuine Nazi spy, who would immediately betray his identity as a British spy to Ritter as soon as he arrived by submarine or seaplane. Owens' downfall came after MI5 sent him on a mission to Lisbon in early 1941 to introduce their latest plant, an ex RNAS officer come confidence trickster, called Walter Dicketts, who worked in intelligence for the Air Ministry during World War I, to meet Ritter and get himself recruited as a German spy. Given the codename CELERY, Dicketts managed to outwit his interrogators in Hamburg and Berlin and return to Britain as, in the Abwehr's eyes, a German spy with the codename JACK BROWN. When both men returned to Britain their stories didn't match and MI5 spent countless hours trying to establish who was telling the truth. In the end Dicketts' testimony was believed over Owens, who was imprisoned for the remainder of the war for betraying Dicketts and for informing Ritter that his German radio set was under the control of MI5. Dicketts was sent back to Lisbon in June to help Ritter's assistant, George Seller to defect to Britain in return for being allowed to rejoin his relatives in the USA. Ritter continued to believe Owens was always his spy until his death, and that he had been betrayed by Dicketts. MI5 believed Owens was primarily interested in making money from both sides and that neither side trusted him entirely. After the war Owens moved to Ireland, disappeared into obscurity, and died in 1957.

Over the course of the war, the Twenty Committee grew to about 120 double-agents. The Twenty Committee almost abandoned its double-agents after the betrayal of Owens, but when the Abwehr failed to take any demonstrable countermeasures, the Twenty Committee chose instead to provide its double-agents with disinformation to pass on to Germany. After the war it was discovered that Ritter had known that the cover for his agents in Britain had been blown, but due to fear of repercussions Ritter did not inform his Abwehr superiors.

=== North Africa ===
Before the Second World War, Hauptmann Graf (Captain Count) László Almásy of the Royal Hungarian Air Force had lived in North Africa where he had been a desert explorer, mobility expert, and the celebrated aerial discoverer of the Lost Oasis of Zerzura (the subject of the later novel and film, The English Patient). In 1939, Almásy published in Germany a book based on his years in North Africa - Unbekannte Sahara; mit Flugzeug und Auto in der Libyschen Wüste (English: Unknown Sahara: With Airplane and Automobile in the Libyan Desert) With an interest in forming a spy ring in North Africa, the Abwehr sent Ritter to meet with Almásy in Budapest.

Ritter conceived of a plan, known as Plan El Masri, Almásy's acquaintance with Egyptian General Aziz el Masri, an Arab nationalist whom the British had ousted as Army chief of staff, to organize an Arab revolt against the British. Abwehr chief, Admiral Canaris, agreed to the plan, and sent Ritter to Taormina in Sicily to form the Aufklärungskommando Nordost Afrika (Reconnaissance Command, Northeast Africa) with Almásy as his second in command. Ritter's Sonderkommando (special forces unit) was tasked to provide military intelligence on desert warfare to Field Marshal Erwin Rommel, extract el Masri from Cairo, and to form a spy ring in Egypt. Immediately assigned to Ritter were two pilots, a Fieseler Fi 156 Storch liaison plane, and two Heinkel He 111 medium bombers for long-distance missions. In addition, four multi-lingual Abwehr radio operators were assigned in Sicily, Greece, Libya, and Cairo.

On May 16, 1941, Almásy flew to Egypt to meet with el Masri, but the plane carrying el Masri was unable to reach the rendezvous point; it had developed engine trouble and crash landed 10 miles outside Cairo. On June 17, they tried again, only this time Ritter would meet el Masri in Egypt. However, Ritter's pilot refused to land at the designated meeting place due to difficult terrain and near darkness, and fighting over Libya forced Ritter's plane to ditch in the Mediterranean, wounding Ritter and forcing the survivors to spend the next 9 hours in a life raft before washing up on the beach.

== Later military service ==
When Ritter returned to Germany he became a commander of several anti-aircraft installations, including an installation in Hannover in late 1944.

== Later life ==
In 1972, Ritter published his memoir - Deckname Dr. Rantzau; die Aufzeichnungen des Nikolaus Ritter, Offizier im Geheimen Nachrichtendienst. In 2019, Katharine Ritter Wallace translated and edited Deckname Dr. Rantzau into English: Code Name Dr. Rantzau - The Notes of Nikolaus Ritter, Officer in the Secret Intelligence Service). He died in 1974 in Germany.

== Notes ==
Source notes
