= Double-Cross System =

British counter-espionage and deception operation of WW2

The Double-Cross System or XX System was a World War II counter-espionage and deception operation of the British Security Service (MI5). Nazi agents in Britain – real and false – were captured, turned themselves in or simply announced themselves, and were then used by the British to broadcast mainly disinformation to their Nazi controllers. Its operations were overseen by the Twenty Committee under the chairmanship of John Cecil Masterman; the name of the committee comes from the number 20 in Roman numerals: "XX" (i.e. a double cross).

The policy of MI5 during the war was initially to use the system for counter-espionage. It was only later that its potential for deception purposes was realised. Many of the agents from the German intelligence services Abwehr (armed forces) and Sicherheitsdienst (SD, the Nazi party) who reached British shores turned themselves in to the authorities, while others were apprehended after they made mistakes during their operations. In addition, some were false agents who had tricked the Germans into believing they would spy for them if they helped them reach England (e.g., Treasure, Fido).

Later agents were instructed to contact agents who, unknown to the Abwehr, were controlled by the British. The Abwehr and SD sent agents over by parachute drop, submarine, or travel via neutral countries. The last route was most commonly used, with agents often impersonating refugees. After the war, it was discovered that all the agents Germany sent to Britain had given themselves up or had been captured, with the possible exception of one who committed suicide.

== Early agents ==
Following a July 1940 conference in Kiel, the Abwehr (German intelligence) began an espionage campaign against Britain involving intelligence gathering and sabotage. Spies were sent over from Europe in various ways; some parachuted or were delivered by submarine. Others entered the country on false passports or posing as refugees. Public perception in Britain was that the country was full of well-trained German spies, who were deeply integrated into society. There was widespread "spy-mania", as Churchill put it. The truth was that between September and November 1940 fewer than 25 agents arrived in the country; mostly of non-German extraction, they were badly trained and poorly motivated.

The agents were not difficult to spot, and it became easier still when the German Enigma machine encryption was broken. MI5, with advance warning of infiltration, had no trouble picking up almost all of the spies sent to the country. Writing in 1972, John C. Masterman (who had, later in the war, headed the Twenty Committee) said that by 1941, MI5 "actively ran and controlled the German espionage system in [the United Kingdom]." It was not an idle boast; post-war records confirmed that none of the Abwehr agents, bar one who committed suicide, went unnoticed.

Once caught, the spies were deposited in the care of Lieutenant Colonel Robin Stephens at Camp 020 (Latchmere House, Richmond). (Note: Nicknamed "Tin Eye", Stephens' success as an interrogator was due to his abilities as a linguist, his thorough preparation and his ability to mix sympathy with firmness. Violence of any sort was forbidden at Camp 020.) After Stephens, a notorious interrogator, had picked apart their life history, the agents were either spirited away or if judged acceptable, offered the chance to turn double agent on the Germans.

Control of the new double agents fell to Thomas Argyll Robertson (usually called 'Tar', from his initials), a charismatic MI5 agent. A Scot and something of a playboy, Robertson had some early experience with double agents; just prior to the war he had been case officer to Arthur Owens (code name Snow). Owens was an oddity and it became apparent that he was playing off the Germans and British, although to what end Robertson was unable to uncover. Robertson dispatched an ex-RNAS officer called Walter Dicketts (code name Celery) to neutral Lisbon in early 1941 to meet Owens' German spymaster, Nikolaus Ritter from the Abwehr, to establish Owens' bona fides. Unknown to Dicketts, Owens had betrayed him to the Germans before Dicketts entered Germany to be interrogated by experts from the Abwehr in Hamburg.

Although Dicketts managed to get himself recruited as a German agent (while continuing to report to MI5), Owens claimed that Dicketts' survival meant he had been 'turned' by the Germans. When both agents returned to England, Robertson and his team spent countless hours trying to establish which agent was telling the truth. In the end Owens was interned for endangering Dicketts' life and for revealing the important information that his German radio transmitter was controlled by MI5. The whole affair resulted in the collapse of the entire Snow network comprising the double agents Owens, GW, Biscuit, Charlie, Summer and Celery. The experiment had not appeared to be a success but MI5 had learned lessons about how Abwehr operated and how double agents might be useful.

Robertson believed that turning German spies would have numerous benefits, disclosing what information Abwehr wanted and to mislead them as part of a military deception. It would also discourage them from sending more agents, if they believed an operational network existed. Section B1A (a subordinate of B section, under Guy Liddell) was formed and Robertson was put in charge of handling the double-agent programme.

Robertson's first agents were not a success, Giraffe (George Graf) was never really used and Gander (Kurt Goose; MI5 had a penchant for amusingly relevant code names), had been sent to Britain with a radio that could only transmit and both were quickly decommissioned. The next two attempts were even more farcical; Gösta Caroli and Wulf Schmidt (a Danish citizen) landed, via parachute, in September 1940. The two were genuine Nazis, had trained together and were friends. Caroli was coerced into turning double in return for Schmidt's life being spared, whilst Schmidt was told that Caroli had sold him out and in anger swapped sides.

Caroli quickly became a problem; he attempted to strangle his MI5 handler before making an escape, carrying a canoe on a motorcycle. He vaguely planned to row to the Netherlands but came unstuck after falling off the bike in front of a policeman. He was eventually recaptured and judged too much trouble to be used. Schmidt was more of a success; codenamed 'Tate', he continued to contact Germany until May 1945. These eccentric spies made Robertson aware that handling double agents was going to be a difficult task.

== Methods of operation ==
The main form of communication that agents used with their handlers was secret writing. Letters were intercepted by the postal censorship authorities and some agents were caught. Later in the war, wireless sets were provided by the Germans. Eventually transmissions purporting to be from one double agent were facilitated by transferring the operation of the set to the main headquarters of MI5. On the British side, the fight against the Abwehr and SD was made much easier by the breaking of German ciphers. Abwehr hand ciphers were cracked early in the war and SD hand ciphers and Abwehr Enigma ciphers followed on 8 November 1941 by Dilly Knox, agents sent messages to the Abwehr in the simple code which was then sent on using an Enigma machine, with the simple codes broken it helped break the daily Enigma code.

The Abwehr used a different version of the Enigma machine from other branches of the Wehrmacht. In November 1942 a machine was captured in Algiers during Operation Torch. While it lacked a plug board, the three rotors on the machine had been changed to rotate 11, 15 and 19 times respectively rather than once every 26 letters adding to the complexity of the cipher breaking. Additionally, a rotating plate on the left acted as a fourth rotor. The capture of a machine lead to quicker decoding of German messages. The signals intelligence allowed an accurate assessment of whether the double agents were really trusted by the Germans and the effect of their information.

A crucial aspect of the system was the need for genuine information to be sent along with the deception material. This need caused problems early in the war, with those who controlled the release of information being reluctant to provide even a small amount of relatively innocuous genuine material. Later in the war, as the system became better organised, genuine information was integrated into the deception system. It was used to disguise the development of "Gee", the Allies' navigation aid for bombers. One of the agents sent genuine information about Operation Torch to the Germans. It was postmarked before the landing but due to delays deliberately introduced by the British authorities, the information did not reach the Germans until after the Allied troops were ashore. The information impressed the Germans as it appeared to date from before the attack, but it was militarily useless to them.

== Operation outside the United Kingdom ==
It was not only in the United Kingdom that the system was operated. A number of agents connected with the system were run in neutral Spain and Portugal. Some even had direct contact with the Germans in occupied Europe. One of the most famous agents who operated outside of the UK was Dušan Popov (Tricycle).

In one instance, an agent even started running deception operations independently from Portugal, using little more than guidebooks, maps, and a vivid imagination to convince his Abwehr handlers that he was spying in the UK. This agent, Juan Pujol García (Garbo), created a network of phantom sub-agents and eventually convinced the British authorities that he was useful. He and his fictitious network were absorbed into the main double-cross system and he became so respected by Abwehr that they stopped landing agents in Britain after 1942. The Germans became dependent on the spurious information that was fed to them by Garbo's network and the other double-cross agents.

== Operation Fortitude and D-Day landings ==
The British put their double-agent network to work in support of Operation Fortitude, a plan to deceive the Germans about the location of the Normandy Landings in France. Allowing one of the double agents to claim to have stolen documents describing the invasion plans might have aroused suspicion. Instead, agents were allowed to report minutiae, such as insignia on soldiers' uniforms and unit markings on vehicles. The observations in the south-central areas largely gave accurate information about the units located there. Reports from southwest England indicated few troop sightings, when in reality many units were housed there. Reports from the southeast depicted the real and the notional Operation Quicksilver forces.

Any military planner would know that to mount an invasion of Europe from England, Allied units had to be staged around the country, with those that would land first placed nearest to the invasion point. German intelligence used the agent reports to construct an order of battle for the Allied forces, that placed the centre of gravity of the invasion force opposite Pas de Calais, the point on the French coast closest to England and therefore a likely invasion site.

The deception was so effective that the Germans kept 15 divisions in reserve near Calais even after the invasion had begun, lest it prove to be a diversion from the main invasion at Calais. Early battle reports of insignia on Allied units only confirmed the information the double agents had sent, increasing the Germans' trust in their network. Agent Garbo was informed in radio messages from Germany after the invasion that he had been awarded the Iron Cross.

== V-weapons deception ==
The British noticed that, during the V-1 flying bomb attacks of 1944, the weapons were falling 2–3 mi (3–5 km) short of Trafalgar Square, the actual Luftwaffe aiming points such as Tower Bridge being unknown to the British. Duncan Sandys was told to get MI5-controlled German agents such as Zig Zag and Tate to report the V-1 impacts back to Germany. To make the Germans aim short, the British used these double agents to exaggerate the number of V-1s falling in the north and west of London and to underreport those falling in the south and east. Around 22 June, only one of seven impacts was reported south of the Thames, when 3/4 of the V-1s had fallen there. Although the Germans plotted a sample of V-1s which had radio transmitters, showing that they had fallen short, the telemetry was ignored in favour of the agents' reports.

When the Germans received a false double cross V-1 report that there was considerable damage in Southampton—which had not been a target—the V-1s were temporarily aimed at the south coast ports. The double cross deception had caused a "re-targeting" from London, not just inaccurate aiming. When V-1s launched from Heinkel He 111s on 7 July at Southampton were inaccurate, British advisor Frederick Lindemann recommended that the agents report heavy losses, to save hundreds of Londoners each week at the expense of only a few lives in the ports. When the Cabinet learned of the deception on 15 August, Herbert Morrison ruled against it, saying that they had no right to decide that one man should die while another should survive. However R. V. Jones refused to call off the plan absent written orders, which never came, and the deception continued.

When the V-2 rocket "blitz" began with only a few minutes from launch to impact, the deception was enhanced by providing locations damaged by bombing, verifiable by aerial reconnaissance, for impacts in central London but each "time-tagged" with an earlier impact that had fallen 5–8 mi (8–10 km) short of central London. From mid-January to mid-February 1945, the mean point of V-2 impacts edged eastward at the rate of a couple of miles a week, with more and more V-2s falling short of central London. Of the V-2s aimed at London, more than half landed outside the London Civil Defence Region.

== List of agents ==
MI5 recorded approximately 120 Double-Cross agents. This list includes those agents whose real identities have been released.

- Artist – Johnny Jebsen
- Balloon – Dickie Metcalf
- Biscuit – Sam McCarthy
- Bronx – Elvira Chaudoir
- Brutus – Roman Czerniawski
- Celery – Walter Dicketts
- Cheese – Renato Levi, Italian Servizio Informazioni Militare agent
- Dreadnaught – Ivan Popov, brother of Dušan Popov, Tricycle
- Fido – Roger Grosjean
- Freak – Marquis Frano de Bona
- Gala - Anna Agiraki
- Garbo – Juan Pujol García
- Gelatine – Gerda Sullivan (Friedl Gaertner)
- Gilbert – André Latham, jointly handled by SIS and the French Deuxième Bureau
- GW – Gwilym Williams
- Hamlet – Dr Koestler, Austrian
- La Chatte – Mathilde Carré
- Meteor – Tomas Sardelic
- Monoplane – Paul Jeannin 6th Army Group - French - prior codenames Jacques and Twit; German codename: Normandie. Former radio operator on the French liner SS Normandie.
- Mullet – Thornton, a Briton born in Belgium
- Mutt and Jeff – Helge Moe and Tor Glad, two Norwegians
- Puppet – Mr Fanto, Briton
- Quicksilver - George Liossis
- Rainbow – a man named Pierce
- Snow – Arthur Owens
- Summer – Gösta Caroli
- Tate – Wulf Schmidt
- Treasure – Nathalie Sergueiew (Lily Sergeyev)
- Tricycle – Dušan Popov
- Watchdog – Werner von Janowski
- Zigzag – Eddie Chapman

== Bibliography ==
- Crowdy, Terry (20 December 2011). Deceiving Hitler: Double-Cross and Deception in World War II. Osprey Publishing. ISBN 978-1-84603-135-9.
- Haufler, Hervie (2014-04-01). The Spies Who Never Were: The True Story of the Nazi Spies Who Were Actually Allied Double Agents. Open Road Media. ISBN 978-1-4976-2262-3.
- Irving, David (1964). The Mare's Nest. London: William Kimber & Co. OCLC 602399051.
- Macintyre, Ben (27 Mar 2012). Double Cross: The True Story of The D-Day Spies. Bloomsbury Publishing. ISBN 978-1408819906.
- Masterman, John C (1972) [1945]. The Double-Cross System in the War of 1939 to 1945. Australian National University Press. ISBN 978-0-7081-0459-0.
- Ordway, Frederick I, III; Sharpe, Mitchell R (1979). The Rocket Team. Apogee Books Space Series 36. New York: Thomas Y. Crowell. Note: Ordway/Sharpe cite Masterman
- Jones, RV (1978). Most Secret War. Hamish Hamilton. ISBN 0-241-89746-7.
- Popov, Dusko (1 January 1974). Spy/Counterspy (First ed.). Weidenfeld and Nicolson. ISBN 0448116065.
- Winnington, G. Peter (July 2023). Codename Treasure: the life of D-Day Spy, Lily Sergueiew. Pen and Sword; First Edition. ISBN 978-1399045278.
- Witt, Carolinda (November 2017). Double Agent Celery. Barnsley, UK: Pen & Sword Books. ISBN 9781526716149.
