= Ronald Read =

Ronald Read may refer to:

- Ronald C. Read (1924–2019), British mathematician
- Ronald Kingsley Read (1887–1975), creator of a writing system
- Ronald Read (philanthropist) (1921–2014), American philanthropist

== See also ==
- Ron Reed (born 1942), American Major League Baseball pitcher and National Basketball Association player
- Ronnie Reed (1916–1995), British radio engineer and MI5 officer
