= Gastão de Freitas Ferraz =

Gastão Crawford de Freitas Ferraz was a Portuguese spy working for the Abwehr. He was one of two radio operators on board the Gil Eanes, the codfish fleet support ship on the Atlantic. Ferraz almost succeeded in alerting the German military leadership to the imminent "Operation Torch" in 1942.

The British HMS Duke of York stopped the Gil Eanes on 1 November 1942 and a commando arrested Freitas. During interrogation Freitas was shown a photo of the Abwehr resident in Lisbon, Kuno Weltzien. Freitas became nervous at this moment. The British had picked up radio traffic indicating naval espionage, possibly compromising secrecy on "Operation Torch". On 15 October MI5 asked for permission to arrest the neutral Portuguese fishermen, since they knew of two radio contacts between the fishing fleet and the Germans. Freitas was interned in "Camp 020" in London with 500 other spies, some of whom then radioed false messages to the Germans as double agents. The Gil Eanes had been sailing close to General Patton's armada, en route to the invasion in Morocco ("Torch").
