= John Cecil Masterman =

English academic and spymaster (1891–1977)

Sir John Cecil Masterman, OBE
- Full name: Sir John Cecil Masterman
- Born: 12 January 1891 Kingston upon Thames, England
- Died: 6 June 1977 (aged 86) England
- College: Worcester College, Oxford; University of Freiburg

Grand Slam singles results
- Wimbledon: 4R (1923)

Grand Slam doubles results
- Wimbledon: QF (1923, 1924)

Grand Slam mixed doubles results
- Wimbledon: 2R (1921)

Sir John Cecil Masterman, OBE (12 January 1891 – 6 June 1977) was a British academic, sportsman and author. His highest-profile role was as Vice-Chancellor of the University of Oxford, but he was also well known as chairman of the Twenty Committee, which during the Second World War ran the Double-Cross System, controlling double agents in Britain.

== Academic background ==
Masterman was born in Kingston upon Thames, and educated at the Royal Naval College, Osborne, and Dartmouth, then at Worcester College, Oxford, where he read modern history. In 1914, at the outbreak of the First World War, he was an exchange lecturer at the University of Freiburg, and as a result spent four years interned as an enemy alien in the Ruhleben internment camp.

After his return from captivity, Masterman became a tutor in Modern History at Christ Church, Oxford, where he was also censor (senior tutor) from 1920 to 1926. In the 1920s he became notable as a player of cricket, tennis, and hockey, participating in international competitions, and in 1931 toured Canada with the Marylebone Cricket Club; in Stephen Potter's book Gamesmanship he was acknowledged as a master gamesman.

After the Second World War Masterman returned to Oxford, becoming Provost of Worcester College (1946–61), where Ann Mitchell was his secretary until 1949. He was Vice-Chancellor of the University of Oxford during 1957 and 1958. In 1959 he was knighted for his services to education.

== Two Oxford mysteries ==
=== An Oxford Tragedy ===
In 1933, he wrote a murder mystery novel entitled An Oxford Tragedy, set in the fictional Oxford college of St. Thomas's. It was written in the point of view of an Oxford don named Francis Wheatley Winn, who was Senior Tutor at St. Thomas'. He served as Watson to the novel's Sherlock Holmes, an amateur sleuth named Ernst Brendel, a Viennese lawyer "of European reputation".

In the novel, Brendel delivers a series of lectures to the Law Faculty. He had a good reputation as a detective with the quality of "a man to whom secrets will be confided". When an unpopular tutor was found shot in the Dean's rooms, he took it upon himself to solve the crime. He of course solved the case, and the murderer thus exposed committed suicide.

The novel itself was quite unusual for its time in providing an account of how murder affects the tranquil existence of Oxford dons. While it was a variation of the old theme of evil deeds done in a tranquil setting, it did establish the tradition of Oxford-based crime fiction, notably in the works of Michael Innes and Edmund Crispin.

=== The Case of the Four Friends ===
Despite the acclaim that An Oxford Tragedy had garnered, Masterman did not publish a direct follow-up until 1957 (although some of the supporting characters had reappeared in a 1952 novel, To Teach the Senators Wisdom, or, An Oxford Guide-Book). The novel, again starring Ernst Brendel, was called The Case of the Four Friends, which is "a diversion in pre-detection".

In the novel, Brendel is persuaded by a group of friends to relate a story of how he "pre-constructed" a crime, rather than reconstructing it as in the conventional manner. As he says, "To work out the crime before it is committed, to foresee how it will be arranged, and then to prevent it! That's a triumph indeed, and is worth more than all the convictions in the world".

His tale then was about four men, each of them either a potential victim or potential murderer. The pacing of the story is quite slow and the narrative is interrupted from time to time by discussion between Brendel and his listeners. Even so, the novel maintains its interest on the reader throughout, partly because of the originality of its approach.

This novel was the last of his crime stories and he wrote no more works of fiction. However, his best known work was still to come, and it would involve his wartime experiences as part of the Twenty Committee.

== The Twenty Committee ==
When World War II broke out, Masterman was drafted into the Intelligence Corps. After investigating and producing a report into the evacuation of Dunkirk, Masterman was appointed as a Civil Assistant in MI5. Within MI5 he was the chairman of the Twenty Committee, which was a group of British intelligence officials, including wartime amateurs, who held the key to the Double Cross System, which turned German spies into double agents working for the British. The committee's name was a pun based on the Roman numeral XX and its double-cross purpose.

Strictly speaking, the committee was responsible for providing information for the agents to be transmitted to the Abwehr and other German intelligence agencies, deceiving them of Allied intentions and war plans. It was Section B1(a) of MI5, established by Lt. Col. T. A. Robertson, who had the task of finding, turning and handling the agents themselves.

Masterman became an Officer of the Order of the British Empire in June 1944. Robertson was also appointed an OBE in the same London Gazette. They are both listed as Civil Assistant, War Office. In November 1945 at the Savoy Hotel in London, Masterman and a select few of B1 (a) section were awarded the Order of the Yugoslav Crown by the exiled King Peter II.

Although Masterman ran the system, he credited MI5 with originating the idea. It is widely assumed that the writer Ian Fleming, himself involved in wartime intelligence, adapted Masterman's name for the (female) character of Jill Masterson in his James Bond novel Goldfinger (1959).

== Revelations ==
Information about the double-cross system remained secret after the war. In 1958 Masterman began pressing the British intelligence establishment for permission to publish a book about it. Roger Hollis, the head of MI5 at that time, refused to authorize publication, as did Prime Minister Alec Douglas-Home.

However, Masterman was not to be deterred. Revelations about the Cambridge Spy Ring in the 1960s resulted in low morale throughout the intelligence community, and Masterman felt that the publication of a book about the double-cross system would restore public confidence. He pressed his suit once again on the matter.

Masterman also received an Honorary Doctorate from Heriot-Watt University in 1966.

In April 1970, when the government again refused, he decided to have it published in the United States, where he felt he would be out of reach of the Official Secrets Act. He was supported by Norman Holmes Pearson, a member of the Yale University faculty, who nominated Yale University Press as publisher. Pearson was more than happy to help Masterman because he also served in the Twenty Committee (though not a member) as the wartime head of the counterintelligence division of the Office of Strategic Services. Yale had contributed many scholars and students to the OSS, and Chester B. Kerr, director of the press, saw the importance of the book historically and commercially.

For a time British authorities threatened Masterman with legal action, but in the end bowed to the inevitable and allowed publication, with the proviso that sixty passages in the manuscript be deleted. Kerr would only acquiesce to a dozen. The book, The Double-Cross System in the War of 1939–45, was finally published in February 1972, with a foreword by Pearson, who guardedly did not refer to his work in the committee. Masterman himself wrote the book without revealing anything about Ultra, still highly secret, that greatly aided the double-cross system. The ban on Ultra would be lifted in 1974.

== Published works ==
- An Oxford Tragedy, 1933 (mystery)
- Fate Cannot Harm Me, 1935
- Marshal Ney: A Play in Five Acts, 1937
- To Teach the Senators Wisdom, or, An Oxford Guide-Book, 1952
- The Case of the Four Friends, 1956
- Bits and Pieces, 1961
- The Double Cross System in the War of 1939 to 1945, Yale, 1972 (printed privately in 1945; reprint New York: The Lyons Press, 2000)
- On the Chariot Wheel: An Autobiography, Oxford, 1975.

== Death ==
On retiring from the Provostship, Masterman moved into a college-owned building on Beaumont Street, which he lived in until his death. He was cremated and his ashes were scattered on the lake of Worcester College.

== See also ==
- List of Vice-Chancellors of the University of Oxford

== Notes ==
Academic offices
Preceded by Francis John Lys	Provost of Worcester College, Oxford; 1947–1961	Succeeded by Oliver Franks, Baron Franks
Preceded by Alic Halford Smith	Vice-Chancellor of Oxford University; 1957–1958	Succeeded by T. S. R. Boase
