= Nathalie Sergueiew =

WWII double agent for MI5

Nathalie "Lily" Sergueiew
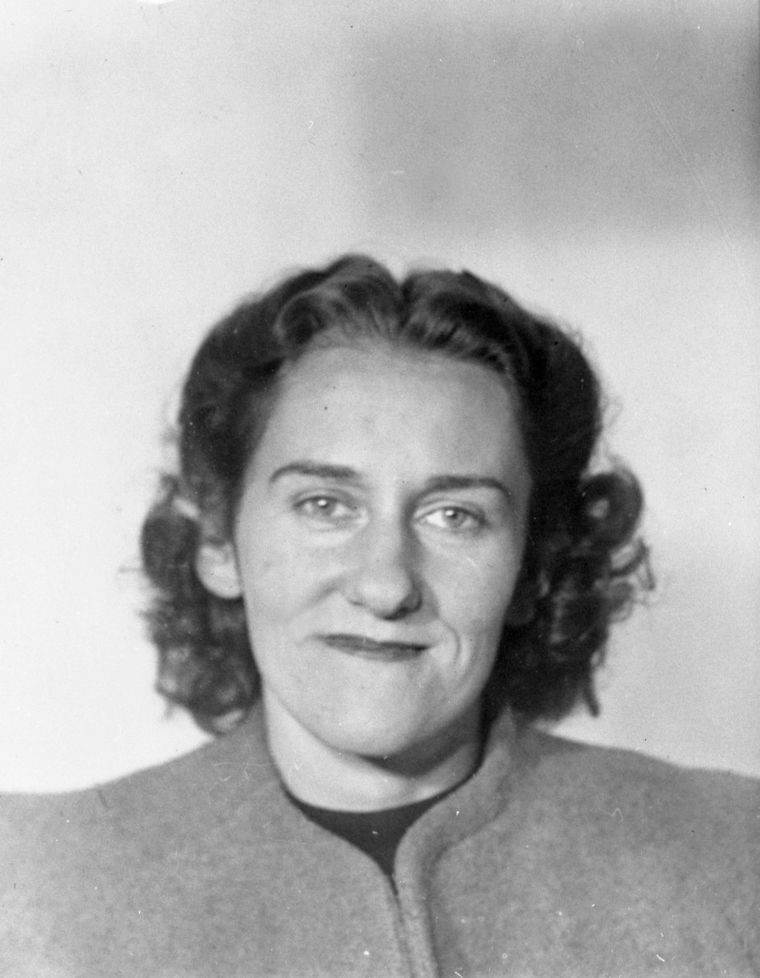
- Sergueiew between 1944 and 1946
- Born: 24 January 1912; Saint Petersburg, Russian Empire
- Died: 17 May 1950 (aged 38); Solon, Michigan, United States
- Citizenship: French
- Occupations: Journalist, spy
- Spouse: Bart Collings (m. 1945)

Nathalie "Lily" Sergueiew (January 24, 1912 – May 17, 1950) was a double agent who worked for MI5 during World War II under the codename "Treasure". She played a significant role in the Double-Cross System, particularly by deceiving the Germans about the location of the D-Day landings.

== Early life ==
Sergueiew was born in Saint Petersburg, Russian Empire (niece of General Yevgeny Miller), but her family fled to France following the Russian Revolution in 1917. She was educated in Paris, and trained as a journalist, being fluent in English, French and German. During the mid-1930s she travelled extensively throughout Germany, and once interviewed Hermann Göring.

== World War II ==
An attempt was made to recruit her by the German intelligence service in 1937, but she refused. However, after the Fall of France she offered to work for the Abwehr, with the aim of being sent to England, where she planned to betray the Nazis and – with luck – work for British Intelligence. Her Abwehr case officer, Major Emil Kliemann, trained her in intelligence gathering and communications techniques, and in 1943 sent her to Spain, along with her dog "Babs". Sergueiew promptly contacted the MI5 representative in Madrid and reported herself as a German spy and offered to work for British Intelligence. She was accepted, and travelled to England. However, British quarantine regulations resulted in Babs being left behind at Gibraltar.

Sergueiew was given the code-name "Treasure" and handled by MI5 officer Mary Sherer. "Treasure" turned out to be an effective agent, but was also described as "exceptionally temperamental and troublesome". Suffering from kidney stones and given only six months to live, she threatened to quit unless MI5 arranged for her dog to be brought her. Matters came to a head in February 1944 when "Treasure" learned that Babs (who was living with her sister in Algeria) had been run over. She informed MI5 that she had a secret signal, which would indicate to Kliemann that she was under British control, and threatened to use it in revenge for the death of her dog.

"Treasure" continued to work for MI5, sending the Germans false information until a week after D-Day, when she was informed that her services were no longer required. She accepted her discharge but warned them they would be unable to keep transmitting as her without her. After a tumultuous meeting with Colonel T. A. Robertson, head of the section responsible for control of the Double Cross agents, she eventually revealed the secret code. However, MI5 continued transmitting messages from her for another five months. Her long messages were re-encrypted by the Abwehr, using the German Enigma machines, and transmitted throughout the Abwehr's network. They provided Bletchley Park with excellent cribs for the cryptanalysis of the Enigma messages.

Sergueiew joined the Free French forces in England; after training, she returned to France as a liaison officer, working with Displaced Persons. Her last posting was to liaise with the US army officer in charge of the Erfurt area, including the infamous Buchenwald camp, Major John Barton ("Bart") Collings. After a year, he proposed to her and they married in Paris in August 1946.

== Later life and death ==
After the war Lily and her husband lived in a house they built in northwest Michigan; where Lily died in 1950 from kidney failure, and was buried in Solon Cemetery. Bart, who remained in their house, was laid beside her in 2012.

Lily wrote a revealing memoir, based on her secret diaries and notes from 1940 to 1945. These memoirs (with critical comments on her former MI5 employers) were eventually found by French writer and journalist Gilles Perrault and published in 1966, entitled Seule face à l'Abwehr ["Alone against the Abwehr"], (Paris: Librairie Arthème Fayard / Éditions J'ai Lu). An English translation, Secret Service Rendered, was published in 1968.
