= Latchmere House =

Building in London, England, used as a prison and now flats

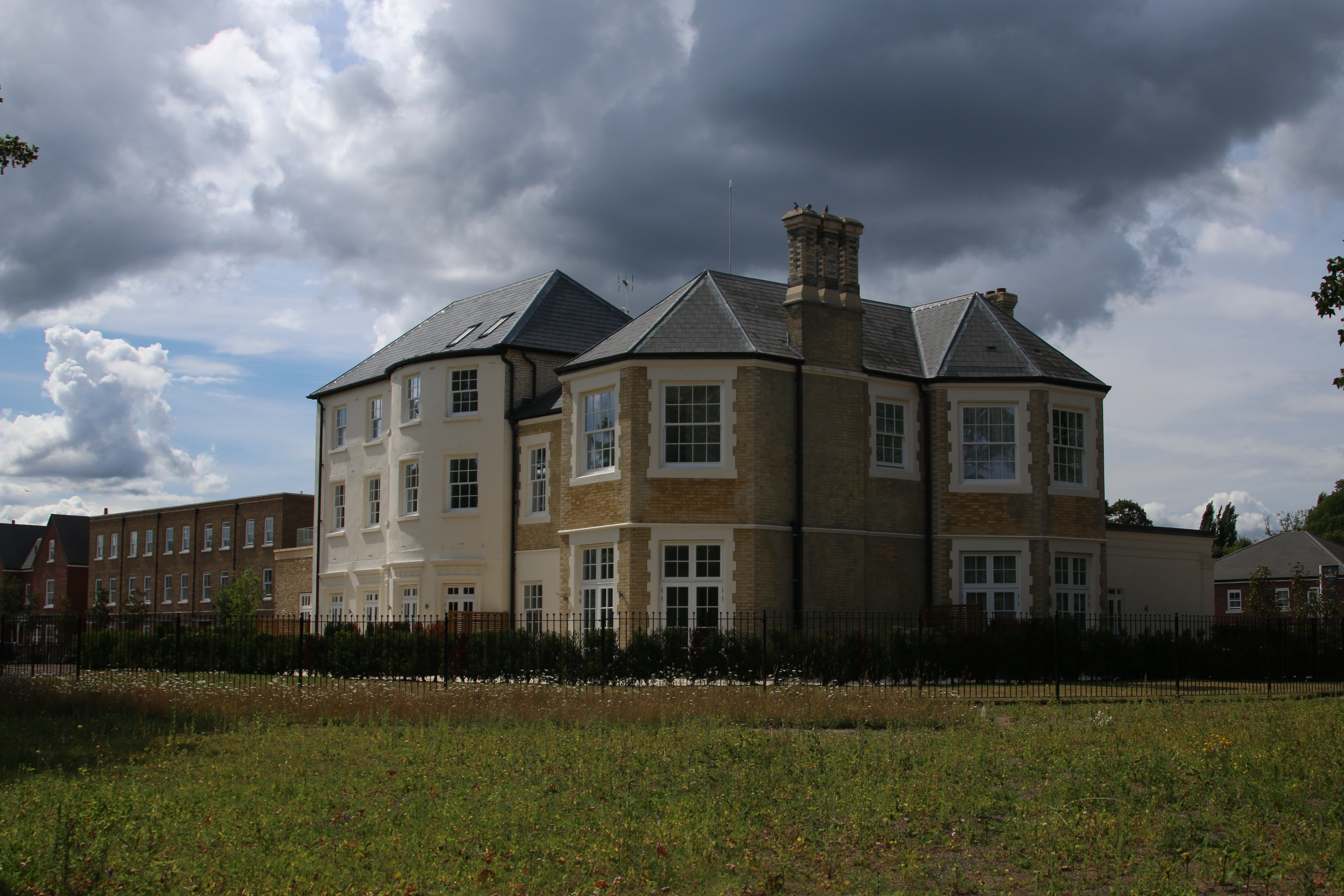
- The house, with some of the new homes, forming Barrons Chase, alongside
- Interactive map of the Latchmere House area

General information
- Status: (Conversion) apartments; and new homes in most of former grounds
- Type: Residential
- Architectural style: Victorian
- Location: Church Road, Ham Common, Ham, Richmond, TW10 5HH, Ham, London, England
- Coordinates: 51.4287°N 0.2960°W
- Elevation: 27 feet (8.2 m)
- Completed: 2020
- Client: Individual buyers
- Landlord: Flat owner-shared freehold company; many homes sold as freehold

Height
- Architectural: Georgian, English farmhouse-inspired and original, lightly crenulated Gothic Revival architecture
- Roof: Slate or flat

Technical details
- Floor count: 3

Design and construction
- Main contractor: Berkeley Homes
- Designations: Building of Townscape Merit

Website
- http://www.latchmerehouse.co.uk/

HMP Latchmere House
- Interactive map of HMP Latchmere House
- Status: Closed
- Security class: Male Cat. D
- Capacity: 207
- Opened: 1948
- Closed: September 2011

Latchmere House is a building and grounds southeast of Ham Common in Ham, in the London Borough of Richmond upon Thames, in south west London, England. The southern part of the site lies in the Royal Borough of Kingston upon Thames.

Originally built during the Victorian era as a private dwelling, the large house was later acquired by the War Office and had various uses until after World War II, when it was transferred to His Majesty's Prison Service; it served as a detention centre and prison until it was closed in September 2011. In 2013 the site was sold to Berkeley Homes who have converted the house into seven apartments and built further homes in the grounds.

== History ==
Built in the mid-19th century by Joshua Field, a British civil and mechanical engineer, as a large, ornate country house with large grounds. During the First World War (1914–1918) the estate was used by the War Office as a hospital for treating officers suffering from "shell shock".

During the Second World War it was a detention and interrogation centre (known as Camp 020) for enemy agents captured by MI5. Members of the British Union of Fascists (BUF) held there included the environmental pioneer Jorian Jenks. During August and September 1940 the local leaders – held without trial – were interrogated by military intelligence, including solitary confinement, mock executions, food deprivation and psychological torture. This ended when BUF leader Sir Oswald Mosley launched legal proceedings.

Britain sometimes used unusual methods of obtaining information from foreign internees and German prisoners of war. Across the estate 30 rooms were small cells with hidden microphones.

=== Latchmere House Prison ===
Latchmere House was transferred to His Majesty's Prison Service in 1948. It was used as a Young Offenders Institution (Ian Brady was detained there in the 1950s), remand centre, and finally a deportees' detention centre before becoming a Category D men's resettlement prison in 1992.

In December 2003 Her Majesty's Chief Inspector of Prisons praised this for its rehabilitation centre, employment opportunities for inmates, and the good relationships between staff and prisoners, but found that the prison could have done more to prepare prisoners for release. By the next summer the average prisoner spent 57.6 hours per week in Purposeful Activity, which made the prison "best in the country at providing useful work for its inmates." The prison also did well in diversity and in education, with less success in resettlement and drug use. All prisoners could find jobs nearby, with a return curfew of 11pm or earlier according to the type of employment.

In September 2011 the Ministry of Justice closed the prison on economic grounds.

== Post-2013 redevelopment ==
Latchmere House was sold to Berkeley Homes in 2013. The land adjoins Ham Common, and was considered prime real estate.

While English Heritage refused Richmond Borough Council's application for the main Victorian wing to be listed (statutorily recognised and protected for architecture or heritage), the planning authority has designated the house as a Building of Townscape Merit. Both Richmond and Kingston councils published a planning brief for the site, and conversion began in 2014. The house and its surrounds are in the Ham Common Conservation Area, and the planning brief sought to retain the house and related outbuildings and enhance the setting.

Permission was granted in July 2015 to redevelop the site by demolishing cellblocks and build 73 new homes, including 13 affordable ones, with a new road named Barrons Chase. All homes had been sold by late 2020.
