= Arthur Owens =

Welsh WWII double agent

Arthur Graham Owens, later known as Arthur Graham White (14 April 1899 – 24 December 1957), was a Welsh double agent for the Allies during the Second World War. He was working for MI5 while appearing to the Abwehr (the German intelligence agency) to be one of their agents. Owens was known to MI5 by the codename SNOW, which was chosen as a play on his last name.

== Recruitment by the British and the Germans ==
Owens ran a company that made batteries for ships. As such, he was a civilian contractor for the Royal Navy and also had regular contact with the Kriegsmarine in Kiel. His first experience of espionage occurred in 1936 when he had been briefly employed by the Secret Intelligence Service to provide information on what he had seen in the German shipyards.

In 1938, Nikolaus Ritter, an Abwehr agent in Britain under the name "Dr Rantzau", made contact with him. His work also provided a cover for any foreign trips he might have to make. He visited Germany that year and was recruited by the Abwehr. His Abwehr reference was A3504 and was given the codename JOHNNY, later to become Colonel Johnny.

=== Double dealing ===
On his return to Britain, Owens had second thoughts and, in September 1938, told the British authorities of his contact and that he was to receive a radio transceiver. Although he went to Germany to collect the radio, two weeks later he pretended it had arrived at the left luggage office of Victoria Station in London early in 1939; Owens turned the radio over and experts discovered it was more advanced than the British equivalent, before returning it to Owens.

On 11 August 1939, Owens visited his Abwehr controller in Hamburg with his girlfriend; during this visit, his wife, from whom he was separated, had written to his German contact denouncing him as a British spy. She also went to the British police to tell them he was a German agent. Despite this information, no action was taken by either side. The British police failed to pick him up on his return on 23 August and he used his radio to send several messages from London to Germany over the next week.

War between Britain and Germany broke out and, on 4 September, Owens made contact with the Special Branch to volunteer his services. However, he was instead interned in Wandsworth Prison under Defence Regulation 18B, as someone with hostile associations.

MI5 decided that Owens, to whom they gave the codename SNOW, could act as a double agent. On 12 September, MI5 returned the transmitter to Owens in Wandsworth, where it was listened to by a warder as Owens tried to make contact with the Germans. MI5 agreed to his release on condition he sent agreed messages to his German contacts. Released from prison and installed in a new property with his radio and girlfriend, Owens was helped in mid September to go to the Low Countries, where he met with German agents in Rotterdam and informed them of the Chain Home stations in England designed to detect incoming aircraft. He was asked, as a chemist, by the Germans if he could poison water reservoirs in England. Returning to England he began transmitting misleading British messages.

=== Activities ===
In the early months of the war, the Germans asked for regular weather reports from him for the use of the Luftwaffe and also to test his credibility; these were sent by radio. At another meeting in Belgium with the Abwehr, this time in Brussels, Owens was given £470 in cash (the value of a house) for the Chain Home information, and some detonators for use in sabotage. He had taken along another double agent, posing as a Welsh nationalist, who was instructed to start a postage stamp business so that the Germans could communicate through microdots on stamps.

A further meeting in December 1939 took place between Owens and Ritter of the Abwehr in Brussels where he was given more money and promised a salary of £250 per month. He would be sent explosives and a better radio. Owens told MI5 that the Germans had told him that the Phoney War would end in mid May, which proved accurate. The Germans believed Owens was their top agent in Britain.

MI5 was suspicious of Owens. When he chartered a fishing trawler from Grimsby, GY71, to meet with Ritter on the Dogger Bank in the North Sea, Owens took a second double agent, Sam McCarthy (codenamed BISCUIT) (who had been put in place by MI5 to test Owens), so that McCarthy could be trained in Germany. The meeting failed, and Owens was found to be in possession of a list of all key MI5 personnel (a 1939 menu card for a formal dinner of Intelligence personnel), arrested and threatened with execution as a traitor. The menu card was traced back to William Rolph, a disillusioned MI5 officer, who then committed suicide. A second attempt at a Dogger Bank meeting, this time controlled by MI5, also failed. Ritter in a Dornier Do 18 flying boat failed to find the trawler.

MI5 believed that Owens was primarily interested in making money from both sides and that probably neither side trusted him entirely. Owens was permitted to continue radio transmissions to Germany, but MI5 tried to make sure that Owens only passed on to the Germans the information that they had given him. Transmissions were now being made by Maurice Burton, an ex-prison warder who had been looking after Owens in Wandsworth and had adopted Owens' style of transmitting. Ritter still believed in Owens but was feeding him with misinformation about the planned invasion of Britain, at the same time as Owens was sending misinformation to Germany about the bombing of Britain.

=== Involvement with other spies ===
In August 1940, McCarthy (who was working for MI5) went to Portugal and met Ritter, handing over certain "modified" documents, such as ration cards and receiving in return a new radio and £950. The meeting, set up by Owens, boosted Owens' position in German eyes. One of the most important pieces of fake information then sent by radio to Germany was the supplying of false names and ration book numbers; these were used on fake documents for Abwehr agents who were sent into Britain.

Owens helped deliver German spies to MI5, who were then given the choice of becoming double agents or facing a hangman or the firing squad. Most chose to work for Britain, becoming double agents themselves and delivering vital information to the Allies, including details about troop movements and the keys to cracking German codes.

The German agents were part of their Operation LENA, the infiltration of agents into Britain to discover British coastal defences prior to Operation Sea Lion, the invasion of Britain. One parachuted German agent, a Swedish national Gösta Caroli, was captured, agreed to be a double agent and sent a message saying he was hurt on landing. The Germans asked Owens to meet the agent and help him. As a result, Owens' status increased further in German eyes.

During the bombing of London, Owens was moved by MI5 to Addlestone in Surrey where he lived in style on his £250 per month German salary with his girlfriend Lily Bade and their newly born baby.

In February 1941, Owens was permitted to fly to Portugal to meet Ritter, accompanied by Walter Dicketts, an ex RNAS officer who had worked in Air Intelligence during the previous war and had since served several prison sentences for fraud. Unable to trust Owens, MI5 had instructed Dicketts to verify Owens' bona fides and get himself infiltrated into Owens’ network, where he could be run as a separate, and if necessary, alternative source of information. Dicketts was instructed by Tar Robertson, head of the double agent section in MI5, to take his WW1 Staff Appointment with the Air Ministry to prove his value to the Germans, and to try and get himself taken into Germany for training. Ritter invited Dicketts to come to Hamburg for interrogation by experts from the Abwehr, which Dicketts accepted and was escorted through Spain and France into Germany. Ritter refused to allow Owens to accompany Dicketts and he was forced to remain behind in Lisbon. Using material provided to him by MI5, Dicketts managed to convince the Germans he was a traitor willing to betray his country for cash and to help end the war and was accepted as a German agent. Ritter instructed Dicketts to purchase a boat when he returned to England, so he could ferry German spies and sabotage equipment from the Nazi occupied Channel Islands into England.

Three weeks later, Dicketts was reunited with Owens in Lisbon and both flew back to England in late March, when Owens was found to be carrying £10,000 and explosive pens. Owens claimed to have informed Dicketts before he even went into Germany, that Owens had told Ritter that both he and Dicketts were working for MI5, a fact which Dicketts strenuously denied. Owens viewed the fact that Dicketts had nonetheless gone willingly into Germany as proof that he had been 'turned' by the Germans. MI5 spent countless hours interrogating each agent, and in the end Dicketts' account was believed by some in MI5, and not by others. Owens was imprisoned until the end of the war for having endangered Dicketts' life and for having revealed secret information that his pre-war German radio transmitter was being operated by MI5.

The collapse of the Snow network ended the careers of double agents, Snow, Charlie, GW, Biscuit, Summer and Celery, although GW was able to re-establish himself through another network. Dicketts continued to work as an agent for MI5 until 1943, undertaking a further mission to Lisbon to help an Abwehr officer defect, and spent six months in South America until March 1942.

A German agent, Willem Ter Braak, had landed in November 1940 and successfully obtained accommodation and rented an office. He was not picked up by the police despite having ration cards with false numbers; however, suspecting he was being watched, he committed suicide on 1 April 1941. This led to a suspicion of a parallel German network to the Owens agents. Owens was arrested and found himself in prison, where he was joined by Rudolf Hess, Hitler's Deputy Fuhrer, recently landed in Scotland and seeking a peace deal, possibly encouraged to do so by the false messages Owens had been sending. Dicketts was sent back to Portugal, where the Germans concluded he had not been turned as a double agent. With neither the Germans nor the British believing Owens was on their side, his career was over. The Germans had paid him at least £13,850, worth over £1m in today's terms.

== Later life ==
MI5 used Owens' radio to inform the Germans that he was seriously ill, while interning Owens in Dartmoor Prison until the end of the war. In Dartmoor, Owens stayed in the hospital wing, which was termed Camp 001 for internees. While in prison, Owens continued to work for the British by befriending German inmates and feeding what he learned to MI5.

In 1939, Owens' son from his marriage, now 21 and possibly acting on his father's instructions, tried to get his father out of prison; when he bragged about sketching airfields and sending the information to Hamburg he was arrested and imprisoned. Owens' girlfriend Lily Bade married a local man and settled down with Owens' child.

On his release in May 1945, Owens signed the Official Secrets Act and was given £500 by MI5. Owens, now with the surname White, moved in 1948 to Ireland with a new wife and a new baby and settled in Harristown, County Dublin, where he died in 1957.

His daughter, Patricia Owens, was an actress best known for her starring role in the 1958 science-fiction horror film The Fly.

== See also ==
- Double-Cross System
