= Wulf Schmidt =

Double agent

- Born: 7 December 1911; Apenrade, Prussia, Germany
- Died: 19 October 1992 (aged 80); Watford, Hertfordshire, England
- Occupation: Agriculturalist (plantation foreman)
- Awards: Iron Cross (First & Second Class)
- Espionage activity
- Allegiance: Germany (nominal) Britain (actual)
- Service years: 1940–1945
- Codename: TATE (British)
- Codename: LEONHARDT (German)

Wulf Dietrich Christian Schmidt, later known as Harry Williamson (7 December 1911 – 19 October 1992) was a Danish citizen who became a double agent working for Britain against Nazi Germany during the Second World War under the codename Tate. He was part of the Double Cross System, under which all German agents in Britain were controlled by MI5 and used to deceive Germany. Nigel West singled him out as "one of the seven spies who changed the world."

== Career as a double agent ==
Schmidt was sent to Britain by the Abwehr on the evening of 19 September 1940, landing by parachute near Willingham, Cambridgeshire. He ate breakfast in a village cafe, and had struggled with currency, alerting the Home Guard.

He was arrested immediately, as a captured agent had divulged the time of his arrival in return for a promise that Schmidt, a friend, would not be executed. Schmidt broke down under interrogation and became a double agent, making contact with Germany by radio in October 1940. He was one of the longest running agents in the Double Cross System; his last contact with Germany was on 2 May 1945. He operated his radio himself until he became ill and had to be imitated by a British operator. Although he recovered from his illness, he was not allowed to operate the radio thereafter. He continued to assist in composing the messages sent to Germany.

Tate participated in many deception and counter-intelligence operations. As a working agent, he needed money. In the spring of 1941, the Germans sent over Karel Richter to deliver money but Richter was quickly captured by the British. In desperation, the Germans used a Japanese diplomat to take funds to Tate, which revealed the extent of German-Japanese co-operation. In July 1941, the Abwehr sent £20,000 to Britain, which Tate received. With this huge sum (approximately equivalent to £870,000 in 2025), Tate notionally established himself as a rich "man about town" in London, with easy access to black-market liquor and other luxuries. As such, he could plausibly make friends with military officers and civilian officials and get intelligence from their loose talk or even recruit them as agents.

Tate reported to the Germans that to avoid military service, he was employed on a farm owned by a friend and could only visit London on weekends. This provided an excuse for his not recruiting more agents or reporting as much as the Germans wanted. Tate participated in the Operation Bodyguard deception which covered the Invasion of Normandy. He notionally went to work on a farm near Wye in south-east England, where the fictional First United States Army Group (FUSAG) was located. Tate provided the Germans with fake schedules for the rail transport of FUSAG troops to ports of embarkation for the invasion. This apparent feat was highly regarded in Germany. For this and his other apparent successes, Tate was granted naturalisation as a German citizen so that he could receive the Iron Cross First and Second Class.

In the meantime, Schmidt lived quietly in England, at Roundbush House, in Radlett in Hertfordshire, to live with Scottish intelligence officer, T. A. Robertson, and his wife Joan and daughter Belinda. He found employment as a photographer at Greville Studios in Watford. By 1945, he had even been registered to vote in the general election. Tate's last deception was in early 1945. German submarines ("U-boats") running submerged or with only the snorkel up could not use normal navigation methods. The U-boats fixed their positions off southern Ireland, where there was a distinctive conical seamount. Using the depth sounder, a submarine could locate the peak of the seamount, which was a known position. Rodger Winn, head of the U-Boat Tracking Room, suspected this and suggested laying a minefield at that spot. No minelayer was available, so he approached the Double Cross team, and suggested telling the Germans through a controlled agent that there was a minefield.

Tate was chosen, as one of his notional friends was a Royal Navy officer who was a minelaying expert. Tate reported that his "mine-laying friend" had bragged to him about a new minefield near Ireland, with clues that should have alerted the Germans but nothing seemed to happen. Then, by coincidence, a U-boat was reported sunk off Ireland. Tate reported that his "mine-laying friend" had come by to celebrate this success. Tate added that he was angry and ready to quit: he had risked his life for this intelligence and a U-boat was lost because the Germans had not acted on it. Two days later, the German Navy (Kriegsmarine) ordered its U-boats to avoid a sixty-square-mile (160 km^{2}) zone around the seamount, forfeiting the navigation fix and also providing a safe zone for Allied ships.

== Personal life ==
He died in Hertfordshire in October 1992.
