= Gösta Caroli =

MI5 double agent (1902–1975)

Gösta Caroli (6 November 1902 – 8 May 1975) was a double agent working for MI5 during the Second World War under the codename SUMMER.

Gösta Caroli and Wulf Schmidt (a Danish citizen) landed, via parachute, in September 1940. The two were genuine Nazis, had trained together and were friends. Caroli was coerced into turning double in return for Schmidt's life being spared, whilst Schmidt was told that Caroli had sold him out, and in anger swapped sides.

Caroli quickly became a problem; he attempted to strangle his MI5 handler before making an escape carrying a canoe, on a motorcycle. He vaguely planned to row to the Netherlands, but came unstuck after falling off the bike in front of a policeman. He was eventually recaptured and judged too much trouble to be used. Caroli spent the rest of the war in a British internment camp. Schmidt was more of a success. Codenamed 'Tate', he continued to contact Germany, until May 1945.
