= T. A. Robertson =

Scottish MI5 intelligence officer

Thomas Argyll Robertson OBE (27 October 1909 – 10 May 1994), known as "Tommy" or by his initials as "TAR", was a Scottish MI5 intelligence officer who headed MI5's B1(a) section during the Second World War a critical component of the "Double-Cross" ("XX") disinformation campaign against the German intelligence services, by using a network of controlled double agents. These agents would be critical in the success of Allied strategic deception, such as Operation Fortitude and Operation Mincemeat. The disinformation campaigns were successful in persuading the Germans that the invasions of Sicily (1943) and Normandy (D-Day) (6 June 1944) were going to occur elsewhere.

Earlier in 1936, Robertson oversaw the interception of telephone calls of Edward VIII, in which capacity he was the first to learn of the king's decision to abdicate.

He was educated at Charterhouse School and Royal Military Academy, Sandhurst. In 1929 he was commissioned into Seaforth Highlanders; and joined MI5 in the 1930s. On 2 June 1944 he was awarded the OBE for his war service.
