= Duquesne Spy Ring =

Nazi German spy ring in the U.S. during World War II

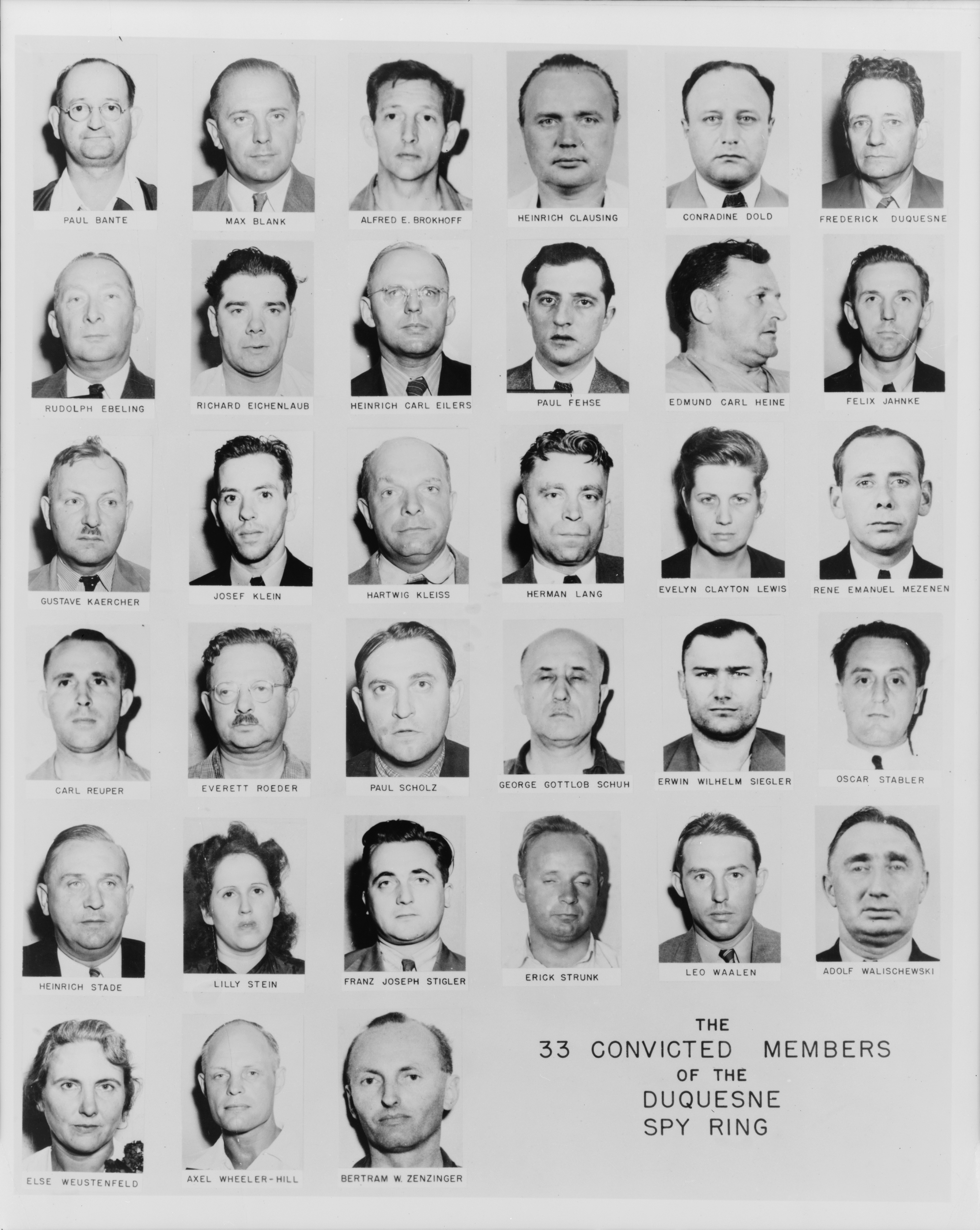
The 33 convicted members of the Duquesne spy ring (FBI print)

The Duquesne Spy Ring is the largest espionage case in the United States history that ended in convictions. A total of 33 members of a Nazi German espionage network, headed by Frederick "Fritz" Duquesne, were convicted after a lengthy investigation by the Federal Bureau of Investigation (FBI). Of those indicted, 19 pleaded guilty. The remaining 14 were brought to jury trial in Federal District Court, Brooklyn, New York, on September 3, 1941; all were found guilty on December 13, 1941. On January 2, 1942, the group members were sentenced to serve a total of over 300 years in prison.

The agents who formed the Duquesne Ring were placed in key jobs in the United States to get information that could be used in the event of war and to carry out acts of sabotage: one opened a restaurant and used his position to get information from his customers; another worked on an airline so that he could report Allied ships that were crossing the Atlantic Ocean; others worked as delivery people as a cover for carrying secret messages.

William G. Sebold, who had been blackmailed into becoming a spy for Germany, became a double agent and helped the FBI gather evidence. For nearly two years, the FBI ran a shortwave radio station in New York for the ring. They learned what information Germany was sending its spies in the United States and controlled what was sent to Germany. Sebold's success as a counterespionage agent was demonstrated by the successful prosecution of the German agents.

One German spymaster later commented the ring's roundup delivered "the death blow" to their espionage efforts in the United States. FBI director J. Edgar Hoover called his concerted FBI swoop on Duquesne's ring the greatest spy roundup in U.S. history.

The 1945 film The House on 92nd Street was a thinly disguised version of the Duquesne Spy Ring saga of 1941.

== FBI agents ==
=== William Sebold (double-agent) ===
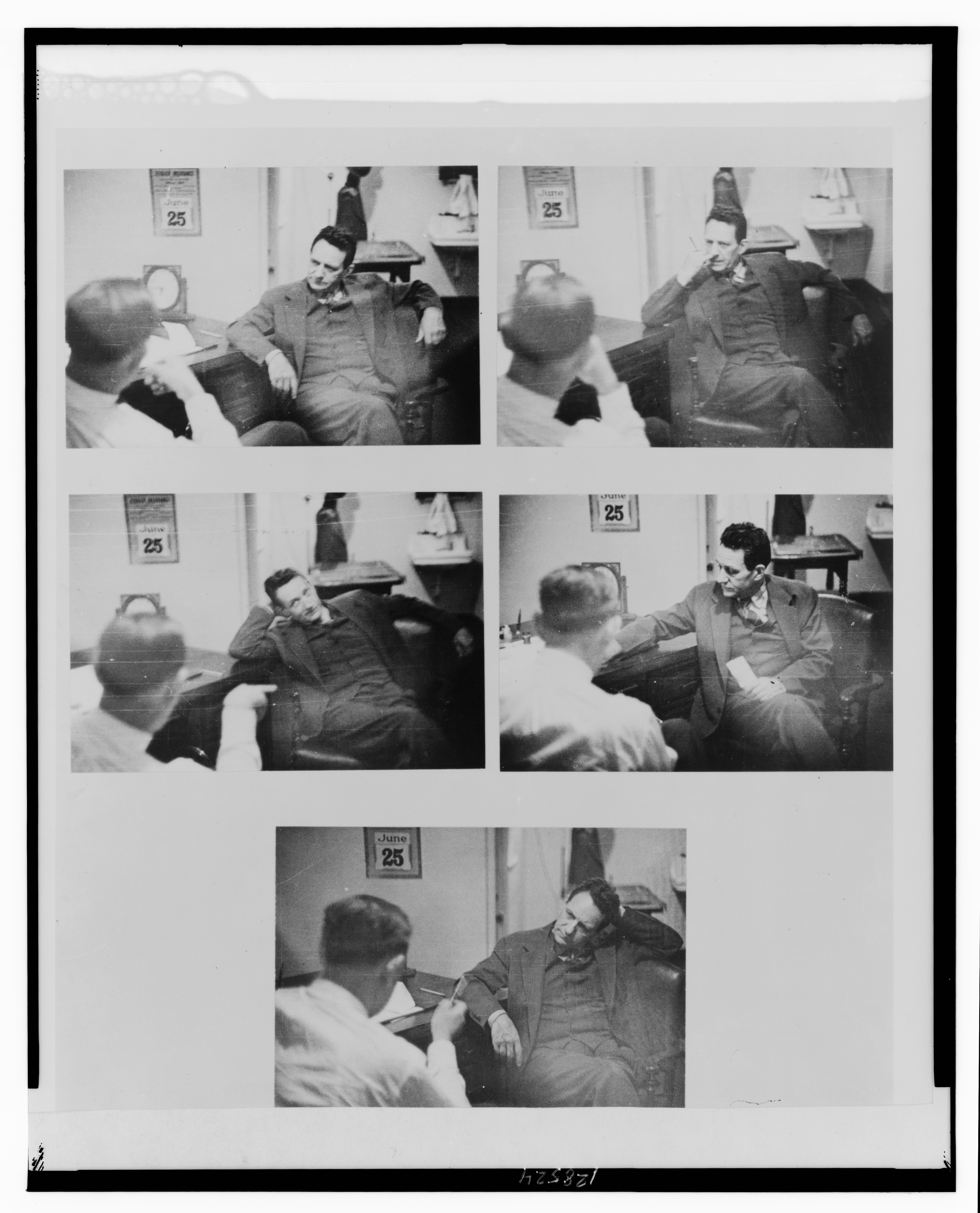
Duquesne in the office of Harry Sawyer (aka William Sebold), FBI, June 25, 1941

After the Duquesne Spy Ring convictions, Sebold was provided with a new identity and started a chicken farm in California.

Impoverished and delusional, he was committed to Napa State Hospital in 1965. Diagnosed with manic-depression, he died there of a heart attack five years later at 70. His life story as a double agent was first told in the 1943 book Passport to Treason: The Inside Story of Spies in America by Alan Hynd.

=== James Ellsworth ===
Special Agent Jim Ellsworth was assigned as Sebold's handler or body man, responsible for shadowing his every move during the 16-month investigation.

=== William Gustav Friedemann ===
William Gustav Friedemann was a principal witness in the Duquesne case. He began working for the FBI as a fingerprint analyst in 1935 and later became an agent after identifying a crucial fingerprint in a kidnapping case.

After World War II, he was assigned to Puerto Rico, where he pinpointed the group behind the assassination attempt on President Harry Truman. Friedemann died of cancer on August 23, 1989, in Stillwater, Oklahoma.

== Convicted members of Duquesne Spy Ring ==
=== Fritz Duquesne ===
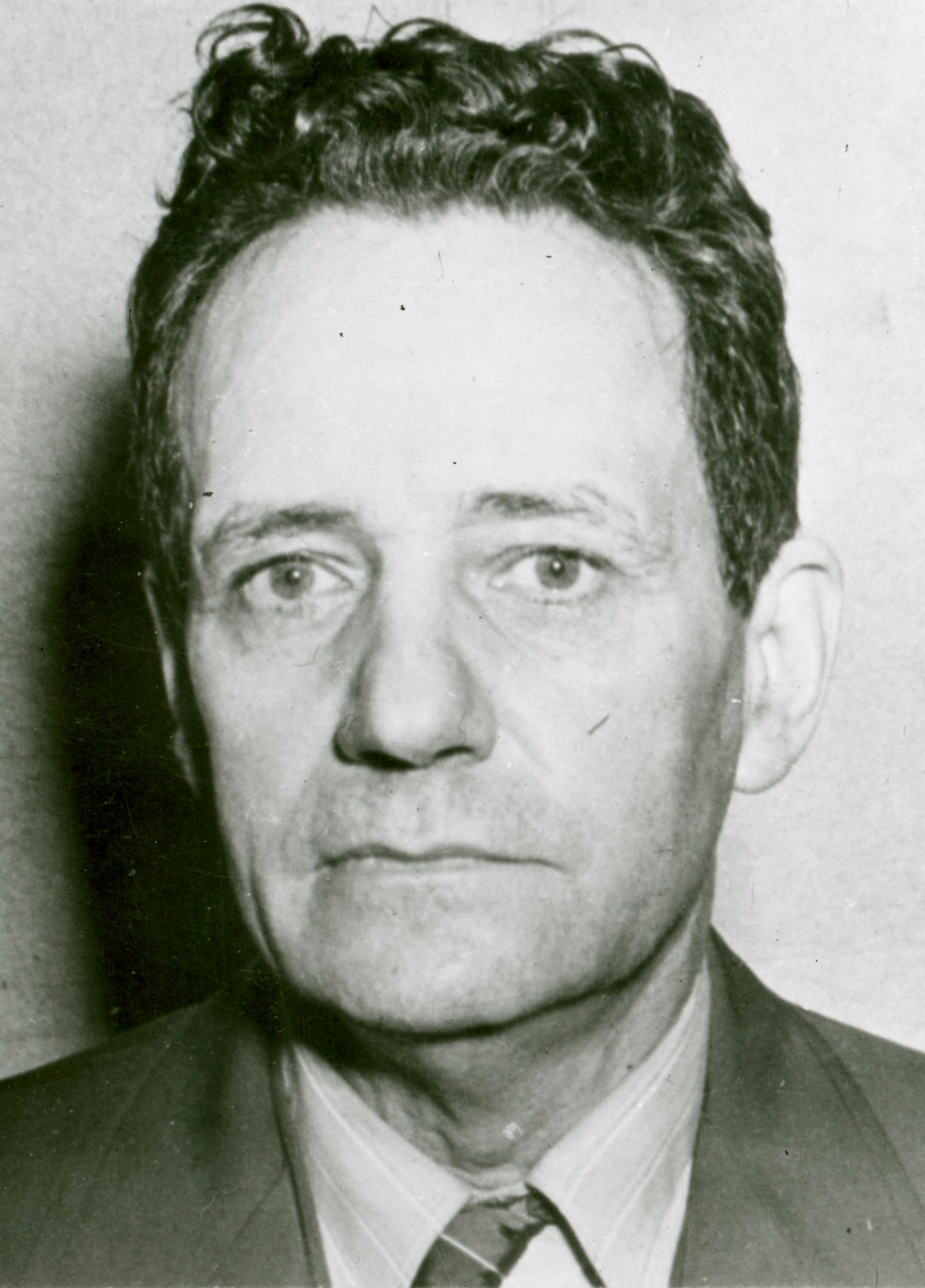

Born in Cape Colony, South Africa, on September 21, 1877, and a naturalized citizen of the United States in 1913, Fritz Joubert Duquesne was a captain in the Second Boer War and later a colonel in the Abwehr, Germany's division of military intelligence.

Duquesne was captured and imprisoned three times by the British, once by the Portuguese, and once by the Americans in 1917, and each time he escaped. In World War I, he was a spy and ring leader for Germany and during this time he sabotaged British merchant ships in South America with concealed bombs and destroyed several. Duquesne was also ordered to assassinate an American, Frederick Russell Burnham, Chief of Scouts for the British Army, but failed to do so. He was known as "The man who killed Kitchener" since he claimed to have sabotaged and sunk HMS Hampshire, on which Lord Kitchener was en route to Russia in 1916.

In the spring of 1934, Duquesne became an intelligence officer for the Order of 76, an American pro-Nazi organization, and in January 1935 he began working for U.S. government's Works Progress Administration. Admiral Wilhelm Canaris, head of the Abwehr, knew Duquesne from his work in World War I and he instructed his new chief of operations in the U.S., Col. Nikolaus Ritter, to make contact. Ritter had been friends with Duquesne back in 1931 and the two spies reconnected in New York on December 3, 1937.

On February 8, 1940, Ritter sent Sebold, under the alias of Harry Sawyer, to New York and instructed him to set up a shortwave radio-transmitting station and to contact Duquesne, code-named DUNN.

Once the FBI discovered through Sebold that Duquesne was again in New York operating as a German spy, director J. Edgar Hoover provided a background briefing to President Franklin Roosevelt. FBI agent Raymond Newkirk, using the name Ray McManus, was now assigned to DUNN and he rented a room immediately above Duquesne's apartment near Central Park and used a hidden microphone to record Duquesne's conversations. But monitoring Duquesne's activities proved to be difficult. As Newkirk described it, "The Duke had been a spy all of his life and automatically used all of the tricks in the book to avoid anyone following him...He would take a local train, change to an express, change back to a local, go through a revolving door and keep going on right around, take an elevator up a floor, get off, walk back to the ground, and take off in a different entrance of the building." Duquesne also informed Sebold that he was certain he was under surveillance, and he even confronted one FBI agent and demanded that he stop tracking him, a story confirmed by agent Newkirk.

In a letter to the Chemical Warfare Service in Washington, D.C., Duquesne requested information on a new gas mask. He identified himself as a "well-known, responsible and reputable writer and lecturer." At the bottom of the letter, he wrote, "Don't be concerned if this information is confidential, because it will be in the hands of a good, patriotic citizen." A short time later, the information he requested arrived in the mail and a week later it was being read by intelligence officers in Berlin.

Duquesne was found guilty of espionage and sentenced to 18 years in prison. He received a concurrent two-year sentence and was fined $2,000 for violating the Foreign Agents Registration Act. Duquesne served his sentence in Leavenworth Federal Penitentiary in Kansas, where he was mistreated and beaten by other inmates. In 1954, he was released due to ill health, having served fourteen years, and died indigent, at City Hospital on Welfare Island (now Roosevelt Island), New York City, on May 24, 1956, at the age of 78.

=== Paul Bante ===
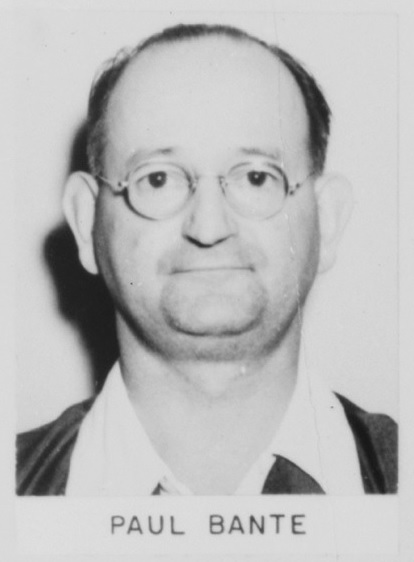

Born in Germany, Paul Bante served in the German Army during the First World War. In 1930 he came to the United States, where he was naturalized in 1938. Bante, a former member of the German American Bund, claimed that he was brought into contact with agent Paul Fehse because of his ties to Ignatz Theodor Griebl. Before he fled the United States for Germany, Griebl was accused of belonging to a Nazi spy ring along with Rumrich spy ring. Bante helped Fehse to obtain information about ships leaving for Great Britain loaded with war supplies. As a Gestapo agent, he was supposed to cause discontent amongst trade unionists. Sebold met Bante at the Little Casino Restaurant, which was frequently used by the ring's members. During one of these meetings, Bante talked about making a bomb detonator, after which he later gave dynamite and detonators to Sebold.

Bante pleaded guilty to violating the Registration Act. He was sentenced to 18 months in prison and fined $1,000.

=== Max Blank ===
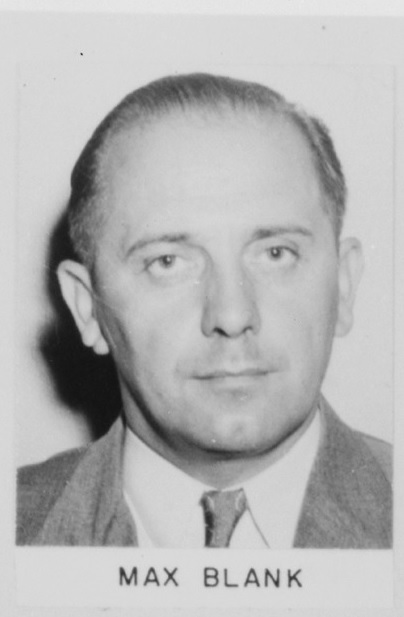

Blank came to the United States from Germany in 1928. While he never became a U.S. citizen, he'd been employed at a German library. Blank boasted to agent Sebold that he had been in the espionage business since 1936, but lost interest in recent years since payments from Germany had fallen off.

Blank pleaded guilty to violating the Registration Act. He was sentenced 18 months in prison and fined $1,000.

=== Heinrich Clausing ===
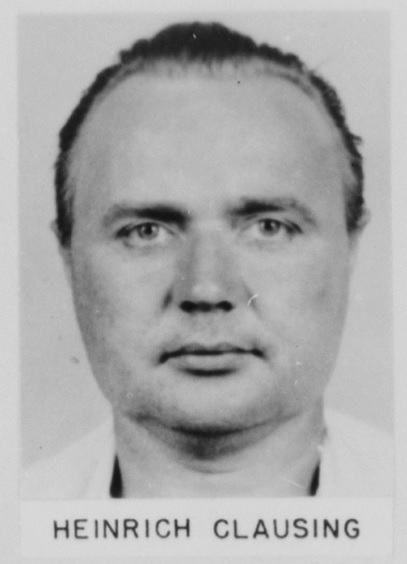

In September 1934, German-born Heinrich Clausing came to the United States, where he became a naturalized citizen in 1938. Around 1938, Heine was recruited to find American automobile and aviation industry secrets that could be passed to Germany through the Duquesne Spy Ring. Later it was discovered that Heine was also the mysterious "Heinrich" who supplied the spy ring with aerial photographs.

After obtaining technical books relating to magnesium and aluminum alloys, Heine sent the materials to Heinrich Eilers. To ensure safe delivery of the books to Germany in case they did not reach Eilers, Heine indicated the return address on the package as the address of Lilly Stein.

Clausing pleaded guilty to espionage and was sentenced to 8 years in prison. He also received a two-year concurrent sentence and was fined $5,000 for violating of the Registration Act.

=== Paul Fehse ===
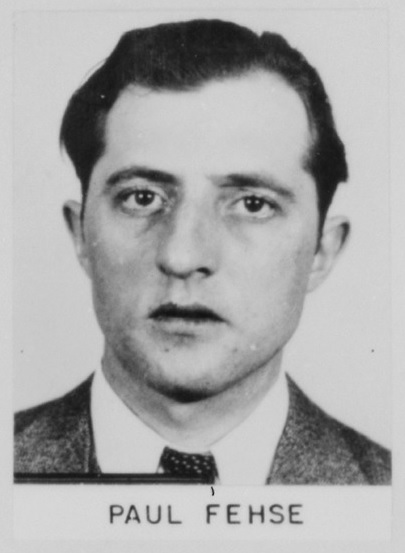

In 1934, Fehse left Germany for the United States, where he was naturalized in 1938. Since emigrating, he'd been employed as a cook aboard ships sailing from the New York Harbor. Fehse was one of the leading forces in the spy ring. He arranged meetings, directed members’ activities, correlated information that had been developed, and arranged for its transmittal to Germany, chiefly through Sebold. Fehse, who was trained for espionage work in Hamburg, claimed he headed the Marine Division of the Nazi espionage system in the United States.

Having become nervous, Fehse made plans to leave the country. He obtained a position on the SS Siboney, which was scheduled to sail from Hoboken, New Jersey, for Lisbon, on March 29, 1941. He planned to desert ship in Lisbon and return to Germany. However, before he could leave, Fehse was arrested by the FBI. Upon his arrest, he admitted sending letters to Italy for transmittal to Germany, as well as reporting the movements of British ships. Fehse pleaded guilty to violating the Registration Act and was sentenced to one year and one day in prison. He later pleaded guilty to espionage and was sentenced to 15 years in prison.

=== Gustav Wilhelm Kärcher ===
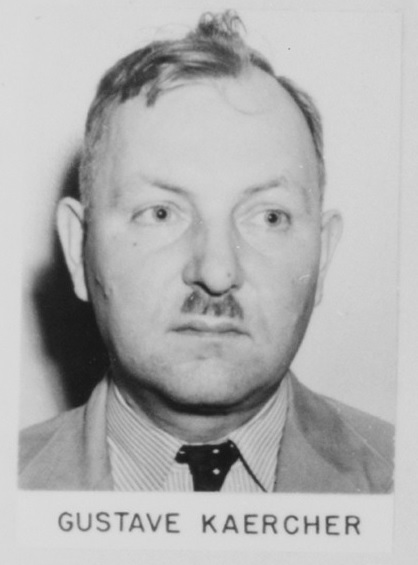

Kärcher emigrated from Germany to the United States in 1923, and was naturalized in 1931. He served in the German Army during World War I, and was a former leader of the German American Bund in New York. During visits to Germany, Kärcher was seen wearing a German Army officer’s uniform. At the time of his arrest, he was engaged in designing power plants for a gas and electricity company in New York City. Kärcher was arrested with Paul Scholz, who'd just given Kärcher a table of call letters and frequencies for transmitting information to Germany by radio.

After pleading guilty to violating the Registration Act, Kärcher was sentenced to 22 months in prison and fined $2,000.

=== Hermann W. Lang ===
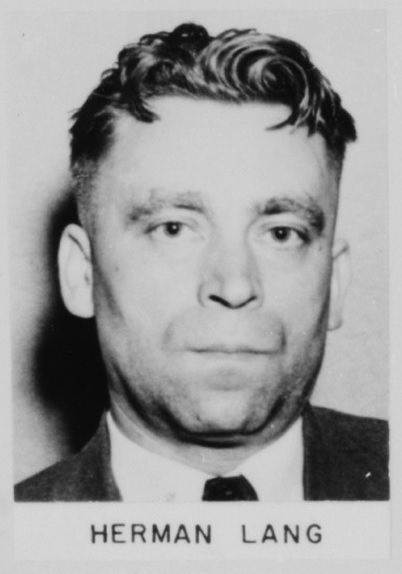

Hermann W. Lang (Sometimes spelled Herman in US media) had participated in the Beer Hall Putsch in 1923. He immigrated to the United States in 1927.

Until his arrest, machinist and draftsman Lang had been employed as an assembly inspector by the Carl L. Norden Corp., which manufactured the top secret Norden bombsight. In October 1937 he met Ritter and told him he had overnight access to classified drawings and used it to copy them in his kitchen at home while his family was asleep. He then hid the plans in a wooden casing for an umbrella, and, on January 9, 1938, personally handed the umbrella off to a German steward and secret courier on the ship SS Reliance bound for Bremen. For that he received $1500. However, he could not copy all the plans, and Ritter had to invite him to Germany in order to complete a model, where he was received by Hermann Göring himself.

The Norden bombsight had been considered a critical wartime instrument by the United States Army Air Forces, and American bombardiers were required to take an oath during their training stating that they would defend its secret with their own life, if needed. The Lotfernrohr 3 and the BZG 2 in 1942 used a similar set of gyroscopes that provided a stabilized platform for the bombardier to sight through, although the more complex interaction between the bombsight and autopilot was not used. Later in the war, Luftwaffe bombers used the Carl Zeiss Lotfernrohr 7, or Lotfe 7, which had an advanced mechanical system similar to the Norden bombsight, but was much simpler to operate and maintain. At one point, Sebold was ordered to contact Lang as it became known that the technology he had stolen from Norden was being used in German bombers. The Nazis offered to spirit him to safety in Germany, but Lang refused to leave his home in Ridgewood, Queens.

Upon conviction, Lang was sentenced to 18 years in prison on espionage charges and a concurrent two-year term under the Registration Act. He was released and deported to Germany in September 1950.

=== Evelyn Clayton Lewis ===
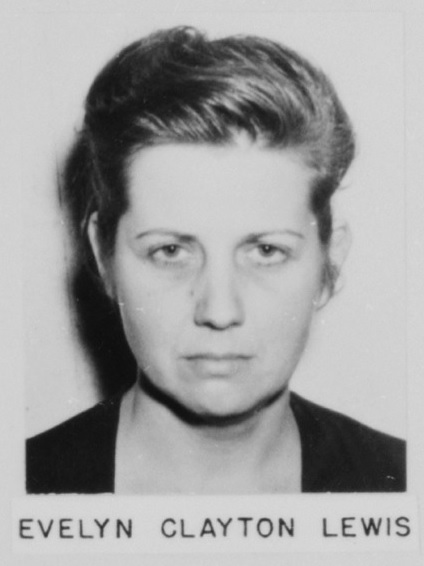

A native of Arkansas, Evelyn Clayton Lewis had been living with Duquesne in New York City. Lewis had expressed her anti-British and antisemitic feelings during her relationship with Duquesne. She was aware of his espionage activities and condoned them. While she was not active in obtaining information for Germany, she helped Duquesne prepare material for transmittal abroad. After pleading guilty, Lewis was sentenced to serve one year and one day in prison for violating the Registration Act.

=== Rene Emanuel Mezenen ===
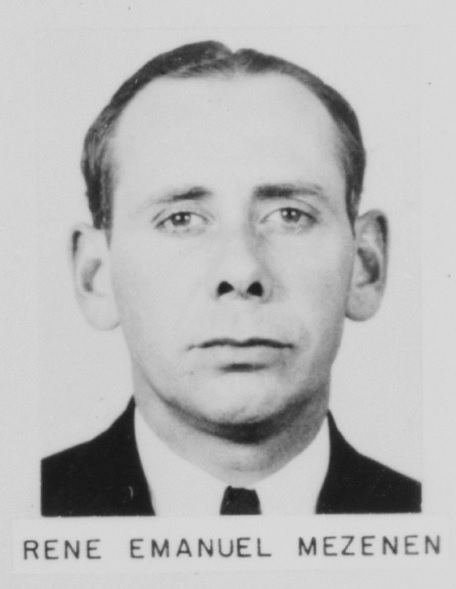

Rene Emanuel Mezenen, a Frenchman, claimed U.S. citizenship through the naturalization of his father. Prior to his arrest, he was employed as a steward in the Pan American transatlantic clipper service.

The German Intelligence Service in Lisbon, Portugal, asked Mezenen to act as a courier, transmitting information between the United States and Portugal on his regular commercial aircraft trips. As a steward he was able to deliver documents from New York to Lisbon in 24 hours. He accepted this offer for financial gain. In the course of flights across the Atlantic, Mezenen reported his observance of convoys sailing for England. He also became involved in smuggling platinum from the United States to Portugal. When discussing his courier role with agent Sebold, Mezenen boasted that he hid the spy letters so well that if they were found it would have taken two to three weeks to repair the airplane.

After pleading guilty, Mezenen was sentenced to 8 years in prison for espionage. He received a concurrent two-year sentence for violating the Registration Act.

=== Carl Reuper ===
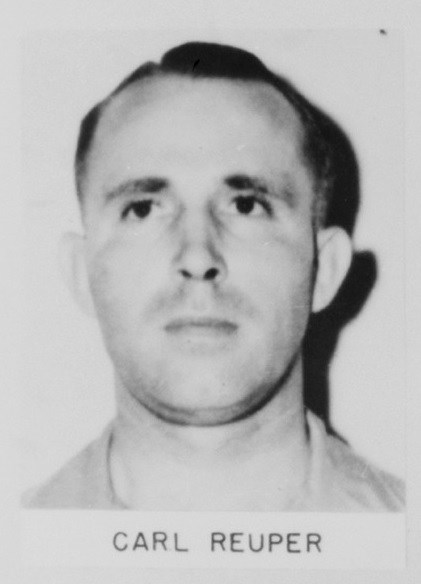

Having come to the United States from Germany in 1929, Carl Reuper became a citizen in 1936. Prior to his arrest, he served as an inspector for the Westinghouse Electric Company in Newark, New Jersey. Previously, he worked as a mechanic for the Air Associates Company in Bendix, New Jersey.

Reuper obtained photographs for Germany relating to national defense materials and construction, which he obtained from his employment. He arranged radio contact with Germany through the station established by Felix Jahnke. On one occasion, he conferred with Sebold regarding the latter's facilities for communicating with German authorities. After being convicted at trial, Reuper was sentenced to 16 years in prison on espionage charges and received a concurrent two-year sentence under the Registration Act.

=== Everett Minster Roeder ===
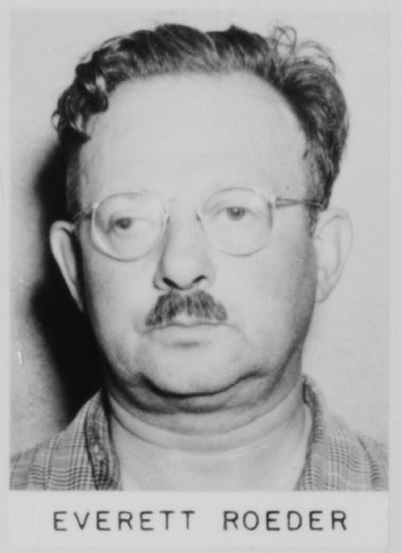

Born in the Bronx, New York, Everett Minster Roeder was the son of a celebrated piano instructor, Carl Roeder. A child prodigy, when he was 15 years old he enrolled in engineering at Cornell University and there he met the brothers Edward and Elmer Sperry; however he dropped out of school when he was 18 and married his pregnant girlfriend. He was one of the first employees at the Sperry Gyroscope Company where he worked as an engineer and designer of confidential materials for the U.S. Army and Navy. In his job as a gyroscope expert working on U.S. military contracts, Roeder built machines such as tracking devices for long-range guns capable of hitting moving targets 10 mi (16 km) away, aircraft autopilot and blind-flying systems, ship stabilizers, and anti-aircraft search lights.

Sebold had delivered microphotograph instructions to Roeder, as ordered by German authorities. Roeder and Sebold met in public places and proceeded to spots where they could talk privately. In 1936, Roeder had visited Germany and was requested by German authorities to act as an espionage agent. Primarily due to monetary rewards he would receive, Roeder agreed.

Among the Sperry development secrets Roeder disclosed were the blueprints of the complete radio instrumentation of the new Glenn Martin bomber, classified drawings of range finders, blind-flying instruments, a bank-and-turn indicator, a navigator compass, a wiring diagram of the Lockheed Hudson bomber, and diagrams of the Hudson gun mountings. From Roeder the Abwehr also obtained the plans for an advanced automatic pilot device that was later used in Luftwaffe fighters and bombers. At the time of his arrest, Roeder had 16 guns in his Long Island home in New York.

Roeder pleaded guilty to espionage and was sentenced to 16 years in prison. In 1949, Roeder published his book, Formulas in plane triangles.

=== Paul Alfred W. Scholz ===
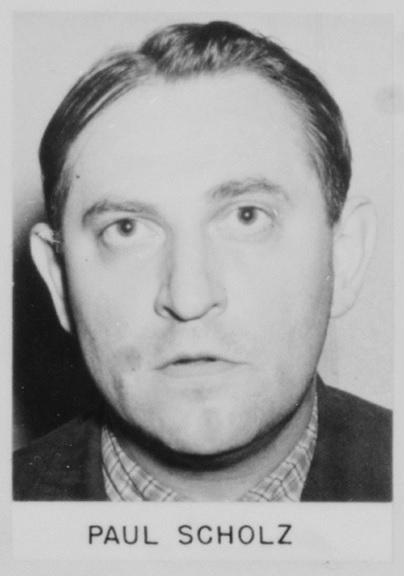

A German native, Paul Scholz went to the United States in 1926 but never attained citizenship. He had been employed in German book stores in New York City, where he disseminated Nazi propaganda.

Scholz had arranged for Josef Klein to construct the radio set used by Felix Jahnke and Axel Wheeler-Hill. At the time of his arrest, Scholz had just given Gustav Wilhelm Kaercher a list of radio call letters and frequencies. He also encouraged members of this spy ring to secure data for Germany and arranged contacts between various German agents.

After being convicted at trial, Scholz was sentenced to 16 years in prison for espionage and received a concurrent two-year sentence under the Registration Act.

=== George Gottlob Schuh ===
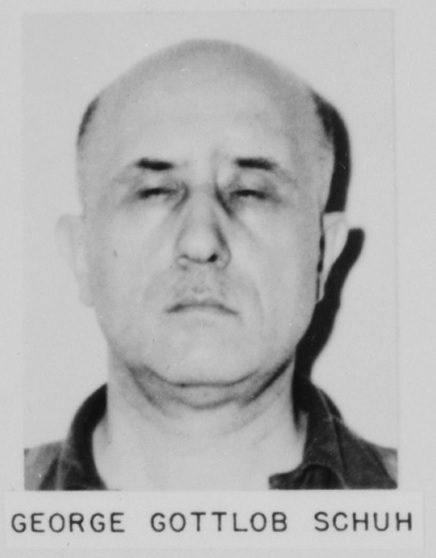

George Gottlob Schuh, a native of Germany, went to the United States in 1923. He became a citizen in 1939 and was employed as a carpenter.

As a German agent, he sent information directly to the Gestapo in Hamburg from the United States. Schuh had provided Alfred Brokhoff information that Winston Churchill had arrived in the United States on HMS King George V. He also furnished information to Germany concerning the movement of ships carrying materials and supplies to Britain.

Having pleaded guilty to violation of the Registration Act, Schuh received a sentence of 18 months in prison and a $1,000 fine.

=== Erwin Wilhelm Siegler ===
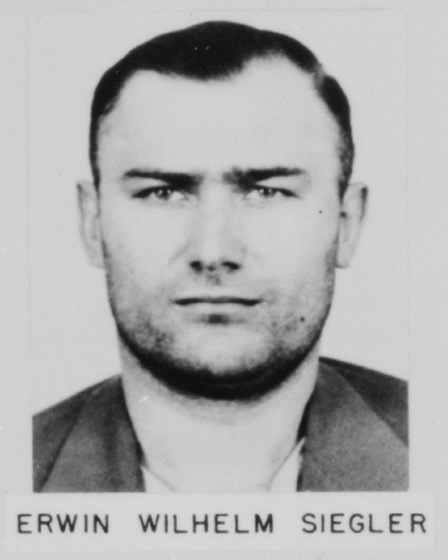

Erwin Wilhelm Siegler went to the United States from Germany in 1929 and attained citizenship in 1936. He had served as chief butcher on the SS America (1940) until it was taken over by the U.S. Navy.

A courier, Siegler brought microphotographic instructions to Sebold from German authorities on one occasion. He also had brought $2,900 from German contacts abroad to pay Lilly Stein, Duquesne, and Roeder for their services and to buy a bomb sight. He served the espionage group as an organizer and contact man, and he also obtained information about the movement of ships and military defense preparations at the Panama Canal.

After being convicted at trial, Siegler was sentenced to 10 years in prison for espionage and a concurrent two-year term for violating the Registration Act.

=== Oscar Richard Stabler ===
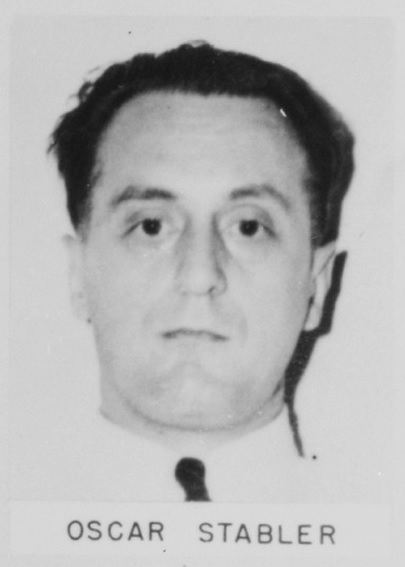

Born in Germany, Oscar Richard Stabler went to the United States in 1923 and became a citizen in 1933. He had been employed primarily as a barber aboard transoceanic ships. In December 1940, British authorities in Bermuda found a map of Gibraltar in his possession. He was detained for a short period before being released. A close associate of Conradin Otto Dold, Stabler served as a courier, transmitting information between German agents in the United States and contacts abroad.

Stabler was convicted and sentenced to five years in prison for espionage and a concurrent two-year term under the Registration Act.

=== Heinrich Stade ===
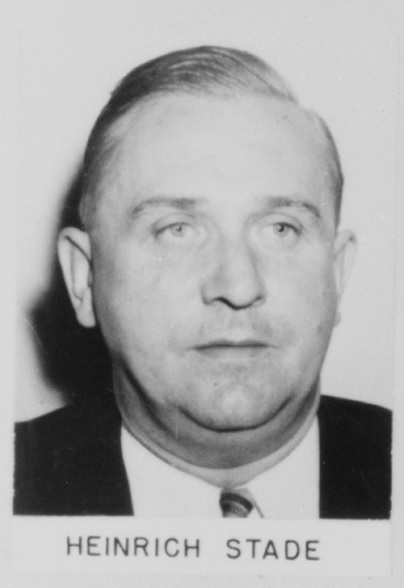

Heinrich Stade went to the United States from Germany in 1922 and became a citizen in 1929. He had been a musician and publicity agent in New York. He told agent Sebold he had been in the Gestapo since 1936 and boasted that he knew everything in the spy business.

Stade had arranged for Paul Bante's contact with Sebold and had transmitted data to Germany regarding points of rendezvous for convoys carrying supplies to England.

Stade was arrested while playing in the orchestra at an inn on Long Island, New York. Following a guilty plea to violation of the Registration Act, Stade was fined $1,000 and received a 15-month prison sentence.

=== Lilly Barbara Carola Stein ===
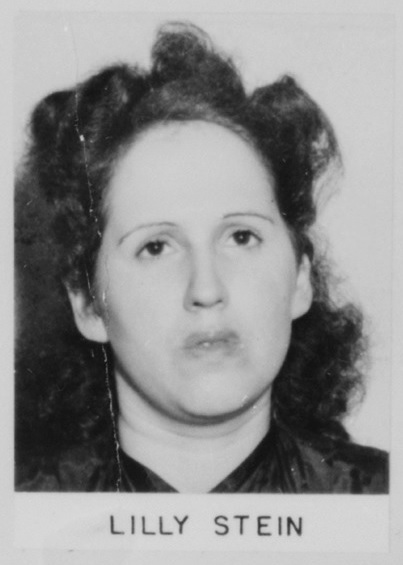

Born in Vienna, Stein was a Jewish immigrant who had escaped in 1939 with the help of a U.S. diplomat in Vienna, Vice Consul Ogden Hammond Jr. She later met Hugo Sebold, the espionage instructor who had trained William Sebold (the two men were not related) in Hamburg, Germany. She enrolled in this school and was sent to the United States by way of Sweden in 1939.

In New York, she worked as an artist's model and was said to have moved in New York's social circles. As a German agent her mission was to find her targets at New York nightclubs, sleep with these men, and attempt to blackmail them or otherwise entice them to give up valuable secrets. One FBI agent described her as a "good-looking nymphomaniac". Stein was one of the people to whom Sebold had been instructed to deliver microphotograph instructions upon his arrival in the United States. She frequently met with Sebold to give him information for transmittal to Germany, and her address was used as a return address by other agents in mailing data for Germany.

Stein pleaded guilty and was sentenced to 10 years in prison for espionage and a concurrent two-year term for violating the Registration Act. After her release, she left for France where she found employment at a luxury resort near Strasbourg.

=== Franz Joseph Stigler ===
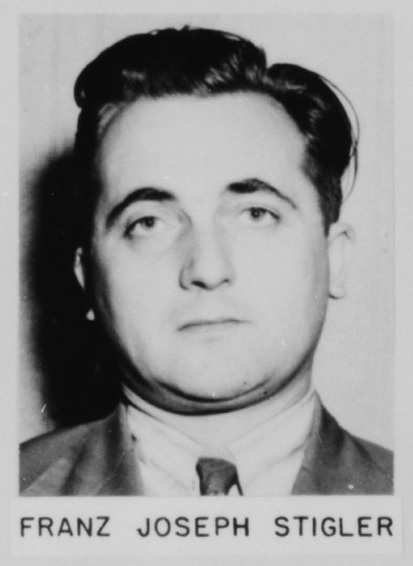

In 1931, Franz Joseph Stigler left Germany for the United States, where he became a citizen in 1939. He had been employed as a crew member and chief baker aboard U.S. ships until his discharge from the SS America (1939) when the U.S. Navy converted that ship into USS West Point. His constant companion was Erwin Siegler, and they operated as couriers in transmitting information between the United States and German agents aboard. Stigler sought to recruit amateur radio operators in the United States as channels of communication to German radio stations. He had also observed and reported defense preparations in the Panama Canal Zone and had met with other German agents to advise them in their espionage pursuits. In January 1941, Stigler asked agent Sebold to radio Germany that Prime Minister Winston Churchill had arrived secretly in the U.S. on HMS King George V (41) with Lord Halifax.

Upon conviction, Stigler was sentenced to serve 16 years in prison on espionage charges with two concurrent years for registration violations.

=== Erich Strunck ===
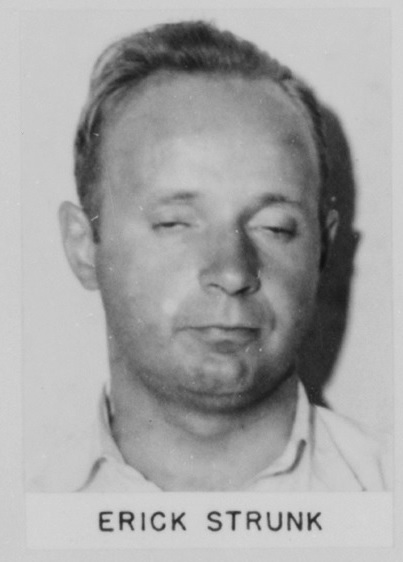

A seaman aboard the ships of the United States Lines since his arrival in the United States, Erich Strunck went to the United States from Germany in 1927. He became a naturalized citizen in 1935. As a courier, Strunck carried messages between German agents in the United States and Europe. He requested authority to steal the diplomatic bag of a British officer traveling aboard his ship and to dispose of the officer by pushing him overboard. Sebold convinced him that it would be too risky to do so.

Strunck was convicted and sentenced to serve 10 years in prison on espionage charges. He also was sentenced to serve a two-year concurrent term under the Registration Act.

=== Leo Waalen ===
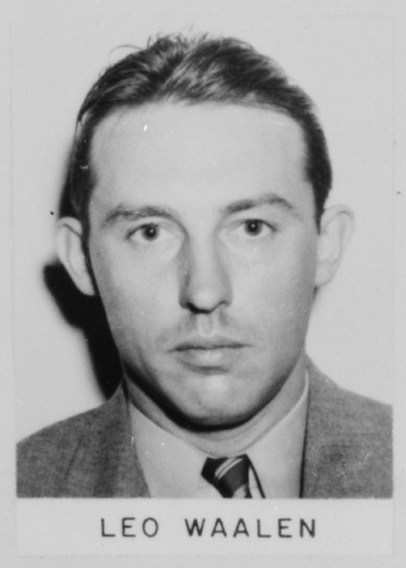

Leo Waalen was born in Danzig, Germany. He entered the United States by "jumping ship" about 1935. He was a painter for a small boat company which was constructing small craft for the U.S. Navy.

Waalen gathered information about ships sailing for England. He also obtained a confidential booklet issued by the FBI which contained precautions to be taken by industrial plants to safeguard national defense materials from sabotage. He secured government contracts listing specifications for materials and equipment, as well as detailed sea charts of the United States Atlantic coastline.

In May 1941, the American cargo vessel SS Robin Moor was carrying nine officers, 29 crewmen, seven or eight passengers, and a commercial cargo from New York to Mozambique via South Africa, without a protective convoy. On 21 May, the ship was stopped by U-69 in the tropical Atlantic 750 mi (1,210 km; 650 nmi) west of the British-controlled port of Freetown, Sierra Leone. Although the Robin Moor was flying the flag of a neutral country, her mate was told by the U-boat crew that they had decided to "let us have it". After a brief period for the ship's crew and passengers to board her four lifeboats, the U-boat fired a torpedo and then shelled the vacated ship. Once the ship sank beneath the waves, the submarine's crew pulled up to Captain W.E. Myers' lifeboat, left him with four tins of ersatz bread and two tins of butter, and explained that the ship had been sunk because she was carrying supplies to Germany's enemy. In October 1941, federal prosecutors adduced testimony that Waalen, one of the fourteen accused men who had pleaded not guilty to all charges, had submitted the sailing date of the Robin Moor for radio transmission to Germany, five days before the ship began her final voyage.

Following his conviction, Waalen was sentenced to 12 years in prison for espionage and a concurrent two-year term for violation of the Registration Act.

=== Adolf Henry August Walischewski ===
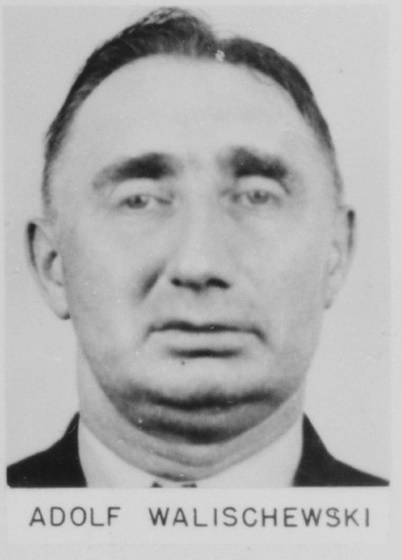

A German native, Walischewski had been a seaman since maturity. He became a naturalized citizen in 1935. Walischewski became connected with the German espionage system through Paul Fehse. His duties were confined to those of courier, carrying data from agents in the United States to contacts abroad.

Upon conviction, Walischewski received a five-year prison sentence on espionage charges, as well as a two-year concurrent sentence under the Registration Act.

=== Else Weustenfeld ===
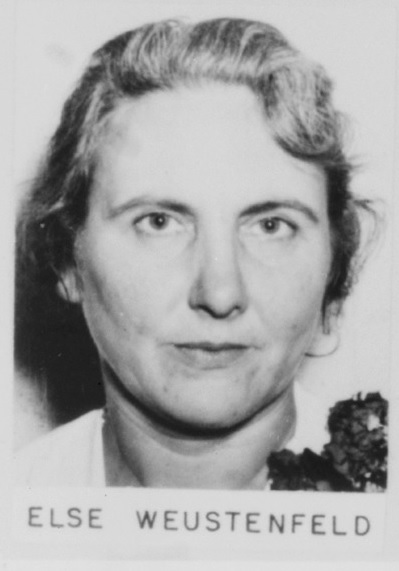

Else Weustenfeld arrived in the United States from Germany in 1927 and became a citizen 10 years later. From 1935 until her arrest, she was a secretary for a law firm representing the German Consulate in New York City.

Weustenfeld was thoroughly acquainted with the German espionage system and delivered funds to Duquesne which she had received from Lilly Stein, her close friend.

She lived in New York City with Hans W. Ritter, a principal in the German espionage system. His brother, Nickolaus Ritter, was the "Dr. Renken" who had enlisted Sebold as a German agent. In 1940, Weustenfeld visited Hans Ritter in Mexico, where he was serving as a paymaster for the German Intelligence Service.

After pleading guilty, Else Weustenfeld was sentenced to five years' imprisonment on charge of espionage and two concurrent years on a charge of registration violations.

=== Axel Wheeler-Hill ===
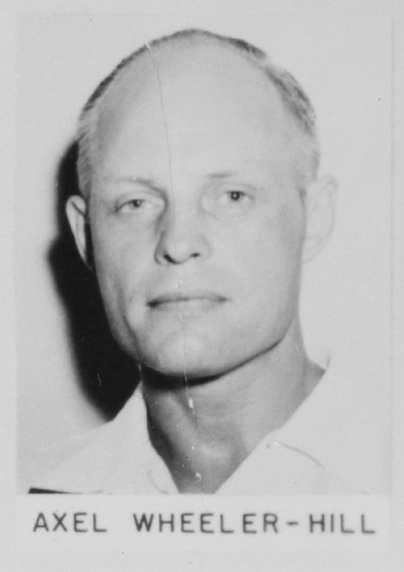

Axel Wheeler-Hill went to the United States in 1923 from his native Latvia. Between 1918 and 1922, he'd served in the Baltic Freikorps during the Latvian War of Independence. He was naturalized as a citizen in 1929 and was employed as a truck driver.

Wheeler-Hill obtained information for Germany regarding ships sailing to Britain from New York Harbor. With Felix Jahnke, he enlisted the aid of Paul Scholz in building a radio set for sending coded messages to Germany.

Following conviction, Wheeler-Hill was sentenced to serve 15 years in prison for espionage and 2 concurrent years under the Registration Act.

=== Bertram Wolfgang Zenzinger ===
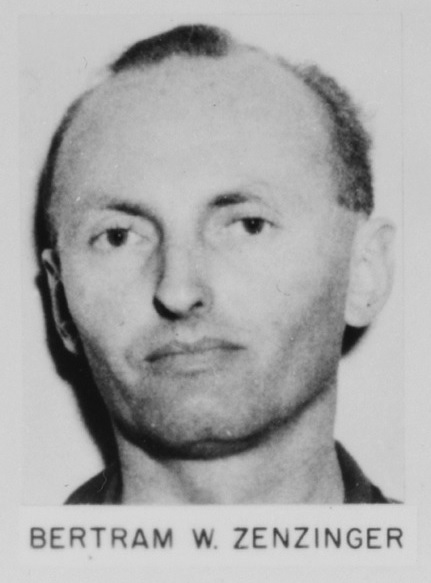

Born in Germany, Bertram Wolfgang Zenzinger went to the United States in 1940 as a naturalized citizen of the Union of South Africa. His reported reason for coming to the United States was to study mechanical dentistry in Los Angeles, California.

In July 1940, Zenzinger received a pencil for preparing invisible messages for Germany in the mail from Siegler. He sent several letters to Germany through a mail drop in Sweden, outlining details of national defense materials.

Zenzinger was arrested by FBI agents on April 16, 1941. Pleading guilty, he was sentenced to 8 years in prison for espionage and 18 months in prison for Registration Act.

== Liaisons to the Duquesne Spy Ring ==
=== Takeo Ezima ===
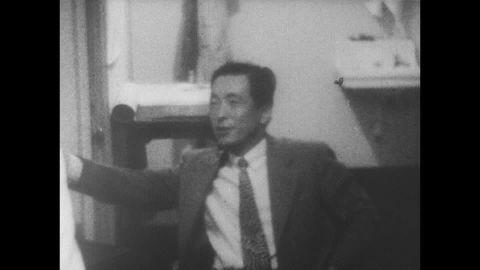
Takeo Ezima discusses intelligence documents with Abwehr agent Harry Sawyer (FBI agent Sebold), 1941.

Lieutenant Commander Takeo Ezima of the Imperial Japanese Navy operated in New York as an engineer inspector using the name: E. Satoz; code name: KATO.

He arrived on the Heian Maru in Seattle in 1938. On October 19, 1940, Sebold received a radio message from Germany that CARR (Abwehr Agent Roeder) was to meet E. Satoz at a Japanese club in New York.

Ezima was filmed by the FBI while meeting with agent Sebold in New York, conclusive evidence of German-Japanese cooperation in espionage, in addition to meeting with Kanegoro Koike, Paymaster Commander of the Japanese Imperial Navy assigned to the Office of the Japanese Naval Inspector in New York. Ezima obtained a number of military materials from Duquesne, including ammunition, a drawing of a hydraulic unit with pressure switch A-5 of the Sperry Gyroscope, and an original drawing from the Lawrence Engineering and Research Corporation of a soundproofing installation, and he agreed to deliver materials to Germany via Japan. The British had made the Abwehr courier route from New York through Lisbon, Portugal difficult, so Ezima arranged an alternate route to the west coast with deliveries every two weeks on freighters destined for Japan.

As the FBI arrested Duquesne and his agents in New York in 1941, Ezima escaped to the west coast, boarded the Japanese freighter Kamakura Maru, and left for Tokyo. One historian states that Ezima was arrested for espionage in 1942 and sentenced to 15 years; however, U.S. Naval Intelligence documents state that "at the request [of] the State Department, Ezima was not prosecuted."

=== Nikolaus Adolph Fritz Ritter ===
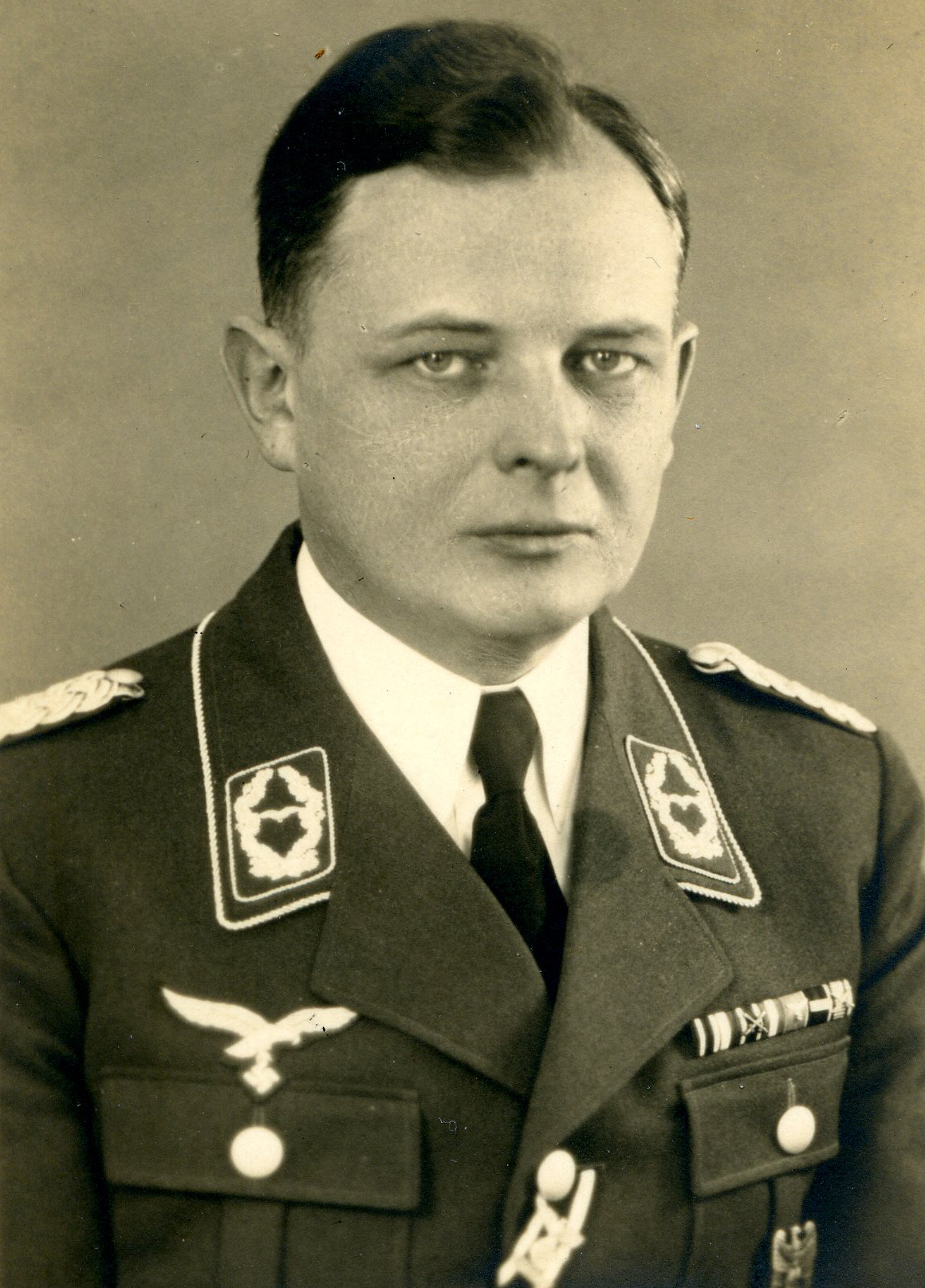
Nikolaus Ritter, 1940.

Oberstleutnant (Lieutenant colonel) Nikolaus Ritter led spy rings in the United States, Great Britain, and North Africa from 1936 to 1941. Ritter was born in Germany and had served as an officer in the First World War on the Western Front in France where he was twice wounded. He emigrated to New York in 1924, married an American, and returned to Germany in 1936 to join the Abwehr as Chief of Air Intelligence based in Hamburg operating under the code name: DR. RANTZAU.

He first met Fritz Duquesne in 1931, and the two spies reconnected in New York on December 3, 1937. Ritter also met Herman Lang while in New York, and he arranged for Lang to later go to Germany to help the Nazis finish their version of the top secret Norden bombsight. Ritter achieved several major successes with the Abwehr, most notably the Norden bombsight, in addition to an advanced aircraft auto-pilot from the Sperry Gyroscope Company, and also intelligence operations in North Africa in support of Field Marshal Erwin Rommel. But some of Ritter's recruits became double-agents who catastrophically exposed his spy rings.

Ritter recruited William Sebold who later joined the FBI which resulted in the arrest of the 33 Abwehr agents of the Duquesne Spy Ring. In Great Britain, he recruited Arthur Owens, code named JOHNNY, who became an agent for MI5 (British Intelligence) operating under the code name SNOW. Owens exposed so many Abwehr covert agents operating in Britain that by the end of the war MI5 had enlisted some 120 double agents. Although Ritter was never captured, it was the arrest of the Duquesne Spy Ring that ultimately resulted in Ritter's fall from the Abwehr and his reassignment in 1942 to air defenses in Germany for the remainder of the Second World War.

== See also ==
- Operation Pastorius
