= Fritz Duquesne =

South African soldier and spy (1877–1956)

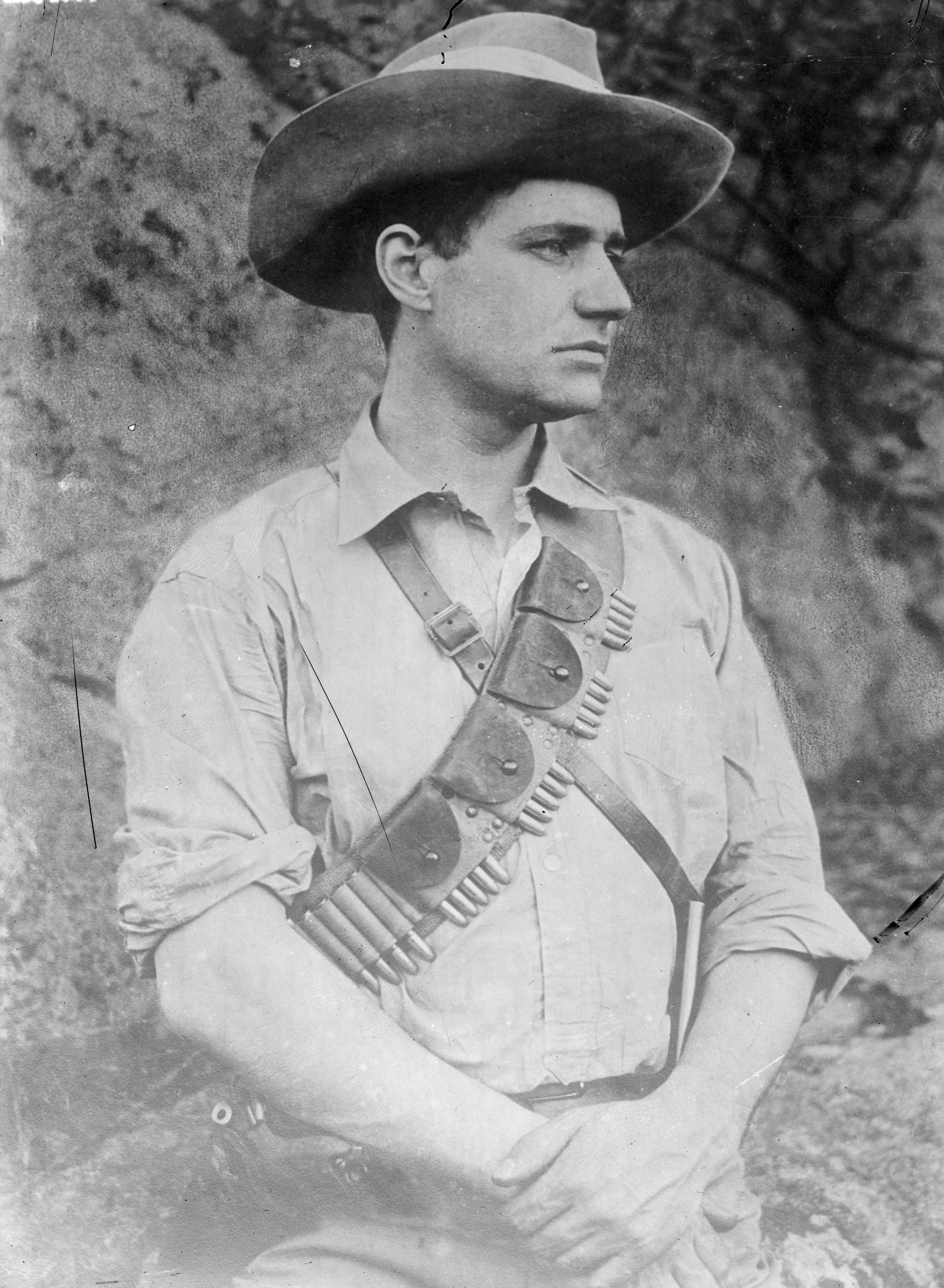
- Captain Duquesne, Boer Army picture, c. 1900
- Born: Frederick Joubert Duquesne; 21 September 1877; East London, Cape Colony
- Died: 24 May 1956 (aged 78); New York City, U.S.
- Military career
- Allegiance: South African Republic; German Empire; Nazi Germany
- Branch: primarily Espionage
- Service years: 1899–1901 (Boer); 1901 (British) c. 1913–1942 (German)
- Rank: Captain (Boer Army; South Africa); Lieutenant (Britain; infiltrator) Colonel (Germany)
- Nicknames: The man who killed Kitchener; The Black Panther;The Duke; Aliases (c. 30 known): Captain Claude Stoughton; Frederick Fredericks; Boris Zakrevsky (assumed the identity of the real-life Russian Duke); Major Frederick Craven; George Fordham; Piet Niacud; Colonel Beza
- Commands: Duquesne Spy Ring
- Conflicts: Second Boer War: — Siege of Ladysmith — Battle of Colenso — Battle of Bergendal — Plot to sabotage Cape Town; World War I — Espionage in United States — Sinking of 22 British merchant ships in South America, including: the Tennyson, the Salvador, and the Pembrokeshire — Sinking of HMS Hampshire (disputed) — Assassination of Lord Kitchener (disputed); World War II — Espionage in United States
- Awards: Iron Cross, 1916 (disputed)
- Other work: commando; war correspondent; journalist; con man

Frederick "Fritz" Joubert Duquesne (/djuːˈkeɪn/ dew-KAYN; sometimes Du Quesne; 21 September 1877 – 24 May 1956) was a South African Boer and German soldier, big-game hunter, journalist, and spy. Many of the claims Duquesne made about himself are in dispute; over his lifetime he used multiple identities, reinvented his past at will, claimed family ties to aristocratic clans and famous people and even asserted the right to military titles and medals with no third-party verification. (Note: Many details of Duquesne's life are captured in his biography by Clement Wood, The Man Who Killed Kitchener (1932). However, Duquesne was known to embellish his genuine successes, and Wood is frequently criticized because he neither tells the reader where Duquesne likely stretched the truth nor does he provide any citations to support his statements. Since most of the incidents in Wood's biography can be authenticated from other sources, the only incidents included here are those that have also been authenticated elsewhere. A note has been added wherever conflicting information from authoritative sources has been found.)

Duquesne fought on the side of the Boers in the Second Boer War and as a secret agent for Germany during both World Wars. He gathered human intelligence, led spy rings and carried out sabotage missions as a covert field asset in South Africa, the United Kingdom, Central and South America, and the United States. Duquesne went by many aliases, fictionalized his identity and background on multiple occasions, and operated as a con man. As a Boer spy he was known as the "Black Panther", in World War II he operated under the code name DUNN, and in FBI files he is frequently referred to as "The Duke". He was captured, convicted, and escaped from several prisons.

During the Second Boer War, Duquesne was captured and imprisoned three times by the British and once by the Portuguese, and each time he escaped. On one occasion he infiltrated the British Army, became an officer and led an attempt to sabotage Cape Town and to assassinate the commander-in-chief of the British forces, Lord Kitchener. His team was given up by an informant and all were captured and sentenced to death. He later became known as "the man who killed Kitchener" since he claimed to have guided a German U-boat to sink HMS Hampshire on which Lord Kitchener was en route to Russia in 1916, although forensics of the ship do not support this claim.

After a failed attempt to escape prison in Cape Town, Duquesne was sent to prison in Bermuda, but he escaped to the US and became an American citizen. In World War I, he became a spy and ring leader for Imperial Germany, sabotaging and destroying British merchant ships in South America with concealed bombs. After he was caught by federal agents in New York in 1917, Duquesne feigned paralysis for two years and cut the bars of his cell to make his escape, thereby avoiding deportation to Britain where he faced murder charges for the deaths of British sailors.

In 1932, Duquesne was again captured in New York by federal agents and charged with both homicide and for being an escaped prisoner, only this time he was set free after the British authorities declined to pursue his wartime crimes. The last time Duquesne was captured and imprisoned was in 1941, when he and thirty-two other members of the Duquesne Spy Ring working for Nazi Germany were caught by William G. Sebold, a double agent with the FBI who half-pretended to be spying for the Germans. Duquesne was later convicted in the largest espionage conviction in American history.

Between wars, Duquesne served as an adviser on big-game hunting to US President Theodore Roosevelt, as a publicist in the movie business, as a journalist, as a fictional Australian war hero and as head of the New Food Society in New York. During the Second Boer War he had been under orders to kill Frederick Russell Burnham, Chief of Scouts in the British Army, but in 1910 he worked with both Burnham and then Rep. Robert Broussard to lobby the United States Congress to fund the importation of hippopotamuses into the Louisiana bayous to solve a severe meat shortage.

== Early life ==
Frederick Joubert Duquesne was born to a Boer family of French Huguenot origin in East London, Cape Colony, in 1877. He later moved with his parents, Abraham Duquesne and Minna Joubert, to Nylstroom in the South African Republic, where they started a farm. Abraham made his living as a hunter who also frequently traveled to sell skins, tusks and horns, and he hired local indigenous peoples to work the farm. He had two younger siblings, his sister Elsbet and his brother Pedro. He was a descendant of the French Huguenot naval commander Abraham Duquesne (1610–1688) and claimed his uncle was Piet Joubert (1831–1900), a hero in the First Boer War and Commandant-General of the South African Republic, although his family relationship is disputed.

As a youth, Duquesne became a hunter like his father. His hunting skills proved useful not only in the African veld, but also later in life when he would publish articles about and give lectures on big-game hunting. It was during one of his early hunting trips that Duquesne became interested in panthers. He observed a black panther patiently waiting motionless for the perfect time to strike while a cautious African buffalo approached and drank from a nearby water hole. The panther became his totem and its hunting style also became his. In the Second Boer War, Duquesne became known as the "Black Panther", and as a spy in the 1930s he stamped "all of his communiques to Germany with the figure of a cat, back arched and fur raised in anger."

At age 12, Duquesne killed a Zulu who attacked his mother. He used the man's assegai short sword to stab him in the stomach. Not long after the killing, a war party from a Bantu-speaking tribe attacked the area near Nylstroom, and the Duquesne family was forced to retreat to the nearby river. The family, along with six other settler families, fought a long gun battle against the Impi and Duquesne shot and killed several. When the fighting ended, his uncle Koos, his wife and their baby were all dead.

When he was aged 13, Duquesne was sent to school in England. After graduation, biographer Clement Wood states that Duquesne went to Oxford University for a year and then attended the Académie Militaire Royale in Brussels; however, his attendance records at these two institutions have never been found. Also, Duquesne himself writes that after he finished school in England he was sent to Europe to study engineering, but on the ship he met an embezzler named Christian de Vries and the two decided to take a trip around the world.

== Second Boer War ==
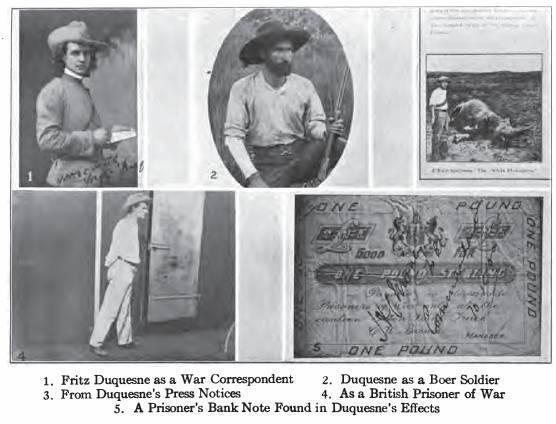
Pictures of Duquesne found at his home in New York after his arrest in 1917.

He was one of the craftiest men I ever met. He had something of a genius of the Apache for avoiding a combat except in his terms; yet he would be the last man I should choose to meet in a dark room for a finish fight armed only with knives. Next to Theron, I believe Duquesne the greatest scout the Boers produced.

— Frederick Russell Burnham, DSO, Chief of Scouts, British Army

When the Second Boer War broke out in 1899, Duquesne returned home to join the Boer commandos. Commissioned at the rank of lieutenant, he was attached to the general staff of Commandant-General Piet Joubert in Pretoria. Duquesne was subsequently wounded by a British bullet that went through his right shoulder at the siege of Ladysmith, and was later promoted to the rank of captain in a Boer artillery unit. Duquesne was captured by British troops at the Battle of Colenso, and was taken to Durban where he managed to escape.

After British forces began an offensive aimed at capturing Pretoria, a portion of the gold reserve in the city's central bank and national mint was sent by train to the small town of Machadodorp, then by road to the neutral harbor of Lourenço Marques in Portuguese Mozambique to be shipped to the Netherlands for the use of President Paul Kruger and other Boer exiles who had fled from Africa. A final tally showed about 1.5 million pounds (680,000 kilos) of gold bullion was removed from the central bank and national mint between 29 May and 4 June 1900.

Duquesne was in command of a shipment of gold bullion being sent by wagon to Portuguese Mozambique; however, it never made it to Lourenço Marques. While in the bushveld of Portuguese Mozambique, a violent disagreement broke out among the shipment's escort. This resulted in a violent confrontation that left only three wounded Boers (including Duquesne) and several indigenous porters alive. Duquesne ordered the porters to hide the gold in a nearby cave for safekeeping, along with burning the wagons and killing any wounded they found. He gave the porters all the oxen, except for one which he rode away on. Historian Art Ronnie argued that the buried gold, commonly referred to as "Kruger's Millions" is only a legend; however, in 2001 and 2013 there have been news reports about possible discoveries of the missing gold.

Duquesne rejoined the Boer forces in time for the Battle of Bergendal, but his unit was forced to fall back to Portuguese Mozambique. Many members of the unit, including Duquesne, were captured by Portuguese forces and sent to an internment camp in Caldas da Rainha, Portugal. For Duquesne, this would become a watershed event, as Ronnie noted "life would never be the same for him... In a few months, he would be launched on a forty-year career as a professional spy and counterfeit hero– a man who would constantly reinvent himself to suit the needs of the moment."

At Caldas da Rainha, Duquesne charmed the daughter of one of the camp's guards, who helped him escape to Paris. From there, he went to Aldershot, Hampshire and infiltrated the British Army. In 1901, Duquesne was posted to South Africa in 1901 as an officer. There, he passed through his hometown of Nylstroom, discovering that his parents' farm had been destroyed by British forces as part of scorched earth policies implemented by Lord Kitchener. Duquesne also discovered that his sister had been raped and killed, and his mother interned in the Nylstroom concentration camp. Ronnie writes: "the fate of his country and of his family would breed in him an all-consuming hatred of England" and "would turn him into what (a biographer of Duquesne) Clement Wood called: a walking living breathing searing killing destroying torch of hate".

Duquesne returned to Cape Town with secret plans to sabotage British installations and assassinate Kitchener. He recruited twenty Boers for his plans, but the group was betrayed by the wife of one. On 11 October 1901, while attending a dinner with Sir Walter Hely-Hutchinson, the governor of the Cape Colony, Duquesne was arrested for criminal conspiracy and espionage. He was court-martialled and sentenced to be executed along with his co-conspirators. The other members of his team were executed by firing squad, but as a plea bargain, Duquesne's sentence was reduced to life in prison. In exchange, Duquesne agreed to divulge secret Boer codes and to translate several of their dispatches. According to Ronnie, "for the rest of his life he swore he never betrayed the Boer cause but actually created new codes that would mislead the British." Duquesne was imprisoned in the Castle of Good Hope in Cape Town, a fortification built by the Dutch East India Company in 1666. The walls of the castle were extremely thick, yet night after night, Duquesne dug away the cement around the stones with an iron spoon. He nearly escaped one night, but a large stone slipped and pinned him in his tunnel. The next morning, a guard found him unconscious but uninjured.

Duquesne was one of many Boer prisoners sent to the British colony of Bermuda, an archipelago known for its frequent storm-wracked conditions, shark infested waters and dangerous reefs. According to Ronnie, Bermuda was an "impossible, hopeless, and impregnable prison of pink beaches and sunlit waters from which no prisoner could escape – or so believed the British." Duquesne escaped from several other prisoner-of-war camps, and on the night of 25 June 1902, he slipped out of his tent, climbed a barbed-wire fence, and swam 1.5 miles (2.4 km) past patrol boats and bright spot lights. He used a distant lighthouse for navigation until he arrived on the main island. Duquesne then went to the home of Anna Maria Outerbridge, a leader of a Boer Relief Committee. Outerbridge helped him escape to the port of St. George's, Bermuda, where another Boer Relief Committee member, W. E. Meyer, arranged for his transportation off the island. Within the week, Duquesne was a passenger on a ship heading to the United States.

== In the United States ==
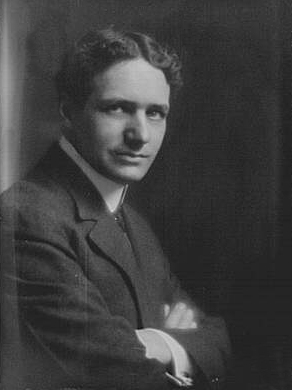
Fritz Duquesne c. 1913

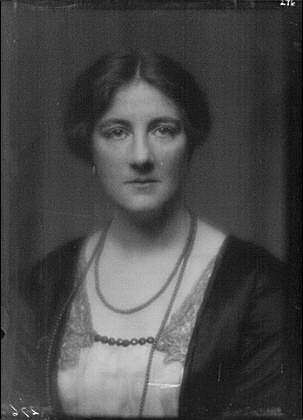
Alice Wortley Duquesne c. 1913

After entering the country in Baltimore, Duquesne proceeded to New York City. He found employment as a journalist for the New York Herald and other newspapers by writing adventure stories. The Second Boer War ended in 1902 with the Boers signing the Treaty of Vereeniging, but with his family dead, Duquesne never returned to South Africa. While in New York, he published a novel in the French newspaper Le Petit Bleu, and two other novels published in South Africa. In 1908, he was written up in Men of America as a travelling correspondent sent to locations such as Port Arthur (now the Chinese Lüshunkou District) to report on the Russo-Japanese War, Morocco to report on the Riff Rebellion and to the Belgian Congo (now the Democratic Republic of the Congo) to accompany Sir Arthur Jones on an expedition. In June 1910 he married Alice Wortley, an American, but their marriage ended in divorce eight years later.

During the Second Boer War, Duquesne was under orders to assassinate Frederick Russell Burnham, the American acting as Chief of Scouts for the British Army. After the war, Burnham remained active in counter-espionage for the British, and much of it involved keeping track of Duquesne. In 1910 he and Representative Robert Broussard founded the New Food Supply Society to import useful African wildlife into the US as a solution to a serious American meat shortage, and Broussard selected Duquesne as an expert. In support of this plan, Broussard introduced H.R. 23261, also known as the American Hippo Bill, attempting the appropriation of $250,000 to import hippopotamus into the Louisiana bayous as a food source and to control the water hyacinth then clogging Southern river systems. Former US President Theodore Roosevelt backed the plan, as did the US Department of Agriculture, as well as editorial writers in The Washington Post and The New York Times, which praised the taste of hippopotamus as "lake cow bacon". Duquesne's expert testimony on this subject before the House Committee on Agriculture is recorded in the Congressional Record. The bill fell just short of passing, and the New Foods organization was disbanded.

To my friendly enemy, Major Frederick Russell Burnham, the greatest scout of the world, whose eyes were that of an Empire. I once craved the honor of killing him, but failing that, I extend my heartiest admiration.
--Letter signed: Fritz Joubert Duquesne, 1933,
One warrior to another.

During this time, Duquesne became former President Roosevelt's personal shooting instructor and accompanied him on a hunting expedition. He published several newspaper articles on Roosevelt's hunting trip to Africa, safari big game hunting in general and the heroic accomplishments of Caucasian people to bring civilization to black Africans. Duquesne became a naturalized American citizen in December 1913.

== First World War ==
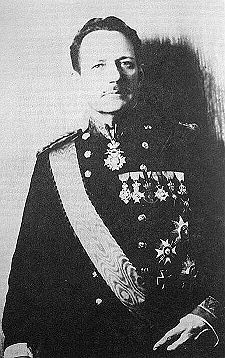
Capt. Duquesne in German uniform

After meeting a German-American industrialist in the Midwest around 1914, Duquesne became a spy for Imperial Germany. He was sent to Brazil as "Frederick Fredericks" under the disguise of "doing scientific research on rubber plants". As an agent for German naval intelligence in South America, he was assigned to disrupt commercial traffic to countries at war with Germany. Duquesne received and delivered communiques through German embassies, and he was responsible for numerous bombings of British merchant ships. From his base in Bahia, he planted time bombs disguised as cases of mineral samples on British ships and he was credited with sinking twenty-two of them; among them were the Salvador and the Pembrokeshire. Additionally, one of his bombs killed three British sailors and nearly sank the SS Tennyson in February 1916, and another started a fire on the Vauban.

After the bombing of the Tennyson, MI5 (British intelligence) operating in Brazil arrested an accomplice named Bauer who identified Duquesne as both the perpetrator of the crime and the ringleader. Bauer further revealed that Duquesne was operating under his own name and two aliases, George Fordam and Piet Niacud. Niacud is the pronunciation of Duquesne reversed. British intelligence confirmed that Duquesne was "a German intelligence officer ... involved in a series of acts of sabotage against British shipping in South American waters during the war". His cover now blown, Duquesne moved to Buenos Aires, Argentina, and several weeks later placed an article in a newspaper reporting his own death in Bolivia at the hands of Amazonian natives.

Duquesne evaded British intelligence in South America and returned to New York around May 1916. Using the aliases George Fordam and Frederick Fredericks, he had taken out insurance policies for the cargo he shipped and he now filed claims for the "films" and "mineral samples" lost with the ships he sank off the coast of Brazil, including Tennyson. The insurance companies were reluctant to pay and began their own investigations, which would go on for another year.

In his book The Man Who Killed Kitchener, biographer Clement Wood states that Duquesne left for Europe in June 1916 under orders from German intelligence. Duquesne posed as the Russian Duke Boris Zakrevsky and joined Lord Kitchener on HMS Hampshire in Scotland. Once on board, Duquesne signaled the German U-boat that sank the cruiser, thus killing Lord Kitchener. Duquesne made his own escape using a life raft before the ship was torpedoed and he was rescued by the U-boat.

Duquesne was allegedly awarded the Iron Cross for this act, and he appears in several pictures in German uniform wearing an Iron Cross, in addition to other medals. Captain Louis Botha, son of the former prime minister of South Africa General Louis Botha, further writes that "Duquesne was a great friend of the Botha family" and that Duquesne "rose from the status of a Private in the German Army to the rank of Colonel and received the Iron Cross during the great war." The authenticity of several of these claims has been challenged by modern biographers, and the German records that would confirm or deny at least parts of these accounts are now missing and presumed destroyed during the war. According to the official story, Hampshire was lost in a force 9 gale after striking a mine laid by U-75, a German U-boat.

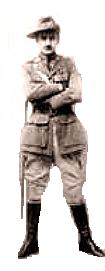
Fritz Duquesne under the alias Captain Claude Stoughton. Printed on U.S. War bonds in World War I.

The next confirmed appearance of Duquesne is in Washington, D.C., in July 1917, not long after the US declared war on Germany. He had contacted Broussard, who by now was a United States Senator. Unaware that Duquesne was now a German spy, Broussard attempted to help him obtain a position with General George Washington Goethals, the acting US Army Quartermaster and former chief engineer of the Panama Canal, but he was not successful. Additionally, Duquesne filed patents for an underwater electromagnetic mine which he then attempted to sell to the United States Navy.

As a covert spy, it was necessary for Duquesne to manipulate people, assuming new identities and cover stories. It is known that he was handsome, charismatic, intelligent, fluent in several languages and as FBI Agent Raymond Newkirk observed, "the Duke was a very interesting talker but he always had to be the center of attention." Duquesne also sometimes took his deceptions further than seems necessary.

With the advent of World War I, Duquesne's stories of great white hunters and African safaris no longer fascinated the American public, and when he returned to New York he was dropped from the lecture circuit. To get back on stage he needed new material, so with the help of German intelligence he re-invented himself and pretended to be an Allied war hero, Captain Claude Stoughton of the Western Australian Light Horse regiment, a man who claimed to have "seen more war than any man at present" and claimed to have been "bayoneted three times, gassed four times, and stuck once with a hook." Duquesne appeared before New York audiences dressed in uniform as Stoughton to tell them war stories, promote the sale of Liberty Bonds and to make patriotic speeches for organizations such as the Red Cross. As historian Jon Mooallem explains it, "Captain Stoughton's career took off. His talks made decent money, his heroism earned him respect, and ladies found him alluring", and "the Black Panther was an adrenaline junkie ... his invented persona had such magnetism and such possibility, in fact, that he began deploying his alter-ego in a wide variety of personal appearances ... it is possible that Duquesne simply liked attention, the performance."

Duquesne was arrested in New York on 17 November 1917 on charges of fraud for insurance claims. At the time of his arrest, he had in his possession a large file of news clippings related to the bombing of ships, as well as a letter from the Assistant German Vice Consul at Managua in Nicaragua. The letter indicated that Duquesne was "one who has rendered considerable service to the German cause." British authorities were also looking at Duquesne as the agent responsible for "murder on the high seas, arson, faking Admiralty documents and conspiring against the Crown", and the American authorities agreed that they would extradite Duquesne to Britain, if the British sent him back afterward to serve his sentence for fraud.

== 1919 to 1939 ==
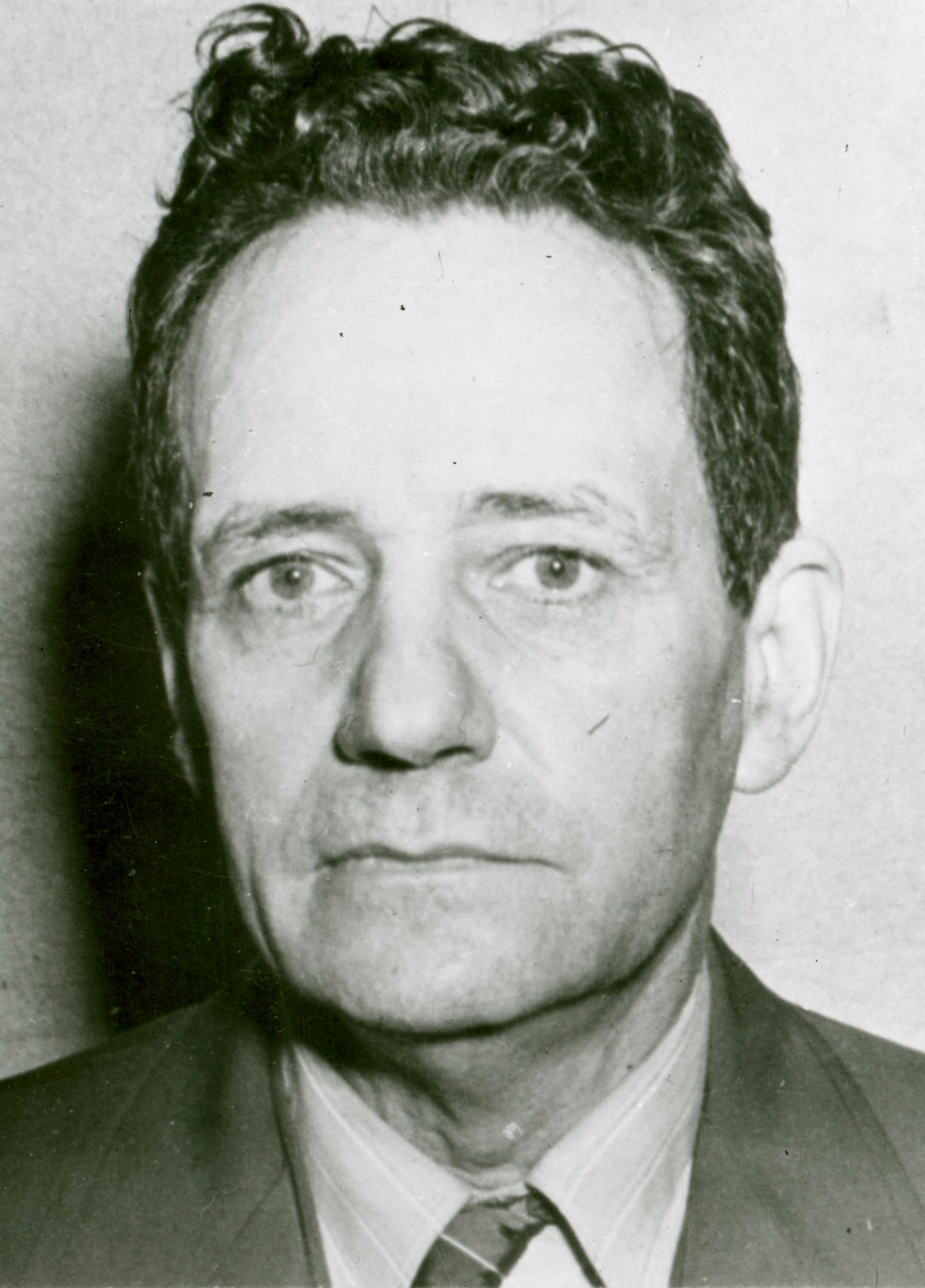
Fritz Duquesne FBI file photo

After his arrest in New York, and while awaiting extradition to Britain on murder charges, Duquesne pretended to be paralyzed. He was sent to the prison ward at Bellevue Hospital. On 25 May 1919, after nearly two years of feigning paralysis and just days before his extradition, he disguised himself as a woman and escaped by cutting the bars of his cell and climbing over the barrier walls to freedom. Police Commissioner Richard E. Enright sent out the following bulletin:

This man is partly paralysed in the right leg and always carries a cane. May apply for treatment at a hospital or private physician. He also has a skin disease which is a form of eczema. If located, arrest, hold and wire, Detective Division, Police Headquarters, New York City, and an officer will be sent for him with necessary papers.

The London Daily Mail published the following on 27 May 1919:

Col. Fritz du Quesne, a fugitive from justice, is wanted by His Majesty's government for trial on the following charges: Murder on the high seas; the sinking and burning of British ships; the burning of military stores, warehouses, coaling stations, conspiracy, and the falsification of Admiralty documents.

Duquesne fled to Mexico and Europe, but in 1926 he moved back to New York and assumed a new identity as Frank de Trafford Craven. He worked for Joseph P. Kennedy's Film Booking Offices of America (FBO Pictures), and later RKO Pictures, as part of the publicity staff. As part of this job he moved back to Manhattan, where he was well known under his real name. In 1930, Duquesne moved to the Quigley Publishing Company, a producer of movie magazines, and called himself Major Craven.

On 23 May 1932, police arrested Duquesne in the Quigley Building in New York. He was brutally interrogated by police and charged with murder on the high seas. Duquesne claimed it was a case of mistaken identity and that his name really was Major Craven. Wood had recently published The Man Who Killed Kitchener, so the police asked Wood to identify the man in custody. Wood insisted that the man was not Duquesne but rather Major Craven, whom he had known for five years. Police did not believe Wood. Agent Thomas Joseph Tunney was brought in to positively identify Craven as Duquesne, the same man he had arrested in 1917. Duquesne was charged with homicide and as an escaped prisoner. He was defended by Arthur Garfield Hays. After Britain declined to pursue his war crimes, noting that the statute of limitations had expired, the judge threw out the only remaining charge of escape from prison and released Duquesne.

After his release, Duquesne remained associated with the Quigley family, and he talked for hours about the methods he used to blow up ships. To verify the stories, Quigley had Duquesne meet with several experts, the most prominent of whom was Fr. Wilfrid Parsons, SJ, editor of the Jesuit magazine, America. The experts verified his command of languages, that he was widely traveled and a skilled impersonator. While the chronology was imprecise, everything Duquesne told Quigley that could be verified proved to be correct.

In the spring of 1934, Duquesne became an intelligence officer for the Order of 76, an American pro-Nazi organization, and in January 1935 he began working for the US government's Works Progress Administration. Admiral Wilhelm Canaris, head of the Abwehr (German military intelligence), knew Duquesne from his work in World War I and instructed his new chief of operations in the US, Col. Nikolaus Ritter, to make contact with Duquesne. Ritter had been friends with Duquesne back in 1931, and the two spies reconnected in New York on 3 December 1937. Ritter employed several other successful agents across the US, most notably Herman Lang, who delivered to the Germans the blueprints for the Norden bombsight, but he also made the mistake of recruiting a man who would later become a double agent, William Sebold. On 8 February 1940, Ritter sent Sebold to New York under the alias of Harry Sawyer and instructed him to set up a shortwave radio-transmitting station to establish contact with the German shortwave station abroad. Sebold was also instructed to use the code name TRAMP and to contact a fellow agent code named DUNN, who was Duquesne.

== Second World War – Duquesne Spy Ring ==
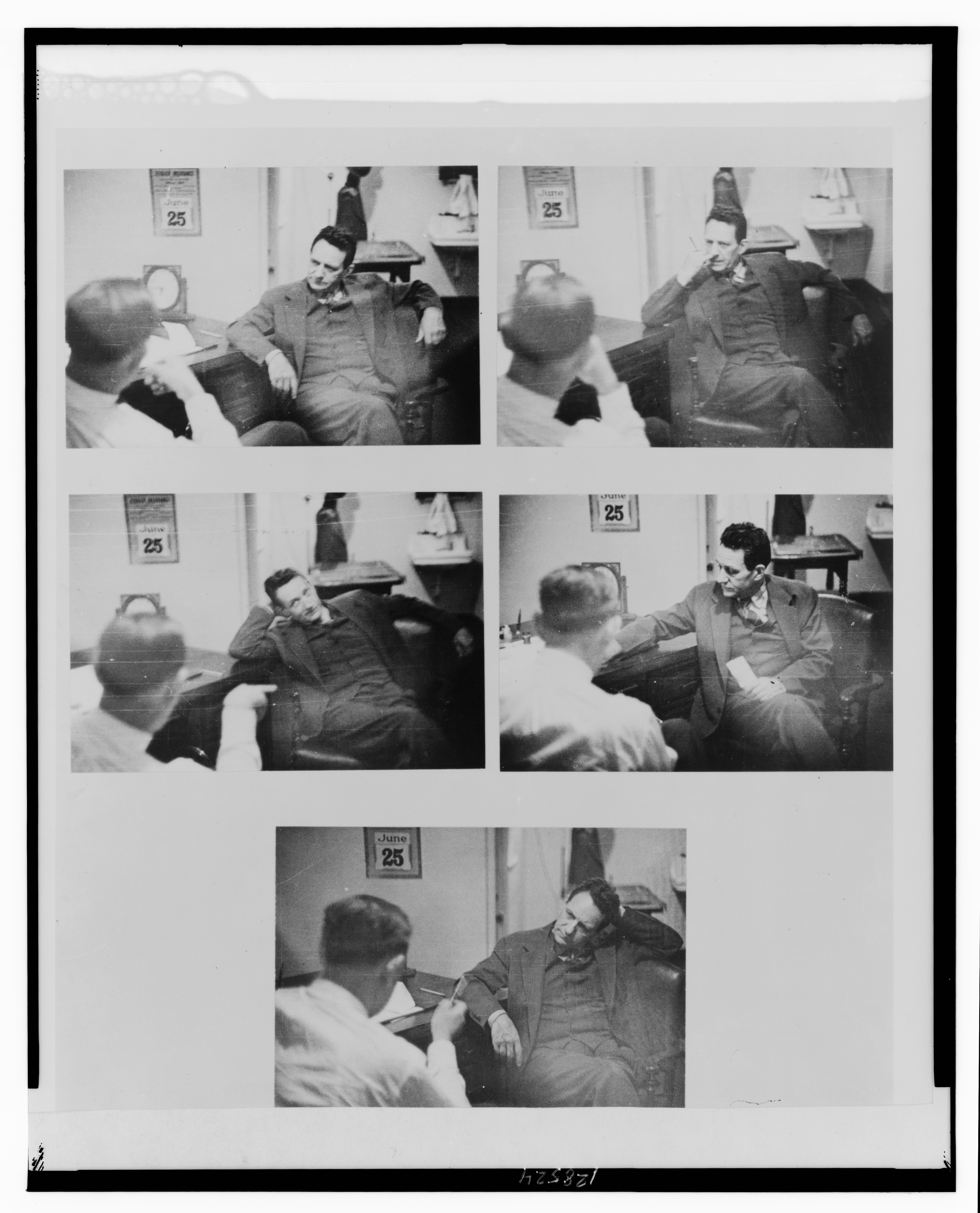
FBI surveillance photographs of Duquesne in the office of William Sebold, 25 June 1941

Once the FBI discovered through Sebold that Duquesne was again in New York operating as a German spy, FBI Director J. Edgar Hoover provided a background briefing to US President Franklin Roosevelt. The dossier from that time gave a summary of Duquesne's prior history and stated that, "no information, whatsoever, concerning the whereabouts and activities of Duquesne since June 6, 1932, is possessed by the Federal Bureau of Investigation." FBI Agent Newkirk, using the name Ray McManus, was now assigned to DUNN and rented a room immediately above Duquesne's apartment near Central Park, using a hidden microphone to record his conversations. However, monitoring Duquesne's activities proved to be difficult. As Newkirk described it, "The Duke had been a spy all of his life and automatically used all of the tricks in the book to avoid anyone following him ... He would take a local train, change to an express, change back to a local, go through a revolving door and keep going on right around, take an elevator up a floor, get off, walk back to the ground, and take off in a different entrance of the building." Duquesne also informed Sebold that he was certain he was under surveillance, and he even confronted one FBI agent and demanded that he stop tracking him, a story confirmed by Newkirk.

The FBI leased three adjacent rooms in Times Square. One room would serve as Sebold's office from which he would receive intelligence reports from German spies that would later be censored by the FBI and partially transmitted by Sebold to Germany. The other two rooms were used by German-speaking FBI agents who would listen in with headphones and record the meetings using a motion picture camera behind a two-way wall mirror. The first time Duquesne arrived at Sebold's office, he surprised the FBI agents by conducting an examination of the office, opening chests, looking in corners and around mirrors, and pointedly asking Sebold, "Where are the mics?" Once he believed he was safe, Duquesne raised his pants leg and removed documents from his sock, such as: a sketch and photo of the M1 Garand semi-automatic rifle, a drawing of a new light tank design, a photo of a US Navy Mosquito boat, a photo of a grenade launcher, and reports on US tanks he had observed at bases at West Point and in Tennessee. Duquesne also described sabotage techniques he had used in earlier wars such as small bombs with slow fuses he could drop through a hole in his pants pocket, and he commented on where he might use these devices again.

=== Arrest and conviction ===
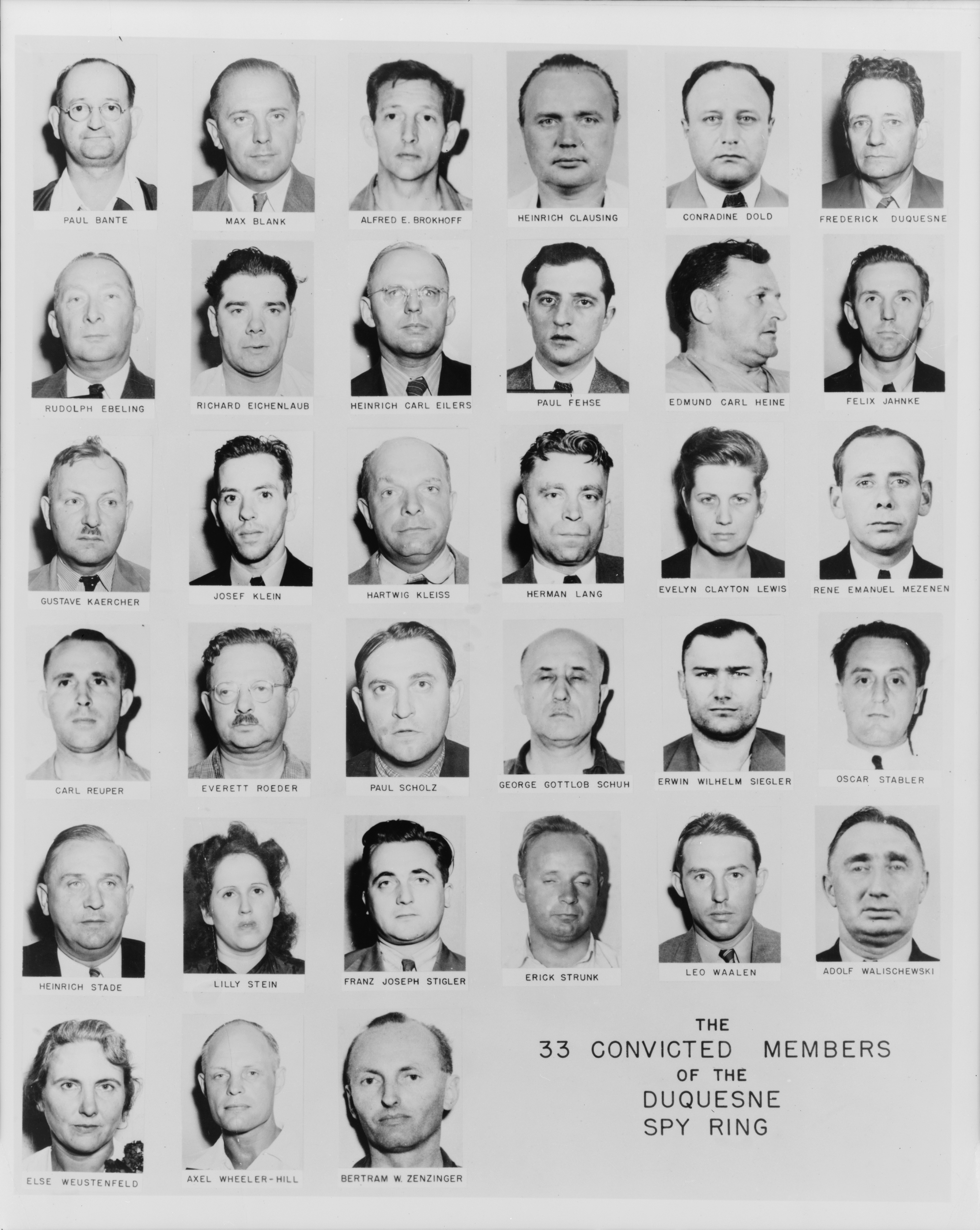
The 33 convicted members of the Duquesne spy ring. Duquesne is pictured in the top, right. (FBI print)

On 28 June 1941, following a two-year investigation, the FBI arrested Duquesne and thirty-two German spies on charges of relaying secret information on US weaponry and shipping movements to Germany. On 2 January 1942, less than a month after the US entered the war, all members of the Duquesne Spy Ring were sentenced to serve a total of more than 300 years in prison. They were found guilty in what historian Peter Duffy said in 2014 is "still to this day the largest espionage case in the history of the United States." One German spymaster later commented that the ring's roundup delivered 'the death blow' to their espionage efforts in the US. Hoover called his FBI swoop on Duquesne's ring the greatest spy roundup in US history.

In a 1942 memo to his superiors, Admiral Canaris of the Abwehr reported on the importance of several of his captured spies by noting their valued contributions, and he writes that Duquesne "delivered valuable reports and important technical material in the original, including US gas masks, radio-controlled apparatus, leak-proof fuel tanks, television instruments, small bombs for airplanes versus airplanes, air separator, and propeller-driving mechanisms. Items delivered were labeled 'valuable', and several 'good' and 'very good'."

The 64-year-old Duquesne did not escape this time. He was sentenced to eighteen years in prison, with a two-year concurrent sentence and $2,000 fine for violation of the Foreign Agents Registration Act. He began his sentence in Leavenworth Federal Penitentiary in Kansas, along with fellow German spy Herman Lang. During his time in prison, he was reportedly mistreated and beaten by other inmates. In 1945, Duquesne was transferred to the Medical Center for Federal Prisoners in Springfield, Missouri, due to his failing physical and mental health. In 1954, he was released owing to ill health, having served fourteen years. His last known lecture was later that same year at the Adventurers' Club of New York, titled "My Life – in and out of Prison".

=== Death ===
Duquesne died at City Hospital on Welfare Island (now Roosevelt Island), in New York City on 24 May 1956, at the age of 78.

== Film accounts ==
- Life of Fritz Duquesne, 1920, by Flint Saturday night publishing company.
- Unseen Enemy, released in 1942, is a feature film based on Duquesne and his life as a German secret agent living in the U.S. in the 1930s. Arthur D. Howden, an acquaintance and fencing opponent of Duquesne, wrote the original script in 1939, two years before Duquesne's arrest and conviction by the FBI.
- The House on 92nd Street, which won screenwriter Charles G. Booth an Academy Award for the best original motion picture story in 1945. Based on the FBI Duquesne Spy Ring case with major changes to story and characters. Duquesne was the inspiration for the part of Col. Hammershon, played by Leo G. Carroll.
- Duquesne Case: Secret (public domain) J Edgar Hoover narrates this 1941 documentary in which the members of the Duquesne Spy Ring are secretly filmed talking with Harry Sawyer (FBI Agent William Sebold) while exchanging money and blueprints. Duquesne looks around the room before removing military diagrams hidden in his sock. Hoover narrates: "Colonel Duquesne ... the most cautious of them all."
- "The Duquesne Case" (1941)
- The Man Who Would Kill Kitchener, by François Verster, a 26-minute documentary film on the life of Fritz Duquesne that won six Stone awards in 1999 and is actively being extended to 52 minutes for international audiences.
- In the television episode Myth Hunters: Legend of Kruger's Millions (Season 2, Episode 9, 2014), Duquesne is played by actor Charlie Richards.
- In June 2014, RatPac Entertainment and Class 5 Films acquired the non-fiction article American Hippopotamus, by Jon Mooallem, about the meat shortage in the U.S. in 1910 and the attempts made by Duquesne, Burnham, and Congressman Robert Broussard to import hippopotamuses into the Louisiana bayous and to convince Americans to eat them.
- In the 2021 film The King's Man, the character of Maximillian Morton (Matthew Goode) also known as the Shepherd is based on Fritz Duquesne himself.

== Works ==
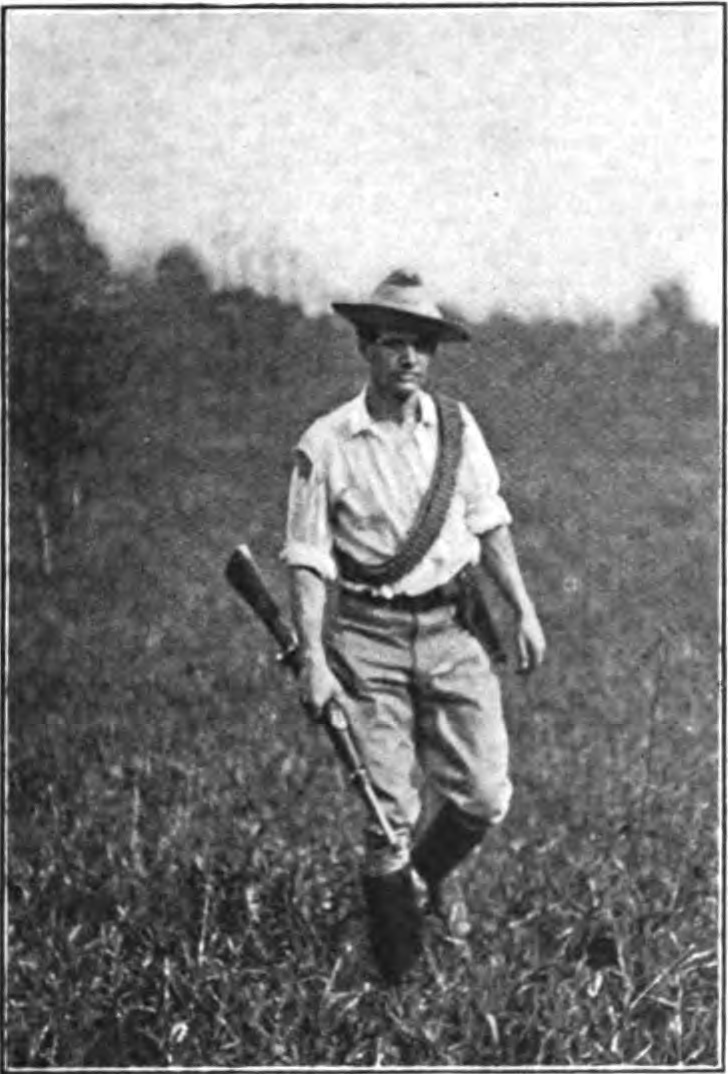
Duquesne on safari (photo from Field and Stream, 1909)

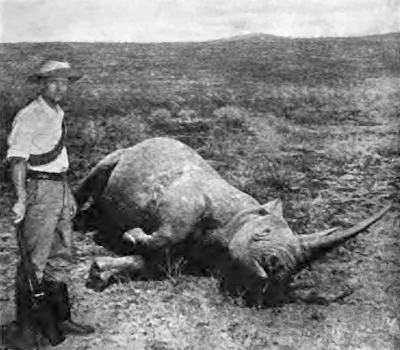
Duquesne poses with his kill (photo from Field and Stream, 1909)

Duquesne authored the following works:

- Duquesne, Captain Fritz (1909). "Trapping Big Game in the Heart of Africa; The Cost of a Trapping Expedition Where Buyers Meet the Caravan Morphone Makes Trapping Less Cruel Conquering the King of Beasts Fight with a Mother Rhinoceros". Hampton's Magazine. 23 (2): 249.
- Duquesne, Captain Fritz (1909). "Hunting With Roosevelt in East Africa; The Colonel Becomes "Bwana Tumbo" Colonel Roosevelt's First Lion a Hair-Raising Leopard Hunt". Hampton's Magazine. 23 (5): 580.
- Duquesne, Captain Fritz (1909). "Hunting Ahead of Roosevelt in East Africa; Illustrations from Photographs Close Call for a Brave Hunter Treed by a Rhino Birthday Party Narrow Escape from Crocodiles". Hampton's Magazine. 22 (2): 143–153.
- Duquesne, Captain Fritz (1909). "Writer's and their Work; Illustrations from Photographs". Hampton's Magazine. 22 (2): 285.
- Duquesne, Captain Fritz (1909). "Hunting Ahead of Roosevelt in East Africa; Second Article Illustrations from Photographs The Mysterious Death of Van Reenan the Giraffe—Awkward and Harmless". Hampton's Magazine. 22 (3): 318.
- Duquesne, Captain Fritz (15 June 1909). "Hunting Ahead of Roosevelt; Elephant Ivory and How It Is Obtained". Los Angeles Times: 13.
- Duquesne, Captain Fritz (20 June 1909). "Hunting Ahead of Roosevelt; The Ugly Rhinoceros and Smaller Game". Los Angeles Times: III 14.
- Duquesne, Captain Fritz (8 July 1909). "The capture of leopards and smaller game". The Bee. p. 8.
- Duquesne, Captain Fritz (10 July 1909). "Getting a Gorilla". Forest and Stream: 45.
- Duquesne, Captain Fritz (August 1909). "Hunting African Big Game; the rifle and cartridges chosen by Roosevelt for use on the dark continent". Field and Stream: 323–328.
- Duquesne, Captain Fritz (8 August 1909). "Hunting Big Game in East Africa; Fire Hunting With the Congo Cannibals Preparing for the Hunt Jungle Animals Flee in Panic Slaughter of the Herd Hunters Also Meet Death Revelry Follows the Hunt Leopard Carries off Goat". San Francisco Chronicle: 4.
- Duquesne, Captain Fritz (March 1910). "Will Roosevelt Return Alive?". The Travel Magazine. XV (6): 271–274. OCLC 1779338.
- Duquesne, Captain Fritz (31 August 1910). "Immigrants That Would Be Welcomed". San Francisco Chronicle: 6.
- Duquesne, Captain Fritz (17 December 1910). "The Lure of Peril: Major Burnham, American Fights for British in South Africa". The Marion Daily Mirror. p. 7.
- Duquesne, Captain Fritz (24 December 1910). "The Lure of Peril: Major Burnham, American Fights for British in South Africa (part two)". The Evening Standard. p. 9.
- Duquesne, Captain Fritz (14 January 1911). "The Lure of Peril: A West Point Hero with the Boers". The Evening Standard. p. 9.
- Duquesne, Captain Fritz (14 January 1911). "The Lure of Peril: Raided by Congo Cannibals or Stopping a Cannibal Raid". The Marion Daily Mirror. p. 2.
- Duquesne, Captain Fritz (21 January 1911). "The Lure of Peril: The Making of the Social Lion". The Marion Daily Mirror: 2.
- Duquesne, Captain Fritz (28 January 1911). "The Lure of Peril: Repulsing the Nicaraguan Army Single Handed". The Marion Daily Mirror. p. 2.
- Duquesne, Captain Fritz (28 January 1911). "The Lure of Peril: Creelman's Courage on the Firing Line". The Evening Standard. p. 9.
- Duquesne, Captain Fritz (4 February 1911). "The Lure of Peril: Dix Morgan the Fighting Engineer". The Evening Standard. p. 9.
- Duquesne, Captain Fritz (March 1911). "Tracking the Man-Killer". Everybody's Magazine. xxiv (3): 291–303.
- "Why Vote for Roosevelt?", a pamphlet by: "A Democrat Capt. Fritz Duquesne", 1912. LC call number: JK2388 1912 .D8
- "The Bullmoosers", sheet music by: "Captain Fritz Duquesne"
- Craven, Frederick (18 March 1920). "Refused Half a Million Since France Needed Fighters". The Boston Globe: E7.

== Notes ==
Footnotes

Source notes
