= William G. Sebold =

FBI double agent

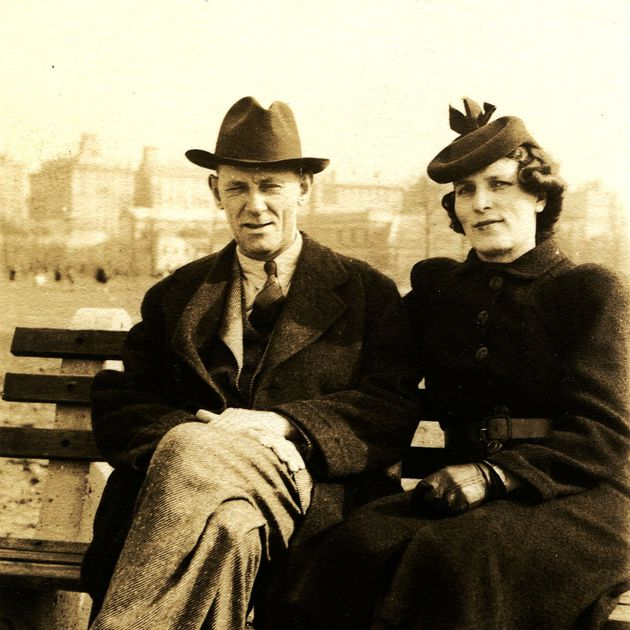
- William Sebold and his wife photographed in New York City, 1937.
- Born: Gottlieb Adolf Wilhelm Sebold; March 10, 1899; Mülheim, Rhine Province, German Empire
- Died: February 16, 1970 (aged 70); Napa, California
- Occupation: Spy
- Spouse: Helen Lena Buchner Sebold
- Espionage activity
- Allegiance: Germany (double agent); United States
- Agency: Abwehr; FBI
- Service years: 1939–1941
- Codename: Tramp
- Operations: Duquesne Spy Ring

William G. Sebold (German: Gottlieb Adolf Wilhelm Sebold; March 10, 1899 – February 16, 1970) was a German-born United States citizen who was coerced into becoming a spy when he visited Germany after being pressured by several high-ranking Nazi members. He informed the American Consul General in Cologne before leaving Germany and became a double agent for the FBI. With the assistance of another German agent, Fritz Joubert Duquesne, he recruited 33 agents that became known as the Duquesne Spy Ring. In June 1941, the Federal Bureau of Investigation arrested all of the agents. They were convicted and sentenced to a total of 300 years in prison.

== Early life ==
Sebold served in the German army engineering corps during World War I. After emigrating to the United States in 1922, he married and worked in industrial and aircraft plants throughout the United States and South America. On February 10, 1936, he became a naturalized citizen of the United States.

He returned to Germany in February 1939 to visit his mother in Mülheim. Upon his arrival in Hamburg, Germany, he was approached by a Gestapo agent who said that Sebold would be contacted in the near future due to the knowledge he obtained while working in United States aircraft factories. Sebold proceeded to Mülheim where he obtained employment.

== Coerced into spying ==
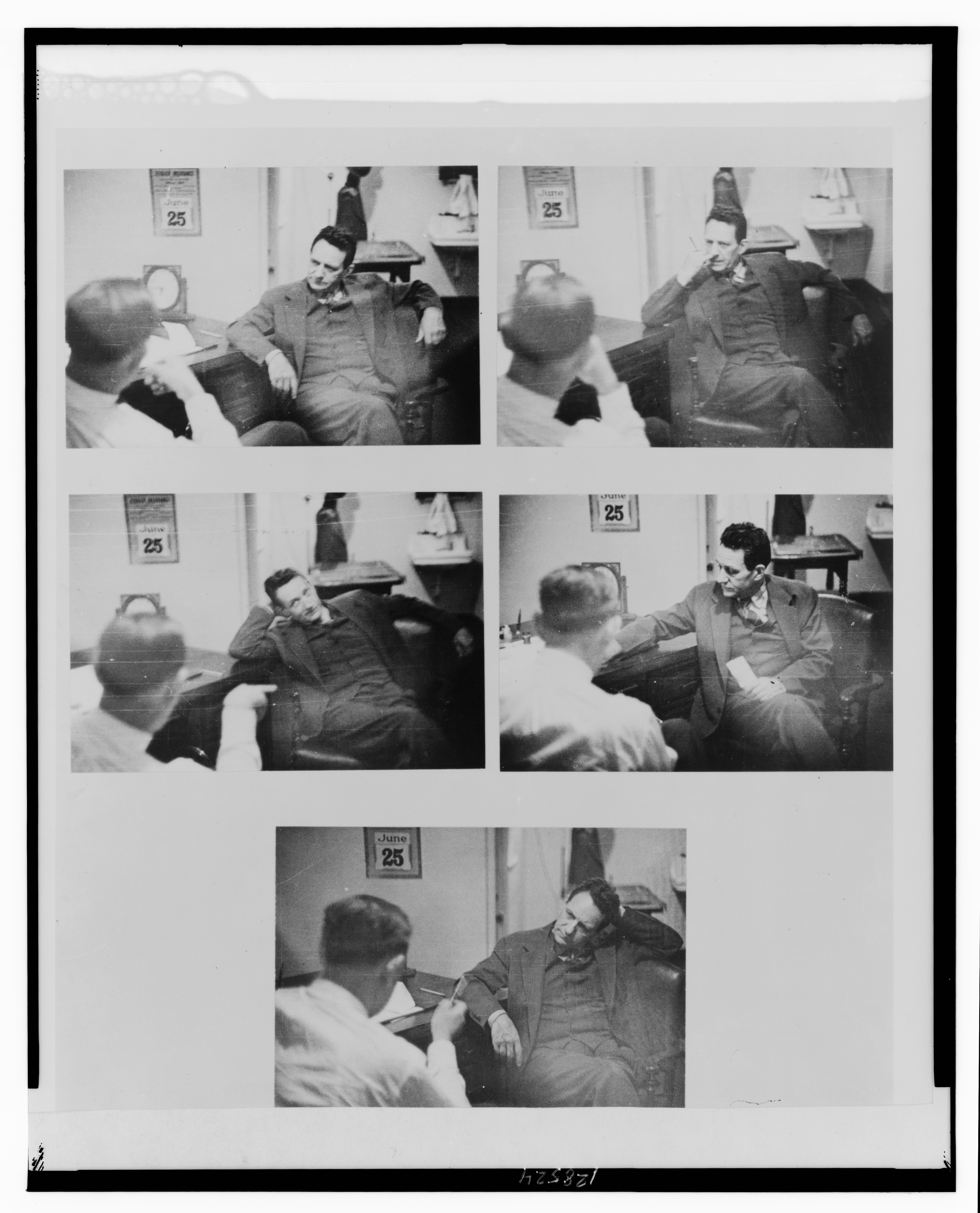
Surveillance photographs of Sebold and Duquesne.

In September 1939, a Dr. Gassner visited Sebold in Mülheim and interrogated him regarding military planes and equipment in the United States. He also asked Sebold to return to the United States as an espionage agent for Germany. Gassner and another man, a "Dr. Renken", told him that they would expose information that he had omitted from his U. S. citizenship application about serving time in a German jail unless he agreed to assist them. Renken was in fact Major Nikolaus Ritter of the Abwehr.

After the threats to his family, his life, and his citizenship, Sebold agreed to cooperate with the Nazis. He was then sent to a seven-week training program in Hamburg, Germany, where he learned to operate a clandestine shortwave radio that he would set up when he returned to the United States.

Ritter gave Sebold final instructions before he left for the United States including shortwave radio codes and the use of microphotographs. Sebold was given the alias "Harry Sawyer", the code name TRAMP, and Abwehr number A.3549.

Sebold was tasked to meet with various spies, pass along instructions to them from Germany, receive messages in return, and transmit them back in code to Germany. The intention was to pull off the efforts of spies who were passing technological secrets to the Germans during World War II.

=== Contacts U.S. consulate ===
Before leaving Germany, Sebold visited the U.S. Consulate in Cologne, Germany, and insisted on speaking with the Consul General. He told the Consul that he had been blackmailed into becoming a German spy but that he was a loyal American citizen and wanted to cooperate with the Federal Bureau of Investigation (FBI) in the United States. The U.S. government agreed.

Sebold sailed from Genoa, Italy, and arrived in New York City on February 8, 1940. There, Sebold (with secret help from the FBI) set himself up as a consulting diesel engineer, with an office in Times Square in Manhattan.

=== Duquesne Spy Ring ===
With the assistance of the FBI, "Harry Sawyer" was able to obtain an office in Times Square for a company under the name "Diesel Research Company". This office provided a seemingly safe space where Nazi spies felt comfortable meeting with and discussing their plans with Sebold. The office also allowed spies to send letters to manufacturers like Consolidated Aircraft Corporation, where they would then receive letters back such as "Development of Diesel Engines". The spies came to the office to deliver blueprints, wartime information, and other sensitive information regarding the United States. However, the office was outfitted with hidden microphones and two-way mirrors, so FBI agents would be able to film the meetings for future use. Using the office, the FBI were able to obtain countless hours of incriminating footage. For example, the group's leader Fritz Joubert Duquesne was caught discussing how fires could be started at industrial plants to slow production, and showed photographs of blueprints for a new bomb being built in the United States. In different footage, a spy explains his plan to bomb a building, going as far as bringing dynamite and detonation caps to Sebold's office.

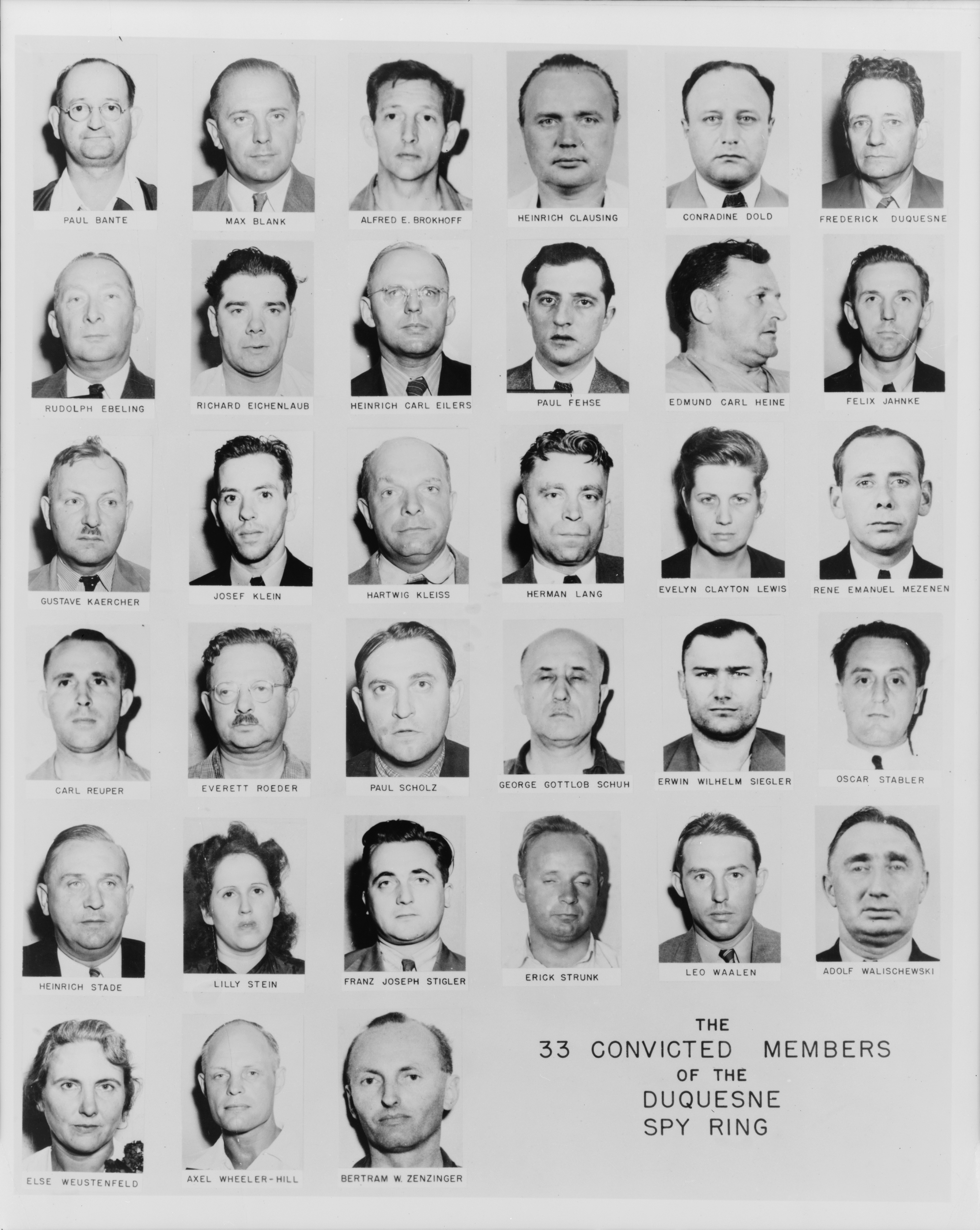
Mugshots of Duquesne Spy Ring members. In his office and with cameras secretly rolling, Sebold met with a string of Nazis who wished to pass secret and sensitive national defense and wartime information to the Gestapo.

Sebold was instructed by the Abwehr to contact Fritz Joubert Duquesne, code-named DUNN, a German spy in New York. Duquesne had been a spy for Germany since World War I; before that, he had been a Boer spy in the Second Boer War. In the United States, Duquesne had been a New York Herald journalist and was the "master coordinator" of the Nazi spies operating in the United States. He contacted aircraft and other technology companies and requested information that he claimed he would use for his lectures. Any plans or photos that he received were sent to the Wehrmacht.

At their first meeting, Duquesne was extremely worried about the possibility of listening devices in Sebold's office. He gave Sebold a note suggesting that they should talk elsewhere. After relocating to an automat, the two men exchanged information about members of the German espionage system with whom they had been in contact.

In his office and with cameras secretly rolling, Sebold met with a string of Nazis who wished to pass secret and sensitive national defense and wartime information to the Gestapo.

Duquesne provided Sebold with information for transmittal to Germany during subsequent meetings, and the meetings that occurred in Sebold's office were filmed by FBI Agents. Duquesne, who was vehemently anti-British, submitted information dealing with national defense in America, the sailing of ships to British ports, and technology. He also regularly received money from Germany in payment for his services.

On one occasion, Duquesne provided Sebold with photographs and specifications of a new type of bomb being produced in the United States. He claimed that he secured that material by secretly entering the DuPont plant in Wilmington, Delaware. Duquesne also explained how fires could be started in industrial plants. Much of the information Duquesne obtained was the result of his correspondence with industrial concerns. Representing himself as a student, he requested data concerning their products and manufacturing conditions.

In May 1940, FBI agents on Long Island set up a shortwave radio station, and established contact with the Abwehr's radio station in Germany, posing as part of Sebold's spy ring. For 16 months this radio station was a main channel of communication between German spies in New York City and the Abwehr. During this time, the FBI's radio station transmitted over 300 messages containing falsified or useless information to Germany, and received 200 messages from Germany. Through Sebold, the U.S. identified dozens of German agents in the United States, Mexico and South America.

In June 1941, the FBI arrested thirty-three German agents that were part of Sebold's network. Nineteen of the agents arrested pleaded guilty. The remainder were tried in Federal District Court, Brooklyn, New York, beginning 3 September 1941. The jury found all fourteen guilty on 13 December 1941. The thirty-three members of the Duquesne Spy Ring were sentenced to serve a total of over three hundred years in prison. Duquesne was sentenced to eighteen years in prison. The Duquesne Spy Ring remains the largest espionage case in U.S. history that ended in convictions.

As a result of the massive investigation, when the United States entered the war the FBI was confident that there was not a major German espionage network hidden in the United States.

When the trial ended, Sebold disappeared. He entered a government witness protection program and moved to California under another assumed identity. He had countless jobs, even trying to be a chicken farmer, but could never hold down a job and was constantly plagued by bad health. Additionally, letters from his family back in Germany explained that the Nazis still wanted to exact their revenge, leaving him in a constant state of fear. Sebold was diagnosed with manic depression and committed to Napa State Hospital in 1965, where he stayed for the last five years of his life before dying of a heart attack on 16 February 1970.

== Books and film ==
Books detailing Sebold's career as a double agent include:

- The 1943 book Passport to Treason: The Inside Story of Spies in America, written by Alan Hynd.
- The 2014 book Double Agent: The First Hero of World War II and how the FBI Outwitted and Destroyed a Nazi Spy Ring, written by Peter Duffy.

Film:

- The 1945 thriller, The House on 92nd Street, is a thinly disguised version of the Duquesne Spy Ring saga.

== See also ==
- FBI Counterintelligence Division
  - British Security Co-ordination
- Leon G. Turrou, FBI Special Agent - 1938 Rumrich-Greibl Ring
