= American hippo bill =

US congress bill

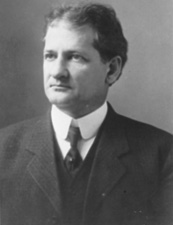
Robert F. Broussard, who proposed the bill in 1910

House Resolution 23261, also known as the "American hippo bill", was a bill introduced by Representative Robert F. Broussard of Louisiana in 1910 to authorize the importation and release of hippopotamuses into the bayous of the state.

== Overview ==
Broussard argued the hippopotamuses would eat the invasive water hyacinth that was clogging the rivers and also produce meat to help solve a meat shortage in the United States. The chief collaborators and proponents of Broussard's bill were Major Frederick Russell Burnham and Captain Fritz Duquesne. Former President Theodore Roosevelt backed the plan, as did the United States Department of Agriculture, The Washington Post, and The New York Times, which praised hippopotamus meat as "lake cow bacon". William Newton Irwin, a researcher for the United States Department of Agriculture recruited by Broussard, told Congress that the bill could add one million tons of meat to the yearly American supply, and further suggested that more exotic animals should be imported for the same purpose, including dik-diks, rhinoceroses, African buffalo, Tibetan yaks, and Manchurian pigs.

Although the "American hippo Bill" developed a broad base of support, it was never passed by the US Congress.

== See also ==
- Hippopotamuses in Colombia
- River of Teeth, a 2017 alternate history novella in which the bill was passed in the 1860s
