= Robert F. Broussard =

American politician

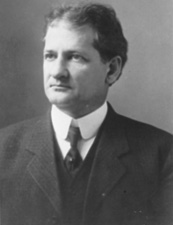

United States Senator from Louisiana
- In office March 4, 1915 – April 12, 1918
- Preceded by: John Thornton
- Succeeded by: Walter Guion

Member of the U.S. House of Representatives from Louisiana's 3rd district
- In office March 4, 1897 – March 3, 1915
- Preceded by: Andrew Price
- Succeeded by: Whitmell P. Martin

Personal details
- Born: Robert Foligny Broussard; August 17, 1864 New Iberia, Louisiana, U.S.
- Died: April 12, 1918 (aged 53) New Iberia, Louisiana, U.S.
- Party: Democratic
- Relatives: Edwin S. Broussard (brother)
- Education: Georgetown University (BA); Tulane University (LLB)

Robert Foligny Broussard (August 17, 1864 – April 12, 1918) was both a U.S. representative and a U.S. senator from Louisiana. He was born on the Mary Louise plantation near New Iberia, the seat of Iberia Parish, to Jean Dorville Broussard, and his wife Anastasie Elizadie Gonsoulin Broussard.

== Career ==
Broussard attended Georgetown University in Washington, D.C., from 1879 to 1882. He was a night inspector of customs in New Orleans from 1885 to 1888, when he was appointed assistant weigher and statistician. He held that position in 1888–89. He graduated from the Tulane University Law School in 1889. He was admitted to the bar the same year and launched his practice in New Iberia. He was elected prosecuting attorney of the Nineteenth Judicial District and held that office from 1892 to 1897.

Broussard was elected as a Democrat to the Fifty-fifth and to the eight succeeding Congresses (March 4, 1897 – March 4, 1915). While in the House of Representative, he was chairman of the Committee on Expenditures in the Department of Justice (Sixty-third Congress); he did not seek renomination in 1914, having become a candidate for Senator. He was elected to the Senate already on 21 May 1912 and served from March 4, 1915, until his death three years later in New Iberia. In the Senate he was chairman of the Committee on National Banks (Sixty-fourth and Sixty-fifth Congresses).

Broussard introduced the "American Hippo Bill", H.R. 23261, in 1910. This bill proposed $250,000 in funding from the federal government to import the hippopotamus from Africa in order to solve two problems at once: the meat shortage in the United States and the invasive plant-species called the Water Hyacinth invading Louisiana's waterways. He was a member of The Boston Club of New Orleans.

Although the "American hippo Bill" developed a broad base of support, it was never passed by the US Congress.

== See also ==
- List of members of the United States Congress who died in office (1900–1949)

U.S. House of Representatives
Preceded by Andrew Price	Member of the U.S. House of Representatives from Louisiana's 3rd congressional district 1897–1915	Succeeded by Whitmell P. Martin
U.S. Senate
Preceded by John Thornton	U.S. senator (Class 3) from Louisiana; March 4, 1915 – April 12, 1918; Served alongside: Joseph E. Ransdell	Succeeded by Walter Guion
