= Ignatz Theodor Griebl =

German-American physician and spy

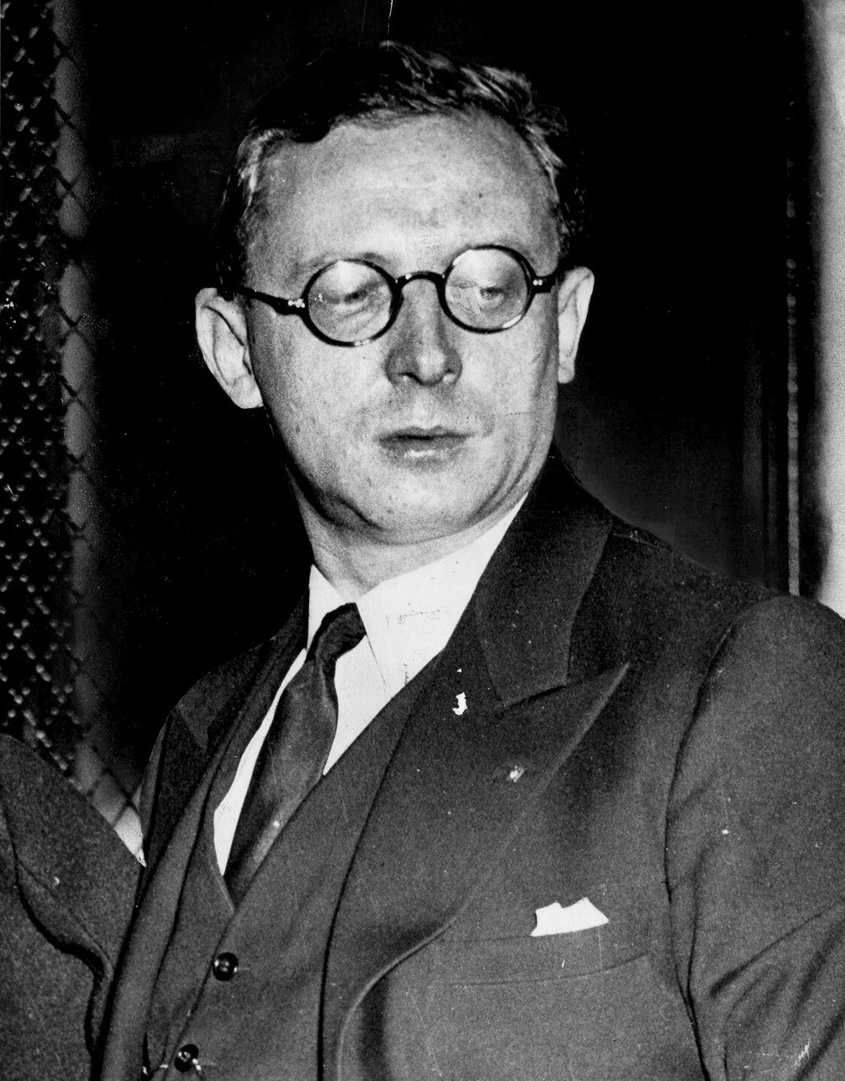
Griebl in 1943

Ignatz Theodor Griebl (30 April 1898 – Unknown) was a German physician notable as a recruiter for the German spy network in New York City in the 1930s, in the era of the Nazi rise to power and buildup to World War II.

== Early life ==
Griebl was born in Straubing, Bavaria, Germany. He served in the German Army as a First Lieutenant Artillery Officer during World War I but was injured during a battle at the Italian front. He later studied medicine at the Ludwig-Maximilians-Universität München and immigrated to the United States of America in 1924.

Griebl first started a practice in Maine but subsequently moved to Yorkville, New York City due to the large community of German-Americans in that area of Manhattan. His medical practice focused on obstetrics.

== Espionage ==
Ignatz Griebl became head of the German spy network in New York in the late 1930s, responsible for recruiting spies for its operations. In 1938, about 13 years after Griebl's emigration to the United States, FBI Special Agent Leon G. Turrou ran an investigation that targeted Nazi German spies actively working within the country. Part of his method of investigation was the use of polygraph tests on potential German espionage candidates. Dr. Ignatz T. Griebl was one of seven subjects who were selected for the mandatory polygraph tests. According to notes, he was the most interesting subject of the test. After it was administered (on May 5, 1938), Dr. Griebl "made us relax all vigilance, all watchfulness over him." However, FBI agents noted that Dr. Griebl appeared worried and perhaps thought he had given himself away. Five days later, the FBI learned that Dr. Griebl had fled to Germany aboard the S.S. Bremen.

Upon his arrival in Germany, Griebl was arrested and sentenced to 12 days in jail for trying to land without a passport. He was released after paying a fine of 60 Reichsmarks.

Representatives of the New York U.S. Attorney Office interviewed Dr. Griebl at the American Consulate in Berlin, Germany on September 17, 1938. Griebl agreed to the meeting in hopes of obtaining the release of his wife, who was then under bail in New York in connection with the espionage trial of individuals indicted as part of the spy ring. At the time, Griebl was reported to be employed as a physician in Vienna.

His naturalization petition to become a U.S. citizen was formally canceled in 1942.

On August 19, 1945, Allied authorities arrested Dr. Griebl in Salzburg, Austria. He was recognized while applying for a travel permit from the Allied Military Government. From this point on he disappears from the historical record.

Griebl remained a fugitive until March 14, 1950, when a nolle prosequi order (dropping the case against the defendant) was approved on the recommendation of U.S. Attorney Irving H. Saypol. Griebl had been under indictment for espionage since June 20, 1938.
