= List of German spies =

The following is a list of people engaged in spying for Germany.

== Pre-WWI ==
- Wilhelm Stieber
- Christian Andreas Käsebier
- Georg Klindworth
- Otto Kueck

== World War I ==
Name	Based	Arrested	Notes
Heinrich Albert	United States		
Karl Boy-Ed	United States		Naval attaché to the German embassy in Washington
Wilhelm Canaris	Spain		
Anton Dilger	United States		
Fritz Joubert Duquesne	Brazil		
Robert Fay	United States	24 October 1915	
Walter von Gerich	Norway		
Horst von der Goltz	United States		
Kurt Jahnke	United States Mexico		
Carl Hans Lody	United Kingdom	2 October 1914	
Mata Hari	France	13 February 1917	
Karl Moor	Switzerland	13 February 1917	
Walter Nicolai	Germany		Associated with Mata Hari
Oskar von Niedermayer	Afghanistan		
Franz von Papen	United States		Naval attaché to the German embassy in Washington
Alexander Parvus	Ottoman Empire		
Bolo Pasha	Ottoman Empire United States	29 September 1917	
Franz von Rintelen	United States		
Otto von Rosen	Finland		
Elsbeth Schragmüller	Belgium		
Jules C. Silber	United Kingdom		Worked as chief censor in United Kingdom
Felix A. Sommerfeld	Mexico		
Gustav Steinhauer	United Kingdom		
Despina Storch	United Kingdom	18 March 1918	
Maria de Victorica	United States	21 April 1918	
Wilhelm Wassmuss	Persian Gulf * Persia	21 April 1918	
Lothar Witzke	United States * Mexico		

== Interwar period ==
Name	Based	Arrested	Notes
Norman Baillie-Stewart	UK	20 March 1933	A WWI veteran who spied for Germany between the wars. Sentenced to five years, he was released from prison on 20 January 1937 and moved to the Continent. He received German citizenship, and was complicit with the broadcasts of Lord Haw Haw.
Princess Stephanie von Hohenlohe	USA	March 1941	A European aristocrat and German sympathizer, she operated in UK before fleeing to San Francisco in 1939. She was not active in USA beyond questioning by American authorities.

== World War II ==
- László Almásy
- Elyesa Bazna
- Otto von Bolschwing
- Willem Ter Braak
- Ernest Peter Burger
- Wilhelm Canaris
- Mathilde Carré
- Coco Chanel
- Eddie Chapman
- Harold Cole
- William Colepaugh
- George John Dasch
- Savitri Devi
- Fritz Joubert Duquesne
- Dick Ellis
- Johannes Eppler
- Hekmet Fahmy
- Gastão de Freitas Ferraz
- Arthur Fonjallaz
- Reinhard Gehlen
- Erich Gimpel
- Hermann Giskes
- Hermann Görtz
- Herbert Hans Haupt
- Stephanie von Hohenlohe
- Kurt Jahnke
- Josef Jakobs
- Werner von Janowski
- Johnny Jebsen
- Tyler Kent
- Edward Kerling
- Simon Emil Koedel
- Kuehn family
- Karl-Erich Kühlenthal
- Marina Lee
- Christiaan Lindemans
- Kurt Frederick Ludwig
- Karl Heinrich Meier
- Horst von Pflugk-Harttung
- Augustin Přeučil
- Paul Reckzeh
- Karel Richard Richter
- Walter Schellenberg
- Günther Schütz
- Duncan Scott-Ford
- William G. Sebold
- Nathalie Sergueiew
- Edgar von Spiegel von und zu Peckelsheim
- Alphons Timmerman
- Anastasy Vonsyatsky
- Jose Waldberg
- Anna Wolkoff
- Hans-Heinrich Worgitzky
- Alfred Quaderer

== Post WWII ==
Name	Based	Arrested	Notes
Carola Stern	Berlin		Head of Amnesty International, political writer and supporter of detente.
Carlos Penate			
Joairam Domingo			

== See also ==
- History of espionage
