= Karl Heinrich Meier =

Karl Heinrich Meier was a Nazi sympathizer and Dutchman of German origin (then aged 24), who, with his accomplice Jose Waldberg, a German national (then aged 25), was hanged at Pentonville Prison in London on 10 December 1940, following his conviction at the Old Bailey the previous month, having been sentenced to death by Mr Justice Wrottesley. These were the first executions under the Treachery Act 1940.

Meier and Waldberg sailed in a fishing trawler across the English Channel on the night of 3 September 1940. Carrying a radio, a pistol, secret ink, maps, food and 60 pounds sterling, they landed at Dungeness. The following morning Meier tried to order a bottle of cider in the village of Lydd, failing to realise that English pub regulations prohibited alcohol sales in the morning. The landlady alerted the police, who arrested Meier and then Waldberg later that same morning.

They both spoke good English, and carried papers showing them to be Dutch refugees from the Nazis.

The two confessed and told of instructions they had received to "observe and report on military objectives, such as aerodromes, concentrations of troops, gun emplacements, and ammunition dumps" and to "mix amongst the civilian population in trains, beffets and public houses, listening carefully to all careless talk by indiscreet civilians".

The Meier case was referred to in a television documentary The Germans Are Coming that screened on the Yesterday channel in 2011.

A fictionalized version of the event forms part of the plot of the Foyle's War episode Fifty Ships.
