= Robert Fay =

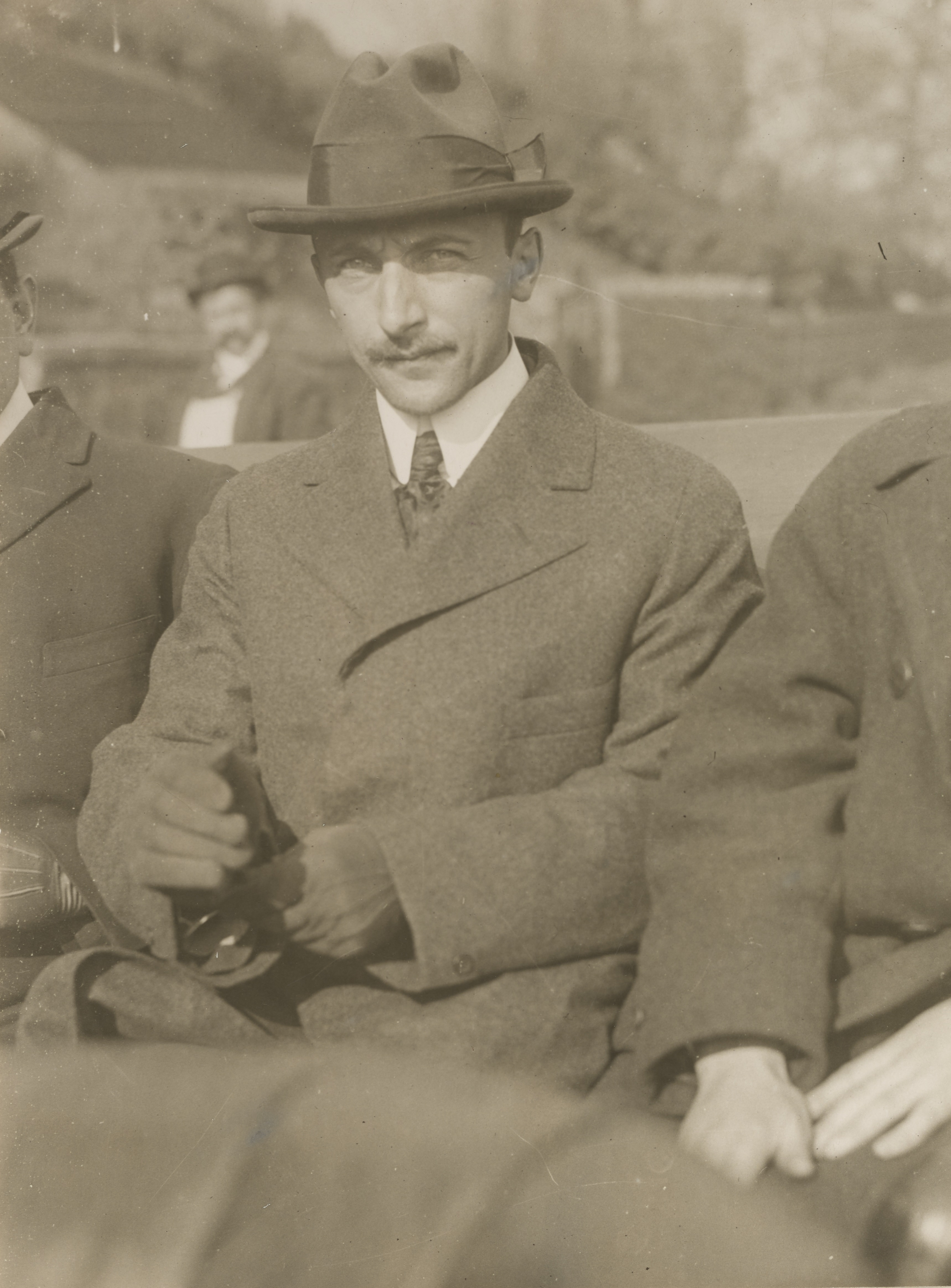
- Robert Fay, alleged German spy

Imperial German secret agent Lieutenant Robert Fay arrived in New York in April 1915 with a mission to sink freight ships on the East Coast of America during World War I. He was arrested in October 1915.

== Early life ==
Robert Fay had worked at the Submarine Signal Company (a company that would eventually merge with Raytheon Company) in Boston before the war and spoke English fluently. He also had family, brother-in-law Walter E. Scholz, who lived in New Jersey.

== Mission to America ==
Robert Fay was serving on the Western Front during WWI when he came up with the idea of a time bomb design that disabled rudders on munitions ships. In an American harbour, the explosive would be installed on the rudder using a small boat. His superiors liked the idea and after finding out about his time in America set him up with a fake British passport under the name of H. A. Kearling and $4,000 (US$ 127,000 in 2025). He arrived in New York City on April 23, 1915.

He was assigned German Foreign Office military attaché Franz von Papen as his handler. Working with Paul Daeche, Walter E. Scholz, Otto Wolpert, Max Breitung and Dr. Herbert O. Kienzle they tried to buy explosives. They eventually made contact with a German-American chemist who was secretly working as a double agent for the U.S. Secret Service. They set up a sting operation offering to provide the explosives, eventually arresting Fay, Scholz, Kienzle, and Daeche on October 24, 1915.

In 1916, a federal court sentenced Robert Fay to 8 years in prison over the plot. Scholz was sentenced to four years in prison, and Daesch was sentenced to two years in prison.

== See also ==
- List of German spies
- List of German sponsored acts of terrorism during WWI

== Bibliography ==
Notes

References

- Baden-Powell, Robert (2014). My Adventures as a Spy. Amberley Publishing Limited. ISBN 9781445636108. - Total pages: 96
- "Motor boat in which German spies planned to carry deadly explosives". Sierra Vista Herald. Bisbee, Cochise, Arizona: Consolidated Printing Company. 2021. pp. 1–8. ISSN 2157-3255. OCLC 11363144.
- MacDonnell, Francis (September 19, 1995). Insidious Foes: The Axis Fifth Column and the American Home Front. Oxford University Press. ISBN 9780195357752. - Total pages: 264
- West, Nigel (2013). Historical Dictionary of World War I Intelligence. Scarecrow Press. ISBN 9780810880023. - Total pages: 460
- von Feilitzsch, Heribert (2015). The Secret War on the United States in 1915. Henselstone Verlag LLC. ISBN 9780985031763. - Total pages: 240
