= Mole (espionage) =

Type of spy

In espionage jargon, a mole (also called a "penetration agent", "deep cover agent", "illegal" or "sleeper agent") is a long-term spy (espionage agent) who is recruited before having access to secret intelligence, subsequently managing to get into the target organization. However, it is popularly used to mean any long-term clandestine spy or informant within an organization (government or private). In police work, a mole is an undercover law-enforcement agent who joins an organization in order to collect incriminating evidence about its operations and to eventually charge its members.

The term was introduced to the public by British spy novelist John le Carré in his 1974 novel Tinker Tailor Soldier Spy and has since entered general usage, but its origin is unclear, as well as to what extent it was used by intelligence services before it became popularized. Le Carré, a former British intelligence officer, said that the term "mole" was actually used by the Soviet intelligence agency, the KGB, and that a corresponding term used by Western intelligence services was sleeper agent. While the term mole had been applied to spies in the book Historie of the Reign of King Henry VII written in 1626 by Sir Francis Bacon, Le Carré said he did not get the term from that source.

== Overview ==
A mole may be recruited early in life, and take decades to get a job in government service and reach a position of access to secret information before becoming active as a spy. Perhaps the most famous examples of moles were the Cambridge Five, five upper-class British men recruited by the KGB as communist students at Cambridge University in the 1930s who later rose to high levels in various parts of the British government. By contrast, most espionage agents, such as CIA counterintelligence officer Aldrich Ames and FBI agent Robert Hanssen, who spied on the US government for the KGB, were either recruited or offered their services as spies after they were in place as members of the target organization.

Because their recruitment occurred in the remote past, moles are difficult for a nation's security services to detect. The possibility that a top politician, corporate executive, government minister, or officer in an intelligence service could be a mole working for a foreign government is the worst nightmare of counterintelligence services. For example, James Angleton, director of counterintelligence for the CIA between 1954 and 1975, was reportedly obsessed with suspicions that the top levels of Western governments were riddled with long-term communist agents and accused numerous politicians such as former U.S. Secretary of State Henry Kissinger, former Canadian prime ministers Lester Pearson and Pierre Trudeau, former British prime minister Harold Wilson and many members of Congress before he was removed in 1975.

Moles have been featured in numerous espionage films, television shows, video games and novels.

== Reasons for use ==
The most common procedure used by intelligence services to recruit agents is to find the location within the foreign government or organization of the information they want (the target), find out which people have access to it, and attempt to recruit one of them as a spy (espionage agent) to obtain the information. However, the people with access to top secret government information, who are government employees with high security clearances, are carefully monitored by the government's security apparatus for just that sort of espionage approach. Thus, it is difficult for a representative of the foreign intelligence service to meet with them clandestinely to recruit them. Private organizations, such as large corporations or terrorist groups, have similar security monitors.

In addition, the security clearance process weeds out employees who are openly disgruntled, ideologically disaffected, or otherwise having motives for betraying their country, so people in such positions are likely to reject recruitment as spies. Therefore, some intelligence services have tried to reverse the above process by first recruiting potential agents and then having them conceal their allegiance and pursue careers in the target government agency in the hope that they can reach positions of access to desired information.

Because the spy career of a mole is so long-term, sometimes occupying most of a lifetime, those who become moles must be highly motivated. One common motivation is ideology (political convictions). During the Cold War, a major source of moles in Western countries was so-called fellow travellers, Westerners who, in their youth during the 1920s to 1940s, became disaffected with their own governments and sympathetic to world communism without actually joining a communist party.

== See also ==
- Agent of influence
- Double agent
- Economic and industrial espionage
- Insider threat
- Jules C. Silber
- Spy cops scandal
- Traitor
- Whistleblower
- The Mole (TV series)
