= Jose Waldberg =

Josef Rudolf Waldberg (15 July 1915 – 10 December 1940), real name Henri Lassudry, was a Belgian national posing as a German (then aged 25), who, along with three accomplices, Karl Heinrich Meier, a Dutchman of German origin, Dutchman Charles Albert van der Kieboom, and Dutchman Sjoerd Pons were sent on an espionage mission to England. All four of them were caught. They were tried for treachery at the Old Bailey the previous month in front of Mr Justice Frederic Wrottesley. Waldberg, Meier, and Kieboom were found guilty, while Pons was acquitted. At the time, it was believed that Waldberg was German, albeit research has shown that he was Belgian.

Waldberg and Meier were both hanged at Pentonville Prison in London on 10 December 1940. Kieebom was hanged on 17 December 1940. These were the first executions under the Treachery Act. The spies were sent to Britain in preparation for the planned German invasion, which never arrived. When questioned by the Intelligence Services Waldberg told them that he would soon be in charge. At his trial Waldberg finally realised the seriousness of his situation and told the court that he'd only taken the mission because his father was in trouble with the Gestapo. Waldberg also admitted that he wasn't a fully trained spy, but that he was studying it. They both spoke good English, and carried papers showing them to be Dutch refugees from the Nazis.
