= Horst von der Goltz =

German spy and actor

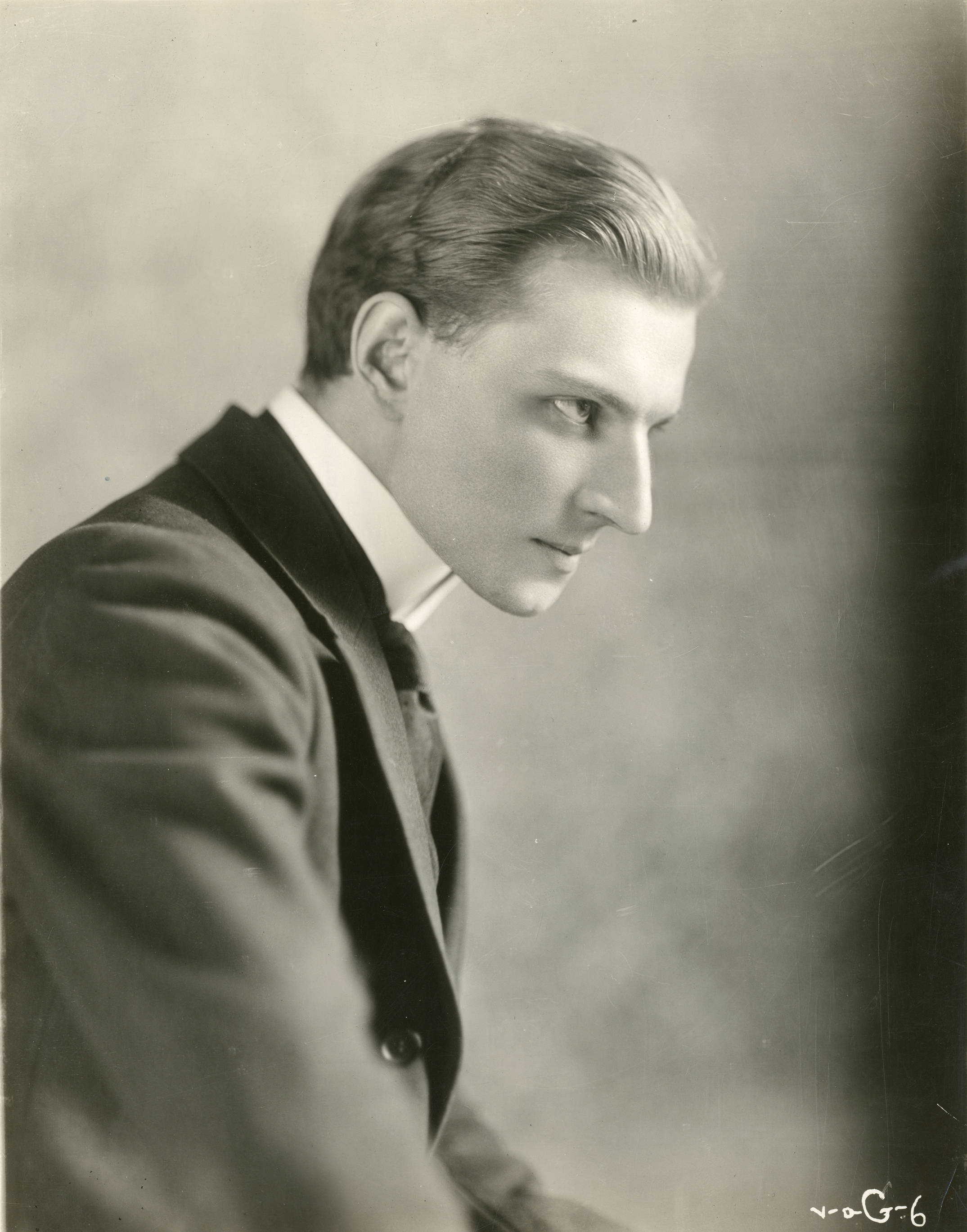
- Horst von der Goltz publicity shot
- Born: Franz Wachendorf; March 27, 1884; Koblenz, Germany
- Died: June 15, 1938 (aged 54); Laramie, Wyoming, U.S.
- Occupation: German counterintelligence agent
- Espionage activity
- Allegiance: Germany
- Codename: Tyler W. Bridgeman
- Codename: Vladyslav Bondarenko
- Codename: Frederick S. Palmer

Horst von der Goltz (born Franz Wachendorf in 1884 in Koblenz) was a German counterintelligence agent during World War I. In 1918, his autobiography, My Adventures as a German Secret Service Agent, was published. von der Goltz appeared as himself in a U.S. propaganda film written and directed by Raoul Walsh, The Prussian Cur, for Fox Film Corporation. The film was produced by the U.S. Committee on Public Information and designed to influence public opinion about the involvement of the United States in World War I.

== Life ==
At the age of 16, Wachendorf was deported from Brussels back to the German Empire. In 1911, apparently under the direction of the German intelligence service, he stole a draft of a confidential agreement between Mexico and Japan. This draft was leaked to the US, resulting in two-thirds of the U.S. Army converging on the southern border with Mexico. In 1912, Wachendorf moved to the US for the first time and served briefly in the United States Army.

Wachendorf also served in Pancho Villa's revolutionary army in Mexico and attained the rank of Major. To impress the Mexicans, he took the name Horst von der Goltz, the name under which he was detained together with other German mercenaries from Villa's opposition for a time in Chihuahua. The consul there began recruiting him to work in the espionage ring of Franz von Papen. After World War I began, on August 3, 1914, Wachendorf's commanding general, Raúl Madero, set him free for six months. Goltz met the German consul Otto Kueck in El Paso, Texas, who told him about the new Office of Military Attaché of Franz von Papen (for sabotage and subversion) in the Wall Street District of New York City, which he soon joined.

=== Attack on the Welland Canal ===
Papen and Goltz agreed that the Welland Canal, which connects Lake Erie and Lake Ontario, should be blown up because it was used to transport arms for the Entente. Papen gave Goltz $500 and a recommendation for Consul Carl A. Luederitz in Baltimore, who awarded him a passport in the name of Bridgeman W. Taylor. The Krupp representative in New York, Hans Tauscher, ordered—under the pretext of blowing up tree stumps on a farm—the dynamite for the attack from the DuPont Powder Company. Goltz had already hired some of his self-conspirators in Buffalo, New York, near the Canada–US border, when Papen stopped the attack on the Welland Canal. The saboteurs were forced to give up their plan due to strong Canadian efforts to protect the canal. According to contemporary reports, Goltz was recalled to Germany, as the U.S. passport he applied for on August 29, 1914, under his pseudonym Taylor, shows he used it on October 2, 1914. Using an Italian visa, he sailed on the SS Duca d'Aosta to Genoa and traveled on to Berlin, arriving three weeks after departure. Luederitz was later indicted for passport fraud for helping Goltz. Tauscher was acquitted of his part in the plan in June 1916.

=== Great Britain ===
On November 4, 1914 while working for the German Foreign Office and Abteilung III b, Goltz registered at a London hotel as Bridgeman Taylor of El Paso, Texas USA. Since he failed to register as a foreigner, he was arrested 10 days later. He was detained for six months because his U.S. passport had a German border stamp. In January 1915, Goltz gave William Reginald Hall, the head of British Naval Intelligence, insider information in the hope that he would be released early. However, the result was that his detention was extended to the end of the war. Apparently Hall, who met Goltz in person, felt Goltz was untrustworthy.

When the U.S. government made German military and naval attachés personae non gratae, Papen had to leave the country. In his luggage, which the British searched at sea, a number of secret documents were found, including a check for B. Taylor, which referred to Goltz by his real name, and a note saying that he was in England, under orders to serve in Britain. Scotland Yard now had proof Goltz was a German agent and he cooperated in face of the death penalty. To his advantage, the British were very interested in evidence of German espionage and sabotage activities in the U.S., to change the American neutral position. Goltz's affidavit, charging Papen and other co-conspirators, was withheld after consultation with the U.S. State Department. Goltz consented to appear as a witness in court and, in March 1916, he sailed back to America aboard USS Finland to testify. He arrived in New York City on March 28, 1916.

=== United States ===
Goltz's journey with Scotland Yard Detective Sergeant Harold Brust was supposed to remain secret, but during the trip he was extensively interviewed by the chief reporter of The New York Times and his story had already been reported before he arrived. The publicity forced the British Admiralty to make Goltz's statement available. As a key witness in the court proceedings, Goltz added to the perception of the Germans as "Dynamiters" in America and he heavily damaged the defense of the people involved. Hans Tauscher and Papen's representative Wolf von Igel were arrested, and diplomats Karl Boy-Ed and Consul Carl Lüderitz were accused of espionage, sabotage and passport offences. Tauscher was acquitted. For his service, Goltz was interned at Ellis Island instead of facing a British firing squad. Goltz was later granted asylum.

Goltz published a book in 1917. In 1918, he appeared in the Committee on Public Information propaganda film, The Prussian Cur (referring to Kaiser Wilhelm II). He played himself in the starring role.

== Published works ==
- Horst von der Goltz: Sworn statement by Horst von der Goltz, alias Bridgeman Taylor. H.M. Stationery Office. London. 1916. ASIN B000IU1VEQ.
- Horst von der Goltz: My Adventures as a German Secret Agent. Whitefish, Montana. Kessinger Publishing Co. 2005. ISBN 978-1-4179-2081-5 (First Edition: R.M. McBride & Co., New York, 1917) online London: Cassell and Company, Ltd. (1918), ISBN 978-1-4400-9240-4.
- von der Goltz, Horst (1992). True Stories Of The Great War: My Ten Years Of Intrigue In The Kaiser's Secret Service. Translated by Grace E. Bevir. History of the World.
- CPI – Propaganda film: The Prussian Cur (Der preußische Hundesohn). Fox Film Company. USA 1918. Drehbuch/Regie: Raoul Walsh, Goltz plays himself

== See also ==
- Hindu–German Conspiracy
- SS Kroonland
