= Wolf von Igel =

Accused spy

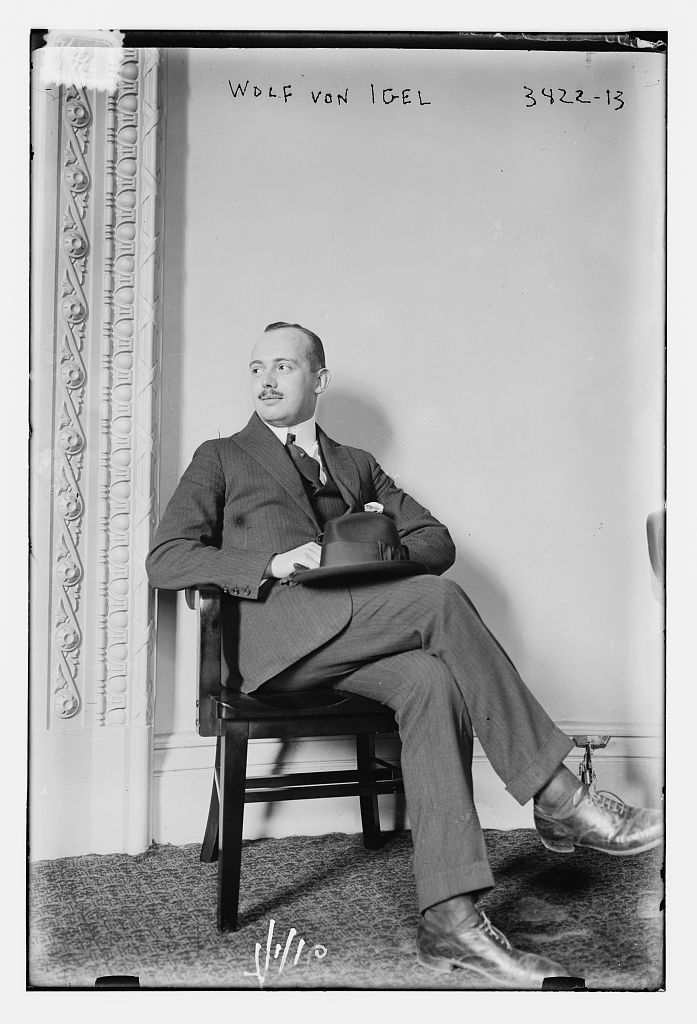
Wolf von Igel in 1915

Wolf Walter Franz von Igel (11 January 1888 – 17 May 1970) was an accused spy from 1916. He was an aide to spy Franz von Papen.

== Biography ==
In 1916, Wolf von Igel was indicted by Hudson Snowden Marshall, the United States Attorney for the Southern District of New York, on charges of spying. Under his direction, Dr. Walter T. Scheele, Captain von Kleist, Captain Wolpert of the Atlas Steamship Company, and Captain Rode of the Hamburg-American Line manufactured incendiary bombs to be used for sabotage. Igel claimed diplomatic immunity.
