= Otto Kueck =

Otto Kueck (1878 – March 1915) was a German businessman, agent, and diplomat in Chihuahua City, Mexico. He was the German consul of the city between 1908 and 1914, when Pancho Villa expelled him because of his support of Victoriano Huerta. He not only served in the German diplomatic corps but also was a German secret service agent and recruiter. The best known German spies who worked for him were Felix A. Sommerfeld and Horst von der Goltz. Kueck was succeeded by Ernst Goeldner and died in March 1915 in Los Angeles as a result of a heart attack.

== Biography ==
Born in 1878 in Hamburg, Germany, Kueck emigrated to Mexico at the turn of the century. He worked for the merchant house of Ketelsen and Degetau in Ciudad Juárez. The owner of the store was Emil Ketelsen, a wealthy businessman in Chihuahua, German consul and leader of the German community of the state. Kueck married Ketelson's daughter Emilie. When Ketelsen died in 1905, Kueck took over the diplomatic representation of the German community in Chihuahua as Vice Consul. Ketelsen left his daughter a sizeable fortune, a third of an estimated one million Pesos (approximately $11 Million in today's value).

Kueck returned to Germany in 1906 to recover from a liver illness. Very likely it is between 1906 and 1908 that he entered the service of the Ettappendienst der Marine, the precursor to the German naval intelligence service. When he returned to Chihuahua in 1908 he had orders to establish contact with the burgeoning anti-reelection opposition forming against the Mexican dictator Porfirio Díaz. It is unclear whether Kueck recruited Felix A. Sommerfeld, who came to Chihuahua around the same time, or received orders to be Sommerfeld's secret service handler in Chihuahua. Certain is that Kueck maneuvered Sommerfeld close to the future president of Mexico, Francisco I. Madero. In 1911, at the initiative of Sommerfeld, Kueck received a promotion to full consul. Kueck also had involvement with the notorious World War I sabotage agent Horst von der Goltz. Von der Goltz appeared in Chihuahua around 1913. According to von der Goltz' memoirs, Kueck recommended him to the German military attache in Washington, Franz von Papen.

At the outbreak of the Mexican Revolution in Chihuahua in 1911, troops believed to be Villistas ransacked and burned the Ketelsen and Degetau store in Ciudad Juárez in the course of the Battle of Ciudad Juárez (1911). This act turned most of the German community against Madero's government, including Otto Kueck. When Madero died in a coup d'état in the Ten Tragic Days in February 1913, Kueck began to support the new Mexican government under Victoriano Huerta. When the Constitutionalists under the leadership of Venustiano Carranza defeated Huerta in 1914, Pancho Villa expelled the German consul for his support of the usurper president. Kueck fled to Los Angeles, California where he died from a heart attack in March 1915.
