= Maria de Victorica =

German WWI spy

Madame Maria de Victorica
- Born: Maria von Kretschmann; 1878; Posen, Prussia
- Died: August 12, 1920 (aged 41–42); New York City, United States
- Resting place: Gates of Heaven Cemetery, Kensico, New York
- Occupation: German spy
- Known for: espionage

Madame Maria de Victorica, or Baroness Maria von Kretschmann, (1878, Posen, Prussia - 1920, New York, United States) was the daughter of a Prussian cavalry officer, Baron Hans von Kretschmann, and Countess Jenny von Gustedt, a diplomat. She was also the granddaughter of the illegitimate child of Jenny von Pappenheim and Jérome Bonaparte. She is known for her espionage activities during World War I. She also used the alias Marie de Vussière, and was said to dominate many European languages with fluency and had many university degrees.

She came to South America when she was 25 years old, to visit some relatives living in the continent. Once she was here, apparently she married with the first of her three husbands, although his identity isn't clear. Some source states that she married an Argentinean man that died shortly after marriage, but some other sources state that her last husband was, indeed, an Argentinean man called José Manuel Gustave de Victorica, arrested in Pontalier, France, on 10 January 1917 and charged with espionage. This latest version seems to be the most accurate.

She was accused of being involved in plot actions, mostly to organize disturbs amongst the Irish community living in the United States, and to import high explosives into the U.S. by means of hollow figurines of Saints and the Virgin Mary. She was a noble, fashionable and rich woman, and that was part of her strategy to move inside the United States. Even her most fashionable clothes served as a masquerade to hide her espionage actions, for example the usage of silk mufflers to hide invisible ink in which to write secret messages to other German spies.

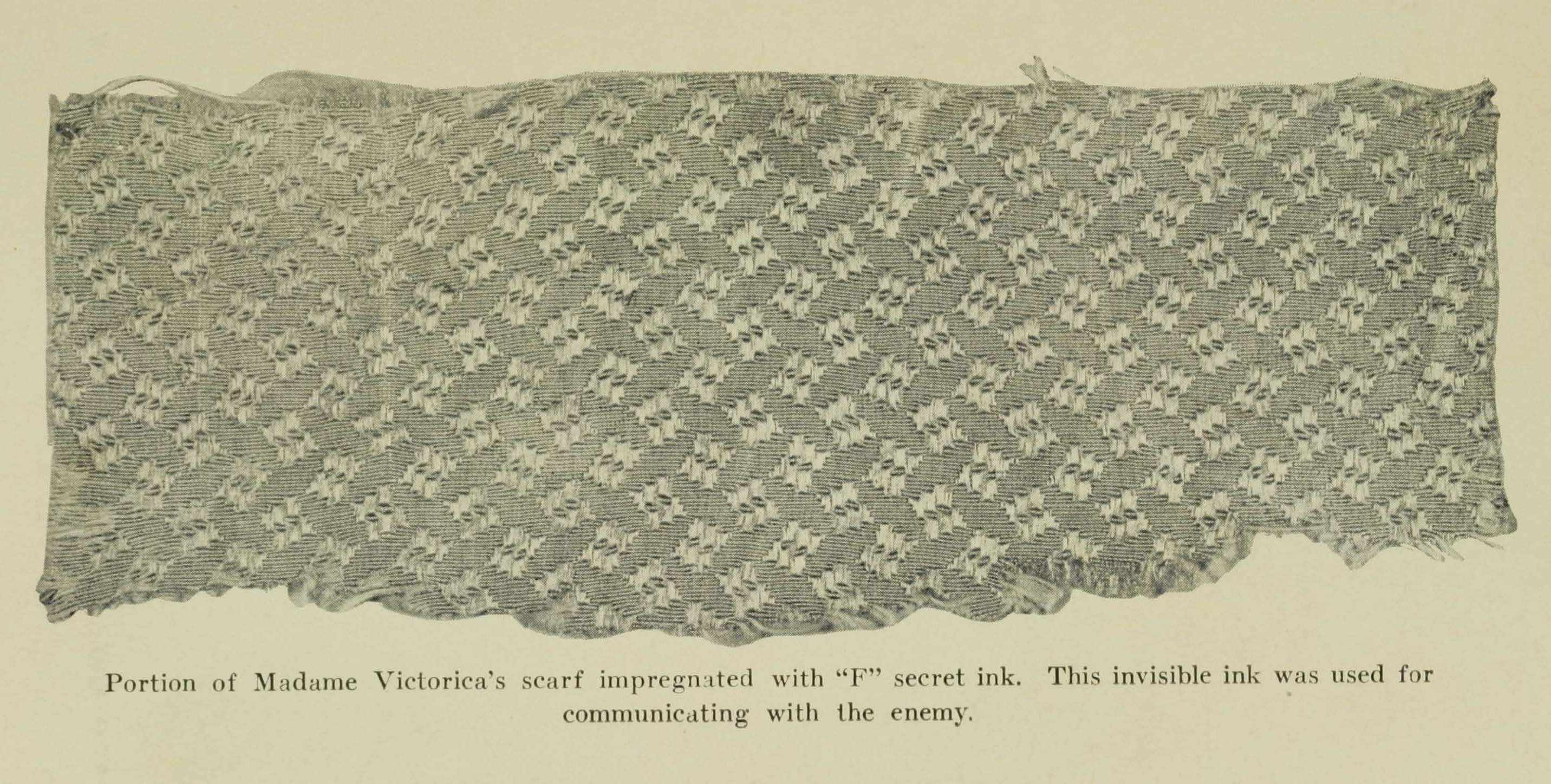
Portion of the scarf used by Mme. Victorica, which contained German secret ink. ca. 1917.

She was under the direction of Herman Wessels, but Herbert Yardley stated that her intelligence was superior to her masculine boss. In his memoirs about his service at MI-8, called The American Black Chamber, Yardley devoted an entire chapter to describe the plot of Mme. Victorica, and wrote about her that

Earlier, when I made the statement that German espionage was subtle -this was what I meant. But that this was feminine and not masculine subtlety I have not the faintest doubt. It is too much to believe that Madame Victorica's masculine master was so clever. [...] It is clear enough that Madame Victorica is the directing genius of German espionage in the United States, and that her arrest will seriously cripple the activities of the group she controls. [...] Though a pathetic figure in death, may she remain immortal in the annals of espionage.

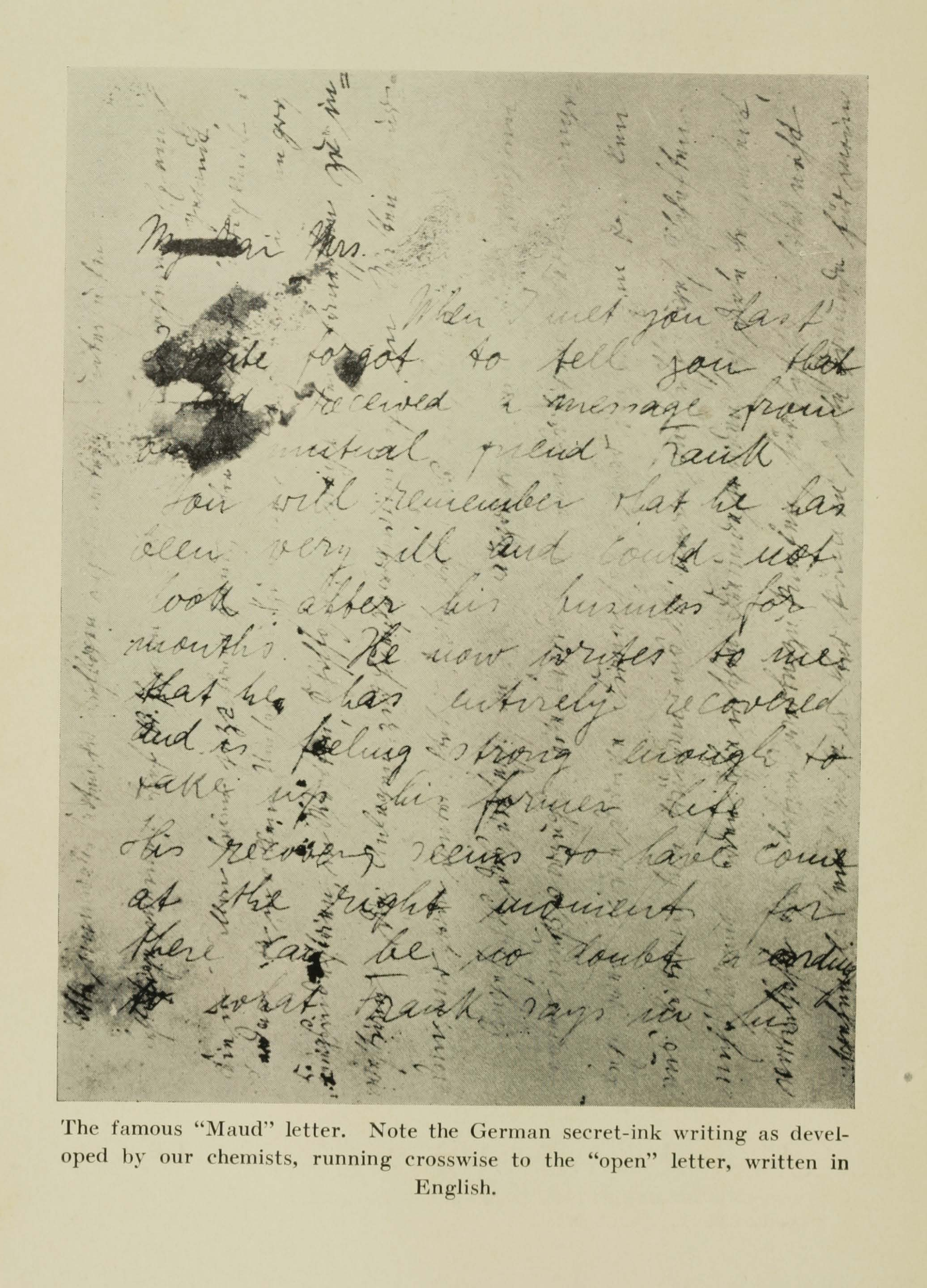
The Maud letter of Mme. Victorica, written in German secret ink. ca. 1917.

However, the digitized copy belonging to the Rufus A. Long Digital Archive of Cryptology has notations made by other specialists in cryptanalysis, like William F. Friedman, or Charles J. Mendelsohn. There are several notations made in this particular chapter, most of them belonging to A. J. M. Grail, in charge of secret ink section, Captain, MID, Washington, during World War. In those notations, made by Grail, it's stated that "Victorica was quite harmless. She accomplished nothing. She arrived here 22, Jan, 1917 and was arrested 21 April 1918.", that "The plot (of introducing explosives into holy figures) was suggested to Victorica not by her", that she wasn't from a noble origin, but rather a Junker, and finally that "I believe Victorica gave our people in N.Y.C. much information (...), she did not give much accurate information, perhaps out of ignorance." Charles J. Mendelsohn, in charge of German diplomatic code solving section, MID, Washington, also added at the end of the chapter that "It is my impression that Victorica was captured by the Dept. of Justice, plus that the cipher stuff came as a consequence of the capture, not the capture as a consequence of the cipher stuff. V. Weiskopf could throw light on this."

On 27 April 1918 she was arrested, supposedly after MI-8 secret-ink subsection found a correspondence that detailed a plan to destroy docks, war industries, and mercury mines. She disclosed some information about the rest of the conspirators, but she also lied a lot during the examination. She was a heavy user of morphine. At her arraignment in New York, prosecutors had to procure morphine for her to be able to testify. After testifying for the government against Jeremiah O'Leary in 1919, she was released from prison. O'Leary used the morphine addiction to discredit her testimony against him. She died of pneumonia in a New York sanitarium on August 12, 1920.
