= Jules C. Silber =

German spy during World War I

Jules Crawford Silber (c.1885–1939) was a German mole inside the mail censorship division of British Intelligence during the First World War. He remains well known for never having been caught.

== Biography ==
He was born in Breslau, in Prussian Silesia, around 1885. As a teenager, he emigrated to South Africa, where he learnt English, Afrikaans and Zulu.

During the Second Anglo-Boer War, the British used his services as an interpreter and an agent in mail censorship. About 1,500 prisoners of war from the Boer Commandos were sent to Ceylon and India and Silber went there with them as an agent of censor for 18 months. He served as a city-garrison of Abbottabad near the Afghan border.

When repatriation of prisoners began after the Treaty of Vereeniging and Silber returned to South Africa, where he resided for another 2 years.

== First World War ==
He later emigrated to the United States, where he lived for a few years, however he couldn't find a job because of his qualifications. When war between the United Kingdom and Germany was declared in 1914 Silber felt patriotism.

Thinking of the best way to help his country, he decided to travel to the United Kingdom and infiltrate British intelligence. Before leaving New York City, he gave his letter-box's address to ambassador to the United States and high-level spymaster, Count Johann Heinrich von Bernstorff.

Not holding a valid passport to reach London, he first travelled to Canada. Counterintelligence in Canada was more lax because the Canadian people were still considered British subjects. Silber carried official British documents, however, that showed his military service in South Africa and India, none of which mentioned his German nationality. He spent some time in Montreal, learning to pass as a French Canadian as a disguise.

He set sail for England on September 19, 1914, arriving 10 days later without a passport, and was interrogated in Manchester. Eventually, he was permitted to enter the United Kingdom and travelled to London later that evening. Although he had yet to commit any acts of espionage, he had already carried out an exploit, because he was a German who had managed to enter the United Kingdom during the war.

Obstructing MI5 investigations, he obtained a position at the mail censor's office after an interview by a British Army Colonel who had also served in Punjab region. They discovered several common interests, and Silber began his work as a mail censor on October 12, 1914.

Using mailed window envelopes that had already been stamped and cleared he was able to forward microfilm to Germany that contained increasingly important information. Silber was regularly promoted and ended up in the position of chief censor, which enabled him to analyze all suspicious documents.

One of his most high risk successes involved investigating and then informing the Imperial German Navy about the Royal Navy's use of Q-ships to sink German U-boats.

Once the war ended, Silber had to wait until 1925 for restrictions on voyages to the continent to be reduced so that he could return to the Weimar Republic.

== Autobiography ==
He spent his days in Germany after having written an autobiographical account of his life entitled The Invisible Weapons, in 1932. Based on this autobiography, the author Ronald Seth wrote The Spy Who Wasn't Caught, a book recounting the exploits of this master of espionage who was probably forgotten because he was the most intelligent of all the spies. The French version of this book, published in 1968, was titled Le Plus Anglais des espions allemands (The Most English of German Spies).

== Works ==
- The Invisible Weapons, Hutchinson, 1932, Londres, D639S8S5.
- Die Anderen Waffen : Mit Zwei Faksimilies, Korn, Breslau, Germany, 1932. D639S8S48
- Les Armes invisibles. souvenirs d'un espion allemand au war office de 1914 a 1919, Payot, Paris, 1933. A collection of memories, studies, and documents to better serve the history of the first world war.
