= Frederic Wrottesley =

Sir Frederic John Wrottesley (20 March 1880 – 14 November 1948) was a British lawyer and judge.

Wrottesley was educated at Tonbridge School and Lincoln College, Oxford, where he read Mods and Greats. He was called to the bar by the Inner Temple in 1907, and practised at the parliamentary bar. In 1910, he published two books: The Law and Practice of Criminal Appeals, and The Examination of Witnesses in Court. During World War I, he served with the Royal Field Artillery, reaching the rank of major and being mentioned in despatches.

He took silk in 1926 and became Recorder of Wolverhampton in 1930.

He was appointed to the King's Bench Division of the High Court in 1937, receiving the customary knighthood the same year. In 1947 he was made a Lord Justice of Appeal and appointed to the Privy Council, but was forced to retire in 1948 for health reasons.
