= Miralles =

Miralles is a surname. Notable people with the surname include:

- Albert Miralles (born 1982), Spanish basketball player
- Alberto Miralles (1940–2004), Spanish dramatist
- Ana Miralles (born 1959), Spanish comic books artist
- Bernabé Zapata Miralles (born 1997), Spanish tennis player
- Enric Miralles (1955–2000), Spanish architect
- Evelyn Miralles (born 1966), Venezuelan-American engineer
- Ezequiel Miralles (born 1983), Argentine footballer
- Francisco Miralles:
  - Francesc Miralles i Galaup (1848–1901), Spanish painter
  - Francisco Miralles (writer) (1837–1890), Chilean engineer, painter and writer
  - Francisco Miralles Arnau (1871–1932), dancer, choreographer and Spanish and classical dance teacher
  - Francesc Miralles (born 1968), Catalan writer, essayist, translator, and musician
- Jesús Miralles (born 1912), Cuban pitcher
- Joan Jordi Miralles (born 1977), Spanish novelist, playwright, and screenwriter
- Jordi Miralles (1962–2015), Spanish politician
- Julián Miralles (born 1965), Spanish motorcycle racer
- Marc Miralles (born 1997), Spanish field hockey player
- Pedro Miralles (1955–1993), Spanish industrial designer and architect
- Román Miralles (born 1983), Argentine rugby union player
