= Abwehr =

German armed forces intelligence service (1920–1944)

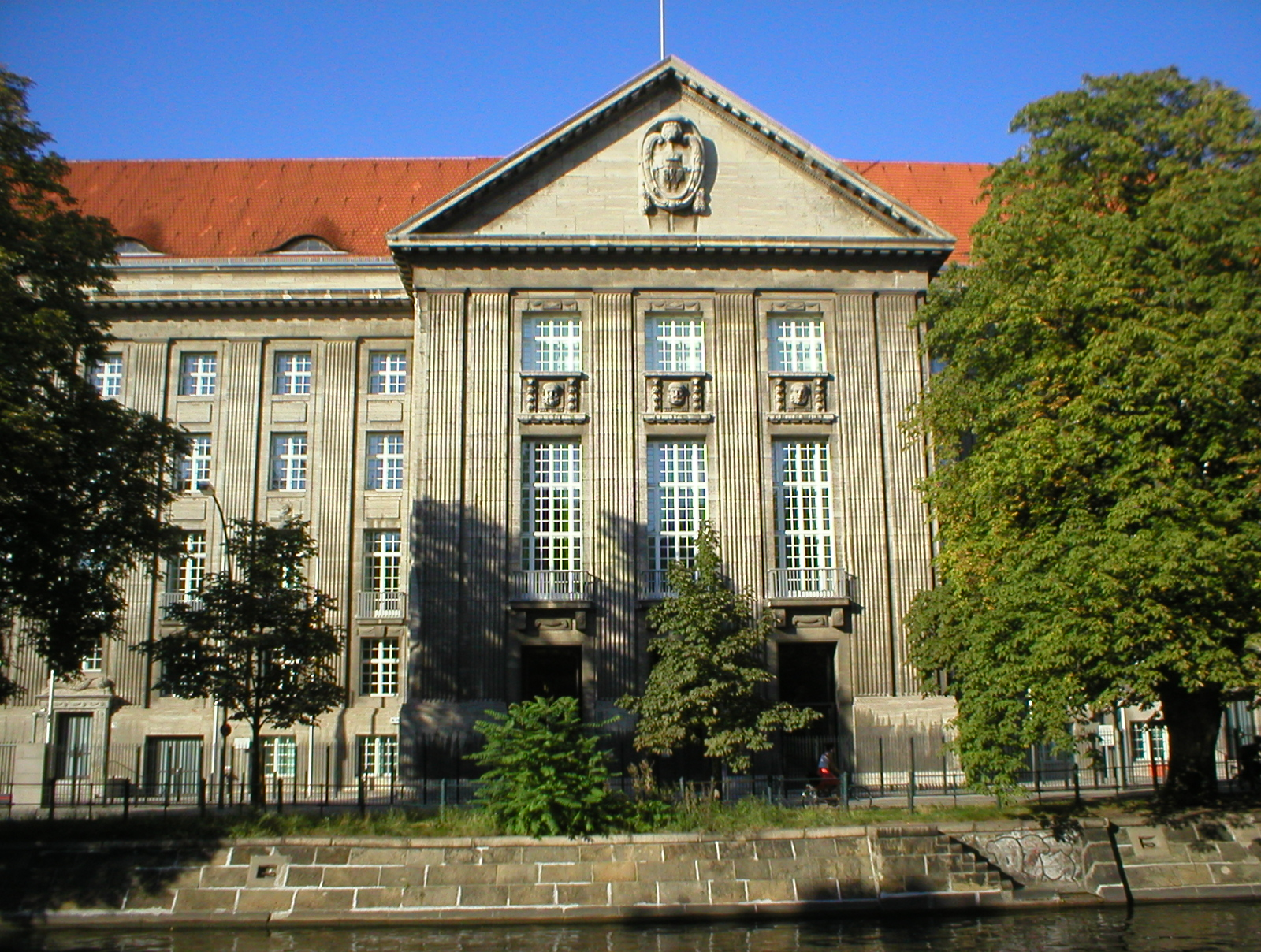
- Entrance to the Bendlerblock, the headquarters of the Abwehr
- Active: 1920–1944
- Country: Germany
- Branch: Reichswehr; Wehrmacht
- Type: Military intelligence
- Part of: Oberkommando der Wehrmacht
- Headquarters: Bendlerblock, Berlin
- Engagements: World War II

Commanders
- Commanders: See list

The Abwehr (pronounced [ˈapveːɐ̯]; German for "resistance" or "defence", though the word usually means "counterintelligence" in a military context) was the German military-intelligence service for the Reichswehr and the Wehrmacht from 1920 to 1944. (Note: Originally formed in 1866, the early manifestation of the Prussian Abwehr predates the modern German state and originated to collect intelligence information for the Prussian government during a war with neighboring Austria. See: Lerner & Lerner, eds. (2004). Encyclopedia of Espionage, Intelligence, and Security, vol. 1, A–E, p. 2.) Although the 1919 Treaty of Versailles prohibited the Weimar Republic from establishing an intelligence organization of their own, (Note: In particular, the British and the French vehemently opposed Germany having any form of intelligence services and attempted to institute as many restrictions as possible on the Abwehr.) they formed an espionage group in 1920 within the Ministry of Defence, calling it the Abwehr. (Note: The term Abwehr, German for 'ward-off', was chosen to emphasize the defensive character of this department of the Reichswehr Ministry following the First World War.) The initial purpose of the Abwehr was defense against foreign espionage: an organizational role that later evolved considerably. Under General Kurt von Schleicher (prominent in running the Reichswehr from 1926 onwards) the individual military services' intelligence units were combined and, in 1929, centralized under Schleicher's Ministeramt within the Ministry of Defence, forming the foundation for the more commonly understood manifestation of the Abwehr.

Each Abwehr station throughout Germany was based on the local army district (Wehrkreis); more offices opened in amenable neutral countries and (as the greater Reich expanded) in the occupied territories. On 4 February 1938, the Ministry of Defence—renamed the Ministry of War in 1935—was dissolved and became the Oberkommando der Wehrmacht (OKW) with Hitler in direct command. The OKW formed part of the Führer's personal "working staff" from June 1938 and the Abwehr became its intelligence agency under Vice-Admiral Wilhelm Canaris. (Note: The OKW did not establish an Intelligence Branch in its Operations Staff until 1943, at which time it consisted of only three officers.) The Abwehr had its headquarters at 76/78 Tirpitzufer (the present-day Reichpietschufer) in Berlin, adjacent to the offices of the OKW. (Note: Despite the location of its HQ, in reality, the power lay in the field via each "Abwehrstelle" or "Ast" of the Abwehr – see section titled 1938 reorganization.)

== Before Canaris ==
The Abwehr was created in 1920 as part of the German Ministry of Defence when the German government was allowed to form the Reichswehr, the military organization of the Weimar Republic. The first head of the Abwehr was Major Friedrich Gempp, a former deputy to Colonel Walter Nicolai, the head of German intelligence during World War I, who proved mostly ineffectual. At that time it was composed of only three officers and seven former officers, plus a clerical staff. When Gempp became a general, he was promoted out of the job as chief, to be followed by Major Günther Schwantes, whose term as the organization's leader was also brief. Many members of the Reichswehr (a significant portion of them Prussian) declined when asked to consider intelligence work, since for them, it was outside the realm of actual military service and the act of spying clashed with their Prussian military sensibilities of always showing themselves direct, loyal, and sincere. By the 1920s, the slowly growing Abwehr was organised into three sections:

1. Reconnaissance
2. Cipher and Radio Monitoring
3. Counterespionage

The Reichsmarine intelligence staff merged with the Abwehr in 1928. While the Treaty of Versailles forbade Germany from engaging in any form of espionage or spying, during the Nazi era the Abwehr disregarded this prohibition, as they saw it as hypocritical.

In the 1930s, with the rise of the Nazi movement, the Ministry of Defence was reorganized; surprisingly, on 7 June 1932, a naval officer, Captain Conrad Patzig, was named chief of the Abwehr, even though it was staffed largely by army officers. Proving himself quite a capable chief, Patzig swiftly assured the military of his intentions and worked to earn their respect; he established good connections with the Lithuanian clandestine service against the Soviets, forged relations with other foreign agencies—except for Italy, whose cipher he distrusted. His successes did not stop the other branches of the military services from developing their own intelligence staff.

After the Nazis seized power, the Abwehr began sponsoring reconnaissance flights across the border with Poland, under the direction of Patzig, but this led to confrontations with Heinrich Himmler, head of the SS. Army leaders also feared that the flights would endanger the secret plans for an attack on Poland. Adolf Hitler ordered the termination of the overflights in 1934 after he signed a nonaggression treaty with Poland since these reconnaissance missions might be discovered and jeopardize the treaty. Patzig was fired in January 1935 as a result, and sent to command the new pocket battleship Admiral Graf Spee; he later became Chief of Naval Personnel. His replacement was another Reichsmarine captain, Wilhelm Canaris.

== Under Canaris ==
=== Before World War II ===
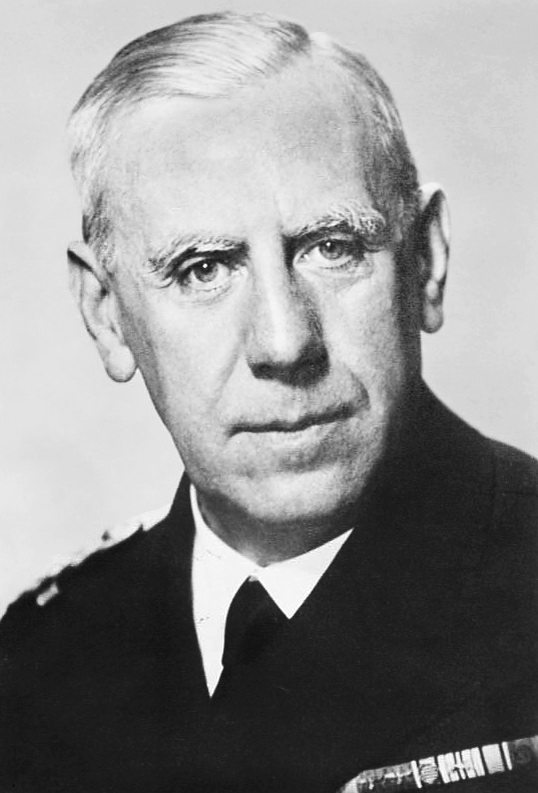
Wilhelm Canaris

Before he took over the Abwehr on 1 January 1935, the soon-to-be Admiral Canaris was warned by Patzig of attempts by Himmler and Reinhard Heydrich to take over all German intelligence organizations. Heydrich, who headed the Sicherheitsdienst (SD) from 1931, had a negative attitude towards the Abwehr – shaped in part by his belief that Germany's defeat in the First World War was primarily attributable to failures of military intelligence, (Note: A view Heydrich acquired from Walter Nicolai's 1923 book, Geheime Mächte, in which the author argues that Imperial Germany lost the war as a result of not having a capable intelligence agency comparable to the ones operated by Britain and France.) and by his ambitions to control all political intelligence-gathering for Germany.

Canaris, a master of backroom dealings, thought he knew how to deal with Heydrich and Himmler. Though he tried to maintain a cordial relationship with them, the antagonism between the Abwehr and the SS did not stop when Canaris took over. Not only was competition with Heydrich and Himmler's intelligence operations a hindrance but so too were the redundant attempts by multiple organizations to control communications intelligence (COMINT) for the Reich. For instance, Canaris's Abwehr controlled the Armed Forces Deciphering operation, while the navy maintained its listening service, known as the B-Dienst. Further complicating COMINT matters, the Foreign Office also had its own communications security branch, the Pers Z S.

Matters came to a head in 1937 when Hitler decided to help Joseph Stalin in the latter's purge of the Soviet military. Hitler ordered that the German Army staff should be kept in the dark about Stalin's intentions, for fear that they would warn their Soviet counterparts due to their long-standing relations. Accordingly, special SS teams, accompanied by burglary experts from the criminal police, broke into the secret files of the General Staff and the Abwehr and removed documents related to German-Soviet collaboration. To conceal the thefts, fires were started at the break-ins, which included Abwehr headquarters.

=== 1938 reorganisation ===
Before the reorganization of the OKW in 1938, the Abwehr was merely a department within the Reichswehrministerium (Ministry of Armed Forces), and it was not until after Canaris was appointed chief that its numbers increased and it gained some independence. Experiencing an explosion of sorts in personnel, the Abwehr went from fewer than 150 employees to nearly one thousand between 1935 and 1937. Canaris reorganized the agency in 1938, subdividing the Abwehr into three main sections:

- The Central Division (also called Department Z – "Abteilung Z" or "die Zentrale" in German): acted as the controlling brain for the other two sections, as well as handling personnel and financial matters, including the payment of agents. Throughout Canaris's tenure it was headed by Generalmajor Hans Oster.
- The Foreign Branch, ("Amtsgruppe Ausland" in German) (later known as Foreign Intelligence Group) was the second subdivision of the Abwehr and had several functions:
  1. liaison with the OKW and the general staff of the services,
  2. coordination with the German Foreign Ministry on military matters, and
  3. evaluation of captured documents and evaluation of foreign press and radio broadcasts.

This liaison with the OKW meant that the Foreign Branch was the appropriate channel to request Abwehr support for a particular mission.

- Abwehr constituted the third division and was labeled "counter-intelligence branches" but in reality focused on intelligence gathering. It was subdivided into the following areas and responsibilities:
  - I. Foreign Intelligence Collection (further subdivided by letter, e.g. Abwehr I-Ht)
    G: false documents, photos, links, passports, chemicals
    H West: army west (Anglo-American Army intelligence)
    H Ost: army east (Soviet Army intelligence)
    Ht: technical army intelligence
    I: communications – design of wireless sets, wireless operators
    K: computer/cryptanalysis operations
    L: air intelligence
    M: naval intelligence
    T/lw: technical air intelligence
    Wi: economic intelligence
    Attached to Abwehr I. was Gruppe I-T for technical intelligence. Initially Abwehr I–K was a technical research unit, a small fraction the size of its British counterpart, Bletchley Park. Its importance later grew during the war to match its British counterpart in size and capability.
  - II. Sabotage: tasked with directing covert contact/exploitation of discontented minority groups in foreign countries for intelligence purposes.
    Attached to Abwehr II. was the Brandenburg Regiment, an offshoot of Gruppe II-T (Technical Intelligence), and unconnected to any other branch outside of Abwehr II. Gruppe II-T. (Note: Sometimes referred to as the 'Brandenburgers' of 'Brandenburger Regiment', the Brandenburg Regiment was the first German special forces unit similar to the British Commandos.)
  - III. Counter-intelligence division: responsible for counter-intelligence operations in German industry, planting false information, penetration of foreign intelligence services, and investigating acts of sabotage on German soil. Attached to Abwehr III. were:
    - IIIC: Civilian Authority bureau
    - IIIC-2: Espionage cases bureau
    - IIID: Disinformation bureau
    - IIIF: Counter espionage agents bureau
    - IIIN: Postal bureau

Abwehr liaisons were also established with the army, navy, and Luftwaffe High Commands, and these liaisons would pass on specific intelligence requests to the operational sections of the Abwehr.

Abwehr I was commanded by Colonel Hans Pieckenbrock, Abwehr II was commanded by Colonel Erwin von Lahousen and Abwehr III was commanded by Colonel Franz-Eccard von Bentivegni (1896–1958). These three officers formed the core of the Abwehr.

=== Ast / Abwehrstelle ===
Under the structure outlined above, the Abwehr placed a local station in each military district in Germany, ("Wehrkreis"), called 'Abwehrstelle' or 'Ast'. Following the German Table of Organisation and Equipment (Note: TO&E being the exact listing of what was deemed necessary for any German military unit to be at full operational strength. An exception to this TO&E directive existed in Hamburg which had no permanent Abwehr II presence.) model of Abwehr headquarters, each Ast was usually subdivided into sections for

1. espionage
2. sabotage
3. counter-intelligence

Typically each Ast would be commanded by a senior army or naval officer and would be answerable to Abwehr HQ. in Berlin. Operations carried out by each Ast would be in tandem with the overall strategic plan formulated by Admiral Canaris. Canaris in turn would receive instructions on what intelligence gathering should take priority from the OKW or, increasingly after 1941, Hitler directly. In practice, each Ast was given considerable latitude in mission planning and execution—a facet of the organization that ultimately damaged its intelligence-gathering capability.

Each local Ast could recruit potential agents for missions and the Abwehr also employed freelance recruiters to groom and vet potential agents. In most cases, the agents were recruited civilians, not officers/soldiers from the military. The recruitment emphasis seems to have been very much on "quantity" not "quality". The poor quality of recruits often led to the failure of Abwehr missions. (Note: Evidence of the Abwehr's substandard performance related to recruiting is mentioned in once classified American military documents. See German Espionage and Sabotage against the United States. O.N.I. Review [Office of Naval Intelligence] 1, no. 3 (Jan. 1946): 33–38. [Declassified]. Full text online and retrievable from "German Espionage and Sabotage Against the U.S. In World War II". Archived from the original on 2001-12-05. (Accessed December 20, 2014).)

=== Operational structure in neutral countries ===
In neutral countries, the Abwehr frequently disguised its organization by attaching personnel to the German Embassy or to trade missions. Such postings were referred to as "War Organisations" ("Kriegsorganisationen" or "KO's" in German). In neutral but friendly Spain for example, the Abwehr had both an Ast and a KO while Ireland had neither. In friendly countries of interest, occupied countries, or in Germany, the intelligence service would normally organize "Abwehr sub-stations" ("Abwehrleitstellen" or "Alsts" in German), or "Abwehr adjoining posts" ("Abwehrnebenstellen" in German). The "Alsts" would fall under the jurisdiction of the geographically appropriate Ast, which in turn would be supervised by the Central division in Berlin. For a while, the KOs were tolerated by the neutral countries and those who feared Germany too much to protest but as the Allied powers waged war against Germany, many of the KOs were simply expelled at the host countries request—due at least in part to pressure from the Allies.

== Pre-war operations ==
Before the war began, the Abwehr was fairly active and effective as it built a wide range of contacts; they developed links with the Ukrainians opposed to the Soviet regime, conducted meetings with Indian nationalists working against British rule in India, and established an information-sharing agreement with the Japanese. There was even some significant penetration into the extent of the United States industrial capacity and economic potential, and data was collected by the Abwehr concerning American military capacity and contingency planning.

Sometime in March 1937, senior Abwehr officer Paul Thümmel provided a vast array of significant information about the German intelligence services to Czech agents who in turn, forwarded the data to SIS London, whom they codenamed agent A-54. Thümmel provided data about "military capabilities, and intentions" as well as "detailed information on the organization and structure of the Abwehr and SD" along with "the near-complete order of battle of the Wehrmacht and Luftwaffe, and German mobilization plans"; and, later "he gave advanced warnings of the German annexation of the Sudetenland as well as the invasions of Czechoslovakia and Poland."

After the assumption of absolute control over the OKW in February 1938, Hitler declared that he did not want men of intelligence under his command, but men of brutality, an observation which did not sit well with Canaris. Whether he was deeply troubled by Hitler's comment or not, Canaris and the Abwehr still busied themselves preparing the ideological groundwork for the annexation of Austria which occurred in March 1938.

A month later, Canaris and the Abwehr were set to work subverting the Czechs as part of Hitler's strategy to acquire the Sudetenland. Before the spring of 1938 came to an end, the conservative members of the German Foreign Office and many ranking officers in the military began sharing their fears over an impending international disaster and the threat of another catastrophic European war based on Hitler's actions. A conspiratorial group formed around General Erwin von Witzleben and Admiral Canaris as a result. Throughout the process, Canaris and subordinates such as Helmuth Groscurth worked to prevent war to the extent feasible. Meanwhile, Canaris participated in the plots among the military leadership for a coup against Hitler and attempted to open up covert communication lines with the British, convinced that Hitler would push Europe to war. Before the actual invasion of Poland occurred, the Abwehr went so far as to send a special emissary, Ewald von Kleist-Schmenzin, to London in order to warn them. Subverting the Nazi government with warnings to the Allies was but one part of the picture, as this move did not stop or deter Canaris from obeying Hitler's orders to provide 150 Polish army uniforms and small arms to Himmler and Heydrich for their staged attack on a German radio station by 'Polish' forces; one act which Hitler used to justify his assault on Poland.

== During World War II ==
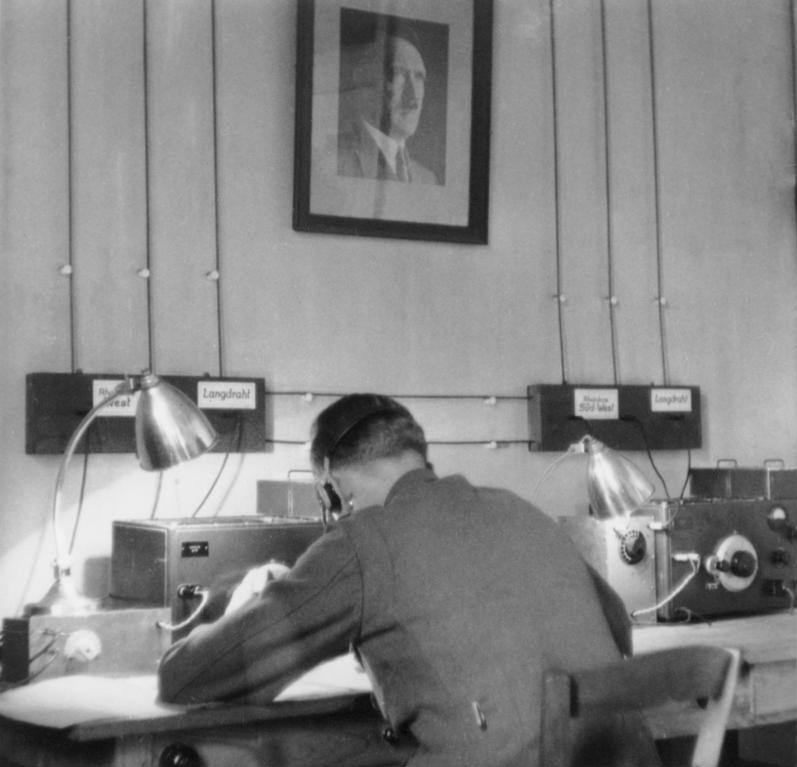
OKW secret radio service

=== Early successes ===
Under Canaris, the Abwehr expanded and proved to be efficient during the early years of the war. Its most notable success was Operation Nordpol, which was an operation against the Dutch underground network, which at the time was supported by the Special Operations Executive. Concomitant to the period known as the Phoney War, the Abwehr collected information on Denmark and Norway. Shipping in and out of Danish and Norwegian ports was placed under observation and over 150,000 tons of shipping was destroyed as a result. Agents in Norway and Denmark successfully penetrated their military thoroughly enough to determine the disposition and strength of land forces in both countries and deep-cover Abwehr operatives kept the German forces, particularly the Luftwaffe, intimately informed during the invasion of Norway. Against both of these nations, the Abwehr mounted what one would call a successful intelligence operation of some scale and proved itself critical to the success of German military endeavors there.

Fear over the drastically low levels of available petroleum at the beginning of 1940 prompted activity from the German Foreign Office and the Abwehr in an attempt to ameliorate the problem "by concluding an unprecedented arms-for-oil" deal, brokered to push back the "Anglo-French dominance in the Ploiești oilfield." Abwehr operatives also played on Romanian fears, making them more amenable to Hitler's offer to shield them from the Soviets—through which the Germans acquired cheap oil. In this regard, the Abwehr provided some semblance of economic utility for the Nazi regime.

In March 1941, the Germans forced a captured SOE radio operator to transmit messages to Britain in a code that the Germans had obtained. Even though the operator gave indications that he was compromised, the receiver in Britain did not notice. Thus the Germans were able to penetrate the Dutch operation and maintained this state of affairs for two years, capturing agents, and sending false intelligence and sabotage reports until the British caught on. In Bodyguard of Lies Anthony Brown suggests that the British were well aware that the radios were compromised and used this method to feed false information to the Germans regarding the site of the D-Day landings.

Hitler sent Canaris as a special envoy to Madrid during the early summer of 1940 to convince Spain to join in the coming fight against the Allies, for which Gibraltar could have strategic military value. The repeat visit, in December 1940, was a failure; Franco, for various political and military reasons, was not ready to join the German war effort. Canaris reported that Franco would not commit Spanish forces until England collapsed.

=== Underestimating the enemy and the Commissar Order ===
Initial estimates of the Soviet Red Army's will and capability were low, a line of thinking shared by the Nazi hierarchy. A great deal has been made by historians over this fact, but some of the German General Staff's optimism was the result of estimates provided by the Abwehr, whose assessments left the German General Staff believing that the Red Army only possessed 90 infantry divisions, 23 cavalry divisions, and a mere 28 mechanized brigades. By the time the reappraisal of the Red Army by German military intelligence occurred in mid-June 1941 (which was about 25 percent higher than previously reported), it was a foregone conclusion that Hitler's invasion of the Soviet Union was going to take place.

Late assessments from the Abwehr contributed to military overconfidence and their reporting mechanism said nothing of the massive mobilization capability of the Soviet Union, an oversight that arguably contributed to the German defeat since time-tables were so important for German success. Many of the maps produced for Operation Barbarossa by the Abwehr were woefully inaccurate and portrayed dirt tracks as main roads, hampering the pace of logistical operations. The German Army's failure to reach its objectives in short order proved pivotal; once winter came, improperly outfitted German forces suffered when supplies did not reach them. (Note: It is doubtful that more accurate reporting would have deterred Hitler since at one point during the planning phase of Operation Barbarossa, General Georg Thomas, then head of the Defence Economy and Armament Office of the OKW, was scolded and patronized when he warned of insufficient fuel reserves for the attack, and voiced complaints about logistics due to the different gauges between German and Russian railways. See Barnett (2003). Hitler's Generals, p. 115.) Overestimating their capabilities and trusting their assessments too much, as well as underestimating their enemies (especially the Soviets and the Americans), atop long-standing traditions of unconditional obedience, comprised a historically central weakness in the German system, according to historian Klaus P. Fischer.

On 8 September 1941, under the auspices of the Commissar Order (Kommissarbefehl), the OKW issued a decree concerning the ruthless ideological imperatives of the Nazi state against all semblance of Bolshevism, a provision that included executing Soviet commissars and prisoners of war. Admiral Canaris, the head of the OKW Ausland/Abwehr, immediately expressed concern about the military and political ramifications of this order. Killing soldiers and even non-combatants in contravention of the Geneva Convention was not something the Abwehr leadership—namely Canaris—supported.

=== North Africa and the Middle East ===
The Abwehr was active in North Africa leading up to and during the Western Desert Campaign of 1941–42. North Africa, like other cases, proved disastrous for the Abwehr. The greatest failure occurred as a result of deception operations conducted by the British. An Italian of Jewish ancestry was recruited in France sometime in 1940 by the Abwehr. Unknown to the Germans, this individual was an agent codenamed "Cheese" who was already working for the British SIS before the war began. In February 1941, the Abwehr sent Cheese to Egypt to report on any British military operations; instead of providing his German handlers with accurate information, he passed strategic deception materials and hundreds of MI5 doctored messages to Nazi intelligence by way of a fictitious sub-agent named 'Paul Nicosoff', helping to ensure the success of Operation Torch. Confirmation of this fact came when one of Hitler's most trusted military advisers, Chief of the OKW Operations Staff, General Alfred Jodl, later informed his Allied interrogators that the Allied landings in North Africa came as a total surprise to the German general staff. (Note: During the spring of 1941, the Abwehr dispatched a Palestine-born Jew named Ernst Paul Fackenheim (who had been in a concentration camp) back to his place of birth to apprise the Germans over British efforts to prevent General Erwin Rommel from seizing the Suez Canal. Instead of reporting information back to the Nazis, Fackenheim, who had been dropped by parachute into Palestine, promptly turned himself over to the Allies.)

The need for upwards of 500 more agents to supplement intelligence operations in North Africa prompted the Abwehr to get creative. Arab prisoners of war (POWs) languishing in French camps were offered a trip back to their homeland if they agreed to spy for the Germans in North Africa, as were Soviet POWs in the East. Other intelligence collection efforts included working closely with the Luftwaffe on aerial reconnaissance missions over North Africa. Previously, aerial reconnaissance was ordered by army intelligence officers of the Army Group HQ (part of the structure to which the Abwehr was assigned). Major Witilo von Griesheim was sent to Italian Libya in early 1941 to set up AST Tripoli (code name WIDO). He soon set up a network of agents and wireless stations gathering information in Libya and in the surrounding French territories. In mid-July 1941, Admiral Canaris ordered Luftwaffe Major Nikolaus Ritter of Abwehr I to form a unit to infiltrate Egypt through the desert to make contact with the Egyptian Army Chief of Staff, el Masri Pasha, but this effort repeatedly failed. Accompanying Ritter in Libya was the Hungarian desert explorer László Almásy with a mission to gather intelligence from British-held Egypt. After Ritter was injured and sent away, Almásy took over command and organized the 1942 Operation Salam, which succeeded in transporting two German agents across the Libyan Desert behind enemy lines to Egypt. In July 1942, Almásy and his agents were captured by British counterintelligence operatives. (Note: One of the men taken into British custody (recruited to assist in communicating information between Egypt and Berlin) was a young Egyptian signals intelligence officer named Anwar Sadat (later President of Egypt).)

Other operations in North Africa were occurring concomitantly with those of Almásy and Ritter. During late January 1942 for instance, the OKW authorized the creation of a special unit, Sonderkommando Dora, which was placed under the command of Abwehr officer, Oberstleutnant Walter Eichler (formerly a Panzer officer as well). The unit included geologists, cartographers, and mineralogists, who were sent into North Africa to study desert topography and assess the terrain for military use, but by November 1942—following the Axis retreat from El Alamein—Sonderkommando Dora along with the Brandenburgers operating in the area, were withdrawn from the Sahara altogether.

An Iranian national recruited in Hamburg by the Abwehr before the war was converted into a double agent by British and Russian intelligence officers (working together in one of the few joint intelligence efforts of the war), who code-named him "Kiss". From late 1944 until the end of the war, Kiss, who was based out of the intelligence center in Baghdad, provided false information on Soviet and British troop movements in Iraq and Iran to the Abwehr; as directed by his Allied controllers. On the Afghan border, the Abwehr sought to turn the Faqir of Ipi against British forces. They infiltrated the region using Manfred Oberdörffer, a physician, and Fred Hermann Brandt, an entomologist under the guise of a medical mission to research leprosy. The mission was a failure, with Oberdörffer being killed and Hermann was taken prisoner.

=== Questionable commitment and recruiting ===
Just how committed typical members of the Abwehr were to German victory is difficult to assess, but if its leadership tells a story, it is not one of conviction. For instance, during March 1942, when many Germans still had confidence in their Führer and their army, Canaris saw things differently and told General Friedrich Fromm that there was no way Germany could win the war. (Note: Diary of the Chief of Staff, Befehlhabers des Ersatzheeres, 20 March 1942, Imperial War Museum, MI 14/981/3.)

Canaris had made the United States a primary target even before it entered into the conflict. By 1942, German agents were operating from within all of America's top armaments manufacturers. The Abwehr also suffered a very public debacle in Operation Pastorius, which resulted in the executions of six Abwehr agents sent to the United States to sabotage the American aluminum industry. The Abwehr attempted use of coercion as a means to infiltrate the United States when they 'recruited' a naturalized American citizen visiting Germany, William G. Sebold, by Gestapo threats and blackmail, code-naming him TRAMP, and assigning him the task of "serving as radio and microfilm channel for Major Nikolaus Ritter, head of the Abwehr Hamburg post's air intelligence section". Unfortunately for the Germans, who used Sebold successfully for a short period, he was discovered, and became a counterspy, and his communications to Germany were screened by the FBI. For more than a year and a half, the FBI was able to transmit misleading information via Sebold to German intelligence from a shortwave radio transmitter located on Long Island, NY. Meetings between Sebold and "bona fide German spies" were even filmed by FBI technicians. Not every spy the Abwehr sent was captured or converted in this manner, but the Americans, and especially the British, proved mostly successful in countering the efforts of the German Abwehr officers and used them to their advantage.

The Abwehr was impaired by agents who aided the Allies in whatever covert means were necessary. Canaris personally gave false information that discouraged Hitler from invading Switzerland (Operation Tannenbaum). He also persuaded Francisco Franco not to allow German forces to pass through Spain to invade Gibraltar (Operation Felix), but it may have been just as much the imposition of the SD. The SD was allegedly spreading rumors about the partition of Spain. SD operatives also established a station at the central post office in Madrid to police mail going through Spain and even attempted to assassinate one of Franco's pro-Allied generals, which strengthened Franco's intransigence against Hitler and the Nazi regime.

==== Agent Garbo ====
Operation Garbo, also known as "Garbo" or "Agent Garbo", was a crucial British intelligence operation during World War II aimed at deceiving the Abwehr. The mastermind behind this operation was Juan Pujol García, a Spanish double agent who worked for the British (Note: Garbo's case manager at MI5 was Tomás Harris) and whose acting was considered so good they codenamed him "Garbo". Garbo was highly successful in spreading disinformation to the Abwehr, primarily by creating a network of fictitious sub-agents and feeding them fabricated intelligence reports. These reports were carefully crafted to mislead the Germans about Allied intentions and strategies. Garbo's information was so convincing that he gained the confidence of the German high command, who considered him one of their most trustworthy sources.

One of the most significant achievements of Operation Garbo was its role in the success of the D-Day landings on June 6, 1944, as it contributed to the confusion and misdirection of German forces. By providing false information about an impending Allied invasion via the Pas de Calais, Garbo diverted German attention away from Normandy, where the actual landings took place, making Juan Pujol García's efforts in Operation Garbo instrumental in the overall Allied strategy and intelligence operations during World War II. Juan Pujol García was so trusted by both sides that he was awarded the MBE by the British and an Iron Cross by the Nazis.

=== Repression and complicity ===
Images of the Abwehr as a veritable organ of resistance inside the heart of Nazi Germany are not an accurate reflection across the spectrum of its entire operations or its personnel. In a staff of some 13,000, perhaps 50 were fundamentally anti-Nazi. (Note: Balfour's numbers do not match the figures put forth by historian Richard Breitman, who claims the organization consisted of "more than twenty-one thousand officials in 1941, not including informants and other sources." Nonetheless, the point remains the same, as the Abwehr was not largely populated by personnel working against the Nazi regime.) Before the invasion of Poland for instance, the Abwehr and SiPo jointly drew up a list of over 60,000 names, people who were to be the targets of Operation Tannenberg, an effort designed to systematically identify and liquidate the Polish elite. For several months before the invasion of the Soviet Union, the Abwehr was key in deception operations set up to convince the British and the Soviets that Great Britain was under threat of imminent invasion, an undertaking which helped soften the eastern territories for Operation Barbarossa. Before the commencement of the attack on the Soviet Union, the Abwehr also spread rumors that the British talk of an impending German attack was nothing more than disinformation.

During January 1942, partisan fighters at the port city of Eupatoria in Crimea assisted a Red Army landing there and revolted against the German occupying forces. Reinforcements were sent in under General Erich von Manstein and the port city was retaken. Reprisals against the partisans were carried out under the direction of Major Hans-Wolf Riesen, an Abwehr officer on the Eleventh Army's staff, who oversaw the execution of 1200 civilians, the bulk of whom were Jews. Additional evidence over the duties assigned to operatives in theater is revealing. Out in the field, the army group commander of the G-2 was assisted by the army group Abwehr officer (Frontaufklaerungskommando III), with additional help coming available from the secret field police. Abwehr officers in this capacity were tasked with overseeing personnel in counterintelligence, the safeguarding of classified information, and preventive security. The Frontaufklaerungskommando III received instructions concerning the Abwehr from OKH/General z.b.V./Gruppe Abwehr, and "informed army group G-2 of all Abwehr matters in a monthly report or special reports." Security within army headquarters was another area of responsibility so detachments of the secret field police were placed at his disposal and he cooperated with particular departments of the SD, the SS, and the police to be well versed in all fields of counterintelligence and kept tabs on guards, checking their reliability against available personnel records. According to the United States War Dept. General Staff,

The Abwehr officer maintained close liaison with Frontaufklaerungskommando III to be well informed about counterintelligence conditions, especially as far as the non-German population was concerned. The net of agents produced a clear picture of the morale and attitude of the population within the sector of the army group and reported on all activities of the enemy intelligence service, on resistance movements and other illegal groups, and guerrilla conditions.

According to Bauer, the Abwehr was more interested in perpetuating its interests than it was in saving Jews. While there are accounts of the Abwehr assisting Jews to safety via clandestinely arranged emigration, there are also cases of Abwehr operatives enriching themselves in the process through bribes and other monetary payoffs. (Note: For more on the depths of corruption in Nazi Germany, see: Frank Bajohr, Parvenüs und Profiteure: Korruption in der NS-Zeit. Frankfurt: Fischer Verlag, 2001.) Not only that, the Abwehr had its share of dedicated Nazis. For example, it is now known that Abwehr agent Hermann Giskes and Joseph Schreieder of the Gestapo cooperated in an operation known as Englandspiel, through which the Nazis gained "complete control" over all Dutch SOE agents between March 1942 and December 1943, whom they used as part of a successful deception scheme. (Note: For further details regarding Englandspiel, see Kochanski, Resistance: The Underground War Against Hitler, 1939–1945, pp. 373–380.)

=== CASSIA spy ring (Maier–Messner group) ===
A major Abwehr failure occurred when the existence of a resistance group and spy ring, which operated out of Austria and had been working with the Allies, was uncovered by the Gestapo; a failing for which the Abwehr was embarrassed. This resistance group provided the OSS with plans and information on Peenemünde, the V-1, V-2 rockets, Tiger tanks, aircraft (Messerschmitt Bf 109, Messerschmitt Me 163 Komet, etc.), and supplied information on the existence of major concentration camps like Auschwitz. Despite the Gestapo's use of torture, they were unable to uncover the true extent of the group's success, particularly in providing information for Operation Crossbow and Operation Hydra, both preliminary missions for Operation Overlord. Some 20 members of the group—including its key figures, Franz Joseph Messner (codenamed CASSIA by the OSS) and the priest Heinrich Maier—were eventually executed due to the intelligence failures of the OSS, who hired Bedřich Laufer (OSS Code name: Iris), a double agent who had also been working for the SD.

=== Undermining the regime ===
Several examples demonstrate that some Abwehr members were opposed to the Nazi regime. In January 1944 for example, American statesman Allen Dulles revealed his knowledge of a coalescing resistance against the Nazis, an assemblage of intellectuals from military and government circles; his main contact was Abwehr officer Hans Bernd Gisevius, who was stationed in Zurich as the German Vice Consul. Dulles communicated with the Abwehr concerning their intrigue against Hitler and even attempted discussions about a separate peace, but President Franklin D. Roosevelt would have none of it, preferring instead a policy of unconditional surrender for the Nazi government. Machinations against the National Socialists by the Abwehr were considerable in terms of the chain of command. General Hans Oster of the Abwehr remained in regular contact with Dulles. Foreknowledge and penetration of the Abwehr was such that Dulles reported later in February 1944 that the Abwehr was going to be absorbed by the SD. (Note: Dulles was not the only one receiving reports from resistance groups. Efforts by dissident Germans to contact the Allies in Switzerland and elsewhere during 1944 are also documented in U.S. Department of State, Foreign Relations of the United States (FRUS), 1944, vol. 1, General (Washington, DC, 1966), pp. 484–579.)

The SS continually undermined the Abwehr by putting its officers under investigation, believing them to be involved in anti-Hitler plots. Heydrich ensured that the Abwehr and Canaris were closely monitored. The SS also accused Canaris of being defeatist in his intelligence assessments, especially on the Russian campaign, and the Abwehr was under investigation for treason related to the earlier attack on Belgrade.

=== Eastern Front ===
Following the launch of Operation Barbarossa, an NKVD Soviet agent named Alexander Demyanov penetrated the Abwehr in late 1941 by posing as a member of a pro-German underground resistance with alleged access to the Soviet military leadership—this was a complete fabrication concocted by the GRU and NKVD, who used Demyanov as a double agent. During the autumn of 1942, Demyanov informed his German handlers that he was working as a communications officer at the Soviet headquarters in Moscow, which would give him access to important intelligence, a ruse that managed to fool the German intelligence commander on the Russian front at the time, Reinhard Gehlen of the Fremde Heere Ost (Foreign Armies East) intelligence section. Demyanov manipulated the military operations around Stalingrad, convincing Gehlen that Army Group Center would be unable to move west of Moscow to aide General Friedrich Paulus and the Sixth Army, which was ultimately encircled by the Red Army.

Likewise, a group of White Russians under General Anton Turkul sought asylum in Germany and offered to provide radio intelligence for the Germans and worked with the Abwehr in getting the necessary communication links established. One of the primary radio links was code-named MAX, supposedly located near the Kremlin. MAX was not the intelligence mechanism the Abwehr believed it to be, instead, it was "a creature of the NKGB", through which information was regularly disseminated concerning Foreign Armies East and Foreign Air Forces East and troop movements. Careful message trafficking and deception operations by the Soviets allowed them to misdirect the Germans and aided in the strategic surprise they enjoyed against Army Group Center in June 1944. Even though the Abwehr no longer existed at this point, the heritage operations connected to MAX gave the Soviet armies an advantage they would not have otherwise possessed and further proved the extent of damage attributable to the Abwehr's incompetence, as Moscow's disinformation repeatedly fooled the German high command.

== End of the Abwehr ==
On 10 September 1943, the incident which eventually resulted in the dissolution of the Abwehr occurred and came to be known as the "Frau Solf Tea Party". Hanna Solf was the widow of Wilhelm Solf, a former Colonial Minister under Kaiser Wilhelm II and ex-ambassador to Japan. Frau Solf had long been an anti-Nazi in Berlin. Members of her group were known as members of the "Solf Circle". At a tea party hosted by her on 10 September, a new member was included in the circle, a handsome young Swiss doctor named Paul Reckzeh. Reckzeh was an agent of the Gestapo (Secret State Police), to which he reported on the meeting, providing several incriminating documents. The members of the Solf Circle were arrested on 12 January 1944. Everyone involved in the Solf Circle—except Frau Solf and her daughter Lagi Gräfin von Ballestrem—was executed.

One of those executed was Otto Kiep, an official in the Foreign Office, who had friends in the Abwehr, among whom were Erich Vermehren and his wife, the former Countess Elizabeth von Plettenberg, who were stationed as agents in Istanbul. Both were summoned to Berlin by the Gestapo in connection with the Kiep case. Fearing for their lives, they contacted the British and defected.

Hitler had long suspected that Abwehr had been infiltrated by anti-Nazi defectors and Allied agents, and the defection of Vemehren after the Solf Circle arrests all but confirmed it. It was also mistakenly believed in Berlin that the Vermehrens absconded with the codes of the Abwehr and turned them over to the British. That proved to be the last straw for Hitler. Despite the efforts of the Abwehr to shift the blame to the SS or even to the Foreign Ministry, Hitler had had enough of Canaris and he told Himmler so, twice. He summoned the chief of the Abwehr for a final interview and accused him of allowing the Abwehr to "fall to bits". Canaris quietly agreed that it was "not surprising", as Germany was losing the war.

Hitler fired Canaris on the spot, and on 18 February 1944, Hitler signed a decree that abolished the Abwehr. (Note: For a long time, Hitler had found the Abwehr suspect in terms of performance; they had not apprised the German military with any intelligence on the North African landings nor much thereafter, leading Hitler to conclude that the Abwehr and its leadership were incompetent.) Its functions were taken over by the Reich Security Main Office (RSHA) and the senior RSHA official Walter Schellenberg replaced Canaris within the RSHA. This action strengthened Himmler's control over the military.

Canaris was cashiered and given the empty title of Chief of the Office of Commercial and Economic Warfare. He was arrested on 23 July 1944, in the aftermath of the "20 July Plot" against Hitler, and executed shortly before the end of the war, along with Oster, his deputy. The functions of Abwehr were then fully absorbed by Amt VI, SD-Ausland, a sub-office of the RSHA, which was part of the SS.

=== The Zossen documents ===
During the war, the Abwehr assembled a secret dossier detailing many of the crimes committed in Eastern Europe by the Nazis, known as the Zossen documents. These files were gathered together eventually to expose the regime's crimes. The documents were kept in a safe at the Zossen military headquarters not far from Berlin and remained under Abwehr control. Some of the papers were allegedly buried but the individual responsible for this, Werner Schrader, ended up implicated in the 20 July plot against Hitler and committed suicide shortly thereafter. Later, the documents were discovered by the Gestapo, and under the supervision of the SD Chief Ernst Kaltenbrunner, they were taken to Schloss Mittersill in the Tyrol and burned. Supposedly amongst the Zossen documents was the diary of Admiral Canaris, as well as the Vatican and Fritsch papers.

== Effectiveness and legacy ==
Many historians agree that, in general, the Abwehr had a poor reputation for the quality of its work and its unusually decentralized organization. Some of the Abwehr's less than stellar image and performance was due to the intense rivalry it had with the SS, the RSHA and with the SD. Other factors in the failings of the Abwehr may have included Allied success in deciphering the German Enigma machine ciphers through the code-breakers at Bletchley Park. During the August and September 1942 engagements in North Africa against Rommel, this Allied capability was a crucial element to Montgomery's success, as British signals intelligence (SIGINT) was superior to that of the Germans.

American historian Robin Winks says that the Abwehr was "an abysmal failure, failing to forecast Torch, or Husky, or Overlord". English historian Hugh Trevor-Roper says it was "rotten with corruption, notoriously inefficient, [and] politically suspect". He adds that it was under the "negligent rule" of Admiral Canaris, who was "more interested in anti-Nazi intrigue than in his official duties". Historian Norman Davies agrees with this observation and avows that Canaris "was anything but a Nazi enthusiast". According to Trevor-Roper, for the first two years of World War II it was a "happy parasite" that was "borne along ... on the success of the German Army". When the tide turned against the Nazis and the Abwehr proved unable to produce the intelligence the Axis leadership demanded, the Nazi authorities merged the Abwehr into the SS in 1944. Numerous intelligence failures and general incompetence led to catastrophic disasters for the German military in both its eastern and western campaigns. (Note: One officer from the German General Staff during Operation Barbarossa described the Abwehr's intelligence contribution to the war effort as nothing more than Mist, which is German for "manure" or "dung". See: Thomas, David (1987). "Foreign Armies East and German Military Intelligence in Russia 1941–45". Journal of Contemporary History. 22 (2): 261–301. doi:10.1177/002200948702200204. JSTOR 260933. S2CID 161288059.) In his book, The Secret War: Spies, Ciphers, and Guerrillas, 1939–1945, historian Max Hastings claims that other than suborning Yugoslav officers ahead of their 1941 emergency mobilization, the Abwehr's espionage operations were "uniformly unsuccessful".

Such harsh criticism of the Abwehr aside, the organization achieved some notable successes earlier in its existence. Members of the Abwehr played an important role (along with the SD) in helping to lay the groundwork for the 1938 Anschluß with Austria with Germany, and during the German occupation of Czechoslovakia an Abwehr group aided in the seizure of a strategically important railway tunnel in Polish Silesia in the final week of August 1939. Historian Walter Goerlitz claimed in his 1952 work, History of the German General Staff, 1657–1945, that Canaris and the Abwehr formed the "real center of military opposition to the regime", a view which many others do not share. Former OSS Berlin station chief and later director of the Central Intelligence Agency, Allen Dulles, evaluated German intelligence officers from the Abwehr at the end of the war and concluded that only the upper echelons were active dissenters and part of the opposition movement. According to Dulles, the Abwehr participated in a lot more than just machinations against Hitler's régime and asserted that approximately 95 percent of the Abwehr actively worked "against the Allies" whereas only about 5 percent of them were anti-Nazi in disposition. Military historian John Wheeler-Bennett wrote that the Abwehr "failed conspicuously as a secret intelligence service", that it was "patently and incontestably inefficient" and adds that members of the Abwehr "displayed no great efficiency either as intelligence officers or as conspirators...". Whatever successes the Abwehr enjoyed before the start of the Second World War, there were virtually none once the war began and worse, the British successfully ran 19 double agents through the Abwehr which fed them false information, duping the German intelligence service to the very end. (Note: So thorough was the British penetration of German military intelligence, that not one single agent the Abwehr had in Great Britain was legitimate. Historian David Kahn asserts that the British accomplished "the greatest deception in the history of warfare since the Trojans dragged into their jubilant city a huge wooden horse left by the departing Greeks".) (Note: Attempts by the Abwehr to encourage anti-colonial rebellion against the British Empire in Ireland (through contacts with the IRA) and in India (making ties with members of the Indian National Army) also proved unsuccessful since the British effectively thwarted their efforts.) Soviet infiltration into the Abwehr and NKVD successes against Abwehr agents also reflect poorly on German military intelligence efforts. Historian Albert Seaton makes an important observation regarding the German Army's failures as a result of poor intelligence by asserting that all too often, decisions were made as a result of the opinion of Hitler and that he imposed his views on the military chain of command and therewith, the choice of actions taken during the war. Max Hastings makes similar claims about the general nature of totalitarian systems: in Nazi Germany, intelligence assessments required adjustment to fit within the constraints of what Hitler would accept. Nonetheless, the general historical reputation of the Abwehr remains unfavourable in the view of many historians.

== Chiefs ==
No.	Portrait	Chief of the Abwehr	Took office	Left office	Time in office	Defence branch	Ref.
1	Friedrich Gempp	Colonel; Friedrich Gempp (1873–1947)	1 January 1921	June 1927	6 years, 5 months	Reichsheer	–
2	Günther Schwantes [de]	Major; Günther Schwantes (1881–1942)	June 1927	February 1929	1 year, 8 months	Reichsheer	–
3	Ferdinand von Bredow	Lieutenant colonel Ferdinand von Bredow (1884–1934)	February 1929	2 June 1932	3 years, 4 months	Reichsheer	–
4	Conrad Patzig	Rear admiral Conrad Patzig (1888–1975)	6 June 1932	1 January 1935	2 years, 209 days	Kriegsmarine	–
5	Wilhelm Canaris	Admiral; Wilhelm Canaris (1887–1945)	1 January 1935	12 February 1944	9 years, 42 days	Kriegsmarine	–
6	Georg Hansen	Colonel; Georg Hansen (1904–1944)	13 February 1944	1 June 1944	109 days	German Army	–
7	Walter Schellenberg	SS-Brigadeführer; Walter Schellenberg (1910–1952)	1 June 1944	4 May 1945	337 days	Schutzstaffel	–
8	Otto Skorzeny	SS-Obersturmbannführer; Otto Skorzeny (1908–1975)	5 May 1945	8 May 1945	3 days	Schutzstaffel	–

== See also ==
- 20 July plot
- B-Dienst: (Observation Service)—The Navy High Command OKM/Chi cipher bureau.
- Bergbauernhilfe
- Dietrich Bonhoeffer
- Eddie Chapman, a prominent British double agent who infiltrated the Abwehr and fed intelligence to MI5 during World War II. He was trusted by the Germans and awarded the Iron Cross.
- General der Nachrichtenaufklärung: The high command of the German Army (Wehrmacht) OKH/Chi cipher bureau.
- German Resistance
- Hermann Giskes—Leading light in the Abwehr Englandspiel operation in the Netherlands
- Irish Republican Army–Abwehr collaboration
- Luftnachrichten Abteilung 350: The OKL/Chi cipher bureau for high command of the Luftwaffe.
- OKW/Chi: The highest cryptologic bureau for the Wehrmacht supreme command
- Hans Oster, Canaris' deputy
- Operation Salaam, a long-range mission into British-held Egypt during World War II
- Oskar Schindler, another Abwehr agent

== Bibliography ==
- Andrew, Christopher (2018). The Secret World: A History of Intelligence. New Haven and London: Yale University Press. ISBN 978-0-30023-844-0.
- Archer, Christon; Ferris, John R.; Herwig, Holger H.; Travers, Timothy H.E. (2002). World History of Warfare. Lincoln: University of Nebraska Press. ISBN 978-0-80321-941-0.
- Barnett, Correlli, ed. Hitler’s Generals. New York: Grove Press, 2003. ISBN 978-0-8021-3994-8
- Balfour, Michael (1988). Withstanding Hitler. London: Routledge. ISBN 978-1-31500-183-8.
- Bassett, Richard (2011). Hitler's Spy Chief: The Wilhelm Canaris Betrayal. New York: Pegasus Books. ISBN 978-1-60598-450-6.
- Bauer, Yehuda (1996). Jews for Sale?: Nazi-Jewish Negotiations, 1933–1945. New Haven, CT: Yale University Press. ISBN 978-0-30006-852-8.
- Blandford, Edmund L. (2001). SS Intelligence: The Nazi Secret Service. Edison, NJ: Castle Books. ISBN 978-0-78581-398-9.
- Boeckl-Klamper, Elisabeth; Mang, Thomas; Neugebauer, Wolfgang (2018). Gestapo-Leitstelle Wien, 1938–1945 (in German). Wien: Edition Steinbauer. ISBN 978-3-90249-483-2.
- Breitman, Richard; Goda, Norman J.W.; Naftali, Timothy; Wolfe, Robert (2005). U.S. Intelligence and the Nazis. Cambridge and New York: Cambridge University Press. ISBN 978-0-52161-794-9.
- Brissaud, André. Canaris; the Biography of Admiral Canaris, Chief of German Military Intelligence in the Second World War. New York: Grosset & Dunlap, 1974. ISBN 978-0-44811-621-1
- Broucek, Peter (2008). Militärischer Widerstand: Studien zur österreichischen Staatsgesinnung und NS-Abwehr (in German). Wien: Böhlau. ISBN 978-3-20577-728-1.
- Brown, Anthony C. (1975). Bodyguard of Lies: The Extraordinary True Story Behind D-Day. New York: Harper and Row. ISBN 978-1-58574-692-7.
- Budiansky, Stephen. Battle of Wits: The Complete Story of Codebreaking in World War II. New York: The Free Press, 2000. ISBN 978-0-67088-492-6
- Burleigh, Michael (2010). Moral Combat: Good and Evil in World War II. New York: Harper Collins. ISBN 978-0-67001-832-1.
- Cooper, Matthew (1984). The German Army, 1933–1945. New York: Bonanza Books. ISBN 978-0-51743-610-3.
- Cruickshank, Charles Greig, and David Barlow. Deception in World War II. Oxford University Press, 1979. ISBN 978-0-19215-849-9
- Cubbage, T. L. "The German misapprehensions regarding overlord: Understanding failure in the estimative process." Intelligence and National Security (1987) 2#3 pp: 114–174.
- Davies, Norman (2008). No Simple Victory: World War II in Europe, 1939–1945. New York: Viking. ISBN 978-0-67001-832-1.
- Dear, Ian; Foot, M.R.D., eds. (1995). The Oxford Guide to World War II. Oxford; New York: Oxford University Press. ISBN 978-0-19-534096-9.
- Dulles, Allen (2000) [1947]. Germany's Underground: The Anti-Nazi Resistance. New York: Da Capo Press. ISBN 978-0-30680-928-6.
- Farago, Ladislas. The Game of the Foxes: The Untold Story of German Espionage in the United States and Great Britain During WWII, David McKay Co. Inc., 1971. ISBN 978-0-553-12342-5.
- Fischer, Klaus (1995). Nazi Germany: A New History. New York: Continuum. ISBN 978-0-82640-797-9.
- Gerwarth, Robert (2012). Hitler's Hangman: The Life of Heydrich. New Haven, CT: Yale University Press. ISBN 978-0-30018-772-4.
- Goerlitz, Walter (1985) [1953]. History of the German General Staff, 1657–1945. New York: Barnes & Noble. ISBN 978-1-56619-914-8.
- Hassell, Agostino von; MacRae, Sigrid; Ameskamp, Simone (2006). Alliance of Enemies. New York: Thomas Dunne Books. ISBN 978-0-31237-482-2.
- Hastings, Max (2016). The Secret War: Spies, Ciphers, and Guerrillas, 1939–1945. New York: Harper. ISBN 978-0-06225-927-1.
- Herfeldt, Olav. Schwarze Kapelle. Spionage und Widerstand. Die Geschichte der Widerstansgruppe um Admiral Wilhelm Canaris. Augsburg: Weltbild, 1990. ISBN 978-3-89350-077-2
- Hildebrand, Klaus (1973). The Foreign Policy of the Third Reich. Berkeley and Los Angeles: University of California Press. ISBN 978-0-520-02528-8.
- Höhne, Heinz (1979). Canaris: Hitler's Master Spy. New York: Doubleday. ISBN 978-0-385-08777-3.
- Holmes, Richard (2009). The Oxford Companion to Military History. Oxford; New York: Oxford University Press. ISBN 978-0-19866-209-9.
- Holt, Thaddeus (2004). The Deceivers: Allied Military Deception in the Second World War. New York: Scribner's. ISBN 9780743250429.
- Howard, Michael (1990). British Intelligence in the Second World War: Strategic Deception. Vol. 5. Cambridge University Press. ISBN 978-0-52140-145-6.
- Jacobsen, Hans-Adolf (1968). "The Kommissarbefehl and Mass Executions of Soviet Russian Prisoners of War". In Krausnick, Helmut; Buchheim, Hans; Broszat, Martin; Jacobsen, Hans-Adolf (eds.). Anatomy of the SS State. New York: Walker and Company. ISBN 978-0-00211-026-6.
- Kahn, David (1978). Hitler's Spies: German Military Intelligence in World War II. New York: Macmillan. ISBN 978-0-02560-610-4.
- Kitson, Simon. The Hunt for Nazi Spies: Fighting Espionage in Vichy France. Chicago: University of Chicago Press, 2008. ISBN 978-0-22643-893-1
- Kochanski, Halik (2022). Resistance: The Underground War Against Hitler, 1939–1945. New York: Liveright. ISBN 978-1-32409-165-3.
- Lemay, Benoit (2013). Erich von Manstein: Hitler's Master Strategist. Philadelphia; Oxford: Casemate. ISBN 978-1-61200-059-6.
- Lerner, K. Lee, and Brenda W. Lerner (2004). Encyclopedia of Espionage, Intelligence, and Security, vol. 1, A–E. New York: Thomson Gale. ISBN 0-7876-7686-1
- Leverkuehn, Paul (1954). German Military Intelligence. New York: Frederick A. Praeger Inc. ASIN B0000CIU8I.
- Liddell-Hart, B.H. The German Generals Talk. New York: Quill, 1979, [1948]. ISBN 0-688-06012-9
- Longerich, Peter (2012). Heinrich Himmler. Oxford and New York: Oxford University Press. ISBN 978-0199592326.
- McDonough, Frank (2005). Opposition and Resistance in Nazi Germany. Cambridge and New York: Cambridge University Press. ISBN 978-0-52100-358-2.
- Megargee, Geoffrey (2000). Inside Hitler's High Command. Lawrence, KS: University Press of Kansas. ISBN 978-0-70061-015-0.
- Molinari, Andrea (2013). Desert Raiders: Axis and Allied Special Forces, 1940–43. London: Osprey Publishing. ISBN 978-1-47280-215-6.
- Newsome, Bruce (2014). "Oberkommando der Wehrmacht (OKW) (1938–1945)". In David T. Zabecki (ed.). Germany at War: 400 Years of Military History. Vol. III, N–T. Santa Barbara, CA: ABC-CLIO. ISBN 978-1-59884-980-6.
- O.N.I. Review [Office of Naval Intelligence]. “German Espionage and Sabotage against the United States.” 1, no.3 (Jan. 1946): 33–38. [Declassified]. Full text online and retrievable from: https://web.archive.org/web/20011205033331/http://www.history.navy.mil/faqs/faq114-1.htm (Accessed December 20, 2014).
- Paine, Lauran (1984). German Military Intelligence in World War II: The Abwehr. Stein & Day. ISBN 978-0-7091-9628-0.
- Peterson, Neal H. (2002) [1992]. "From Hitler's Doorstep: Allen Dulles and the Penetration of Germany". In George C. Chalou (ed.). The Secrets War: The Office of Strategic Services in World War II. Washington DC: National Archives and Records Administration. ISBN 978-0-911333-91-6.
- Rankin, Nicholas (2008). A Genius for Deception: How Cunning Helped the British Win Two World Wars. Oxford; New York: Oxford University Press. ISBN 978-0-19975-671-1.
- Reginbogin, Herbert R. (2009). Faces of Neutrality: A Comparative Analysis of the Neutrality of Switzerland and other Neutral Nations during WW II. Berlin: LIT Verlag. ISBN 978-3-82581-914-9.
- Reitlinger, Gerald (1989). The SS: Alibi of a Nation, 1922–1945. New York: Da Capo Press. ISBN 978-0-30680-351-2.
- Reynolds, Nicholas (2022). Need to Know: World War II and the Rise of American Intelligence. New York and Boston: Mariner Books. ISBN 978-0-06296-747-3.
- Rich, Norman (1973). Hitler's War Aims Ideology: The Nazi State and the Course of Expansion. New York: W.W. Norton. ISBN 978-0-23396-476-8.
- Richelson, Jeffrey T. (1995). Century of Spies: Intelligence in the Twentieth Century. New York: Oxford University Press. ISBN 978-0-19507-391-1.
- Roseman, Mark (2000). A Past in Hiding: Memory and Survival in Nazi Germany. New York: Metropolitan Books. ISBN 978-0-80506-326-4.
- Schellenberg, Walter (2000) [1956]. The Labyrinth: Memoirs of Walter Schellenberg, Hitler's Chief of Counterintelligence. Translated by Louis Hagen. New York: Da Capo Press. ISBN 978-0306809279.
- Schoonover, Thomas. Hitler's Man in Havana: Heinz Luning and Nazi Espionage in Latin America. Lexington: University Press of Kentucky, 2008. ISBN 978-0-81312-501-5
- Seaton, Albert (1982). The German Army, 1933–1945. New York: Meridian. ISBN 978-0-452-00739-0.
- Shirer, William (1990). The Rise and Fall of the Third Reich. New York: MJF Books. ISBN 978-1-56731-163-1.
- Stephan, Robert W. (2004). Stalin's Secret War: Soviet Counterintelligence Against the Nazis, 1941–1945. Lawrence, KS: University Press of Kansas. ISBN 978-0-70061-279-6.
- Stewart, Jules (2014). The Kaiser's Mission to Kabul: A Secret Expedition to Afghanistan in World War I. I.B. Tauris. ISBN 978-1-78076-875-5.
- Taylor, James; Shaw, Warren (1997). The Penguin Dictionary of the Third Reich. New York: Penguin Reference. ISBN 978-0-14051-389-9.
- Taylor, Telford (1995) [1952]. Sword and Swastika: Generals and Nazis in the Third Reich. New York: Barnes & Noble. ISBN 978-1-56619-746-5.
- Thomas, David (1987). "Foreign Armies East and German Military Intelligence in Russia 1941-45". Journal of Contemporary History. 22 (2): 261–301. doi:10.1177/002200948702200204. JSTOR 260933. S2CID 161288059.
- Thurner, Christoph (2017). The CASSIA Spy Ring in World War II Austria: A History of the OSS's Maier-Messner Group. Jefferson, NC: McFarland Publishing. ISBN 978-1-47666-969-4.
- Tooze, Adam (2006). The Wages of Destruction: The Making and Breaking of the Nazi Economy. New York: Viking. ISBN 978-0-67003-826-8.
- Trevor-Roper (1992). The Last Days of Hitler. Chicago: University of Chicago Press. ISBN 978-0-226-81224-3.
- United States War Dept. General Staff (1984). German Military Intelligence, 1939-1945. Frederick, MD: University Publications of America. ISBN 978-0-89093-543-9.
- Waller, John (1996). The Unseen War in Europe: Espionage and Conspiracy in the Second World War. New York: Random House. ISBN 978-0-67944-826-6.
- Walton, Calder (2013). Empire of Secrets: British Intelligence, the Cold War, and the Twilight of Empire. New York: Overlook Press. ISBN 978-1-46830-946-1.
- Weinberg, Gerhard (1994). A World at Arms: A Global History of World War II. Cambridge and New York: Cambridge University Press. ISBN 978-0-521-44317-3.
- Weinberg, Gerhard (1996). Germany, Hitler, and World War II: Essays in Modern German and World History. Cambridge and New York: Cambridge University Press. ISBN 978-0-521-47407-8.
- Weinberg, Gerhard (2005). Hitler's Foreign Policy 1933–1939: The Road to World War II. New York: Enigma Books. ISBN 978-1-92963-191-9.
- Wheeler-Bennett, John W. (1980) [1954]. Nemesis of Power: The German Army in Politics 1918–1945. Basingstoke: Palgrave Macmillan. ISBN 978-0-333-06864-9.
- Winks, Robin W. (1996). Cloak & Gown: Scholars in the Secret War, 1939–1961. New Haven and London: Yale University Press. ISBN 978-0-30006-524-4.
- Zentner, Christian; Bedürftig, Friedemann (1991). The Encyclopedia of the Third Reich. New York: MacMillan Publishing. ISBN 978-0-02-897500-9.

== External links and further reading ==
- German Espionage and Sabotage Against the USA in WW2 at ibiblio.org. Includes details on the structure of Abwehr.
- Gross, Kuno, Michael Rolke & András Zboray, Operation SALAM – László Almásy's most daring Mission in the Desert War, Belleville, München, 2013
- Waller, John H. "The Double Life of Admiral Canaris." International Journal of Intelligence and CounterIntelligence 9, no.3 (1996): 271–289. The Double Life of Admiral Canaris
