= Francisco Miralles =

Francisco Miralles may refer to:

- Francesc Miralles i Galaup, Spanish painter
- Francisco Miralles (writer), Chilean engineer, painter and writer
- Francisco Miralles Arnau, dancer, choreographer and Spanish and classical dance teacher
- Francesc Miralles, Catalan writer, essayist, translator, and musician
