= Eupithecia fredi =

Scientific classification
- Kingdom: Animalia
- Phylum: Arthropoda
- Clade: Pancrustacea
- Class: Insecta
- Order: Lepidoptera
- Family: Geometridae
- Genus: Eupithecia
- Species: E. fredi

Binomial name
- Eupithecia fredi Mironov & Ratzel, 2012

Species of moth

Eupithecia fredi is a moth in the family Geometridae. It is found in eastern Afghanistan. It is named for German lepidopterologist Fred Hermann Brandt who collected the holotype.

The wingspan is 18–22.5 mm (0.71–0.89 in).
