= Abteilung III b =

Military intelligence service of the Prussian/German Army (1889–1918)

Abteilung III b was the domestic counterintelligence branch of the Imperial German Army (Deutsches Heer) from 1889 until the end of the First World War. Initially created as a section in the Prussian General Staff in 1889 and named Sektion III b, it was upgraded to a department and renamed Abteilung III b in June 1915.

== History ==
The initial responsibilities of Sektion III b consisted of counterintelligence and foreign espionage. Its counter-espionage efforts focused on the French Third Republic and the Russian Empire while the Imperial German Navy (Kaiserliche Marine) was responsible for military intelligence in the United Kingdom (UK). During the First World War, III b acquired additional roles in media censorship and propaganda.

In 1917 Abteilung III b gained authorization to operate domestic counterintelligence (German: Inlandsaufklärung). The secret activities of III b developed under the head of Abteilung III b, Colonel Walter Nicolai (in office: 1913–1918), as war made the need for counter-espionage more pressing. Never before had a German intelligence group held such influence in the German Reich.

When the war began, the network of agents in enemy countries quickly evaporated as belligerent nations arrested the agents. The Secret Service could not provide information about enemy intentions and operational-deployment plans. At the German General Staff, within the News Department, the 'enemy editor' grew more suspicious of information delivered as facts, as the intelligence service's reports often proved to be false. In the assessment of the enemy situation, there was one mishap after another. The fundamental error lay in the separation of news gathering and analysis.

As the war progressed, Abteilung III b increasingly established itself as a counterintelligence and ultra-nationalist propaganda organization. The Far-Left press often referred to Colonel Nicolai, the head of the Abteilung, as the "father of lies", among many other things.

In addition, Abteilung III b also expanded as the agents of the intelligence arm of the Imperial German Navy under diplomatic cover in the German Foreign Office were exposed in Mexico, Argentina, and the United States.

At the end of the war, the division was disbanded.

== Outline ==
During the First World War, the division was significantly upgraded and divided into press, propaganda, intelligence and defense:

Mobile Division III b (attached to the OHL)
Counterintelligence in operational territory
Counterintelligence in occupied territory
News service / press
Neutral military attaché quarters

Deputy Division III b (Berlin)
Counterintelligence in Germany
News service / press
Politics

War press office (Berlin)
Information centre
Censorship office
Foreign office
Domestic office

== Bibliography ==
- Altenhöner, Florian (Winter 2005). "Total War—Total Control? German Military Intelligence on the Home Front, 1914–1918". The Journal of Intelligence History. 5 (2): 55–72. doi:10.1080/16161262.2005.10555117. S2CID 153602438.
- Foley, Robert T. (Winter 2005). "Easy target or Invincible Enemy? German Intelligence Assessments of France Before the Great War". The Journal of Intelligence History. 5 (2): 1–24. doi:10.1080/16161262.2005.10555115. S2CID 155125666.
- Hieber, Hanne (Winter 2005). "'Mademoiselle Docteur': The Life and Service of Imperial Germany's Only Female Intelligence Officer". The Journal of Intelligence History. 5 (2): 91–108. doi:10.1080/16161262.2005.10555119. S2CID 141986010.
- Höhne, Heinz (1976). Canaris Patriot im Zwielicht [Canaris: Patriot in the Twilight] (in German). Munich: Bertelsmann. ISBN 3-570-01608-0. OCLC 230569943.
- Pöhlmann, Markus (Winter 2005). "German Intelligence at War, 1914–1918". The Journal of Intelligence History. 5 (2): 25–54. doi:10.1080/16161262.2005.10555116. S2CID 155389900.
- Schmidt, Jürgen W. (Winter 2005). "Against Russia: Department IIIb of the Deputy General Staff, Berlin, and Intelligence, Counterintelligence and Newspaper Research, 1914–1918". The Journal of Intelligence History. 5 (2). Translated by Anja Becker: 73–89. doi:10.1080/16161262.2005.10555118. S2CID 152339050.
- Schmidt, Jürgen W., ed. (2009). Geheimdienste, Militär und Politik in Deutschland [Intelligence Services, the Military and Politicians in Germany] (in German) (2nd ed.). Ludwigsfelder Verl.-Haus: Ludwigsfelde. ISBN 978-3-933022-55-4. OCLC 494691175.
- Schmidt, Jürgen W. (2009). Gegen Russland und Frankreich : Der deutsche militärische Geheimdienst, 1890–1914 [Against Russia and France: The German Military Intelligence 1890–1914] (3rd ed.). Ludwigsfelder Verl.-Haus: Ludwigsfelde. ISBN 978-3-933022-44-8. OCLC 800412308.
