= Manfred Oberdörffer =

German physician and intelligence agent (1910–1941)

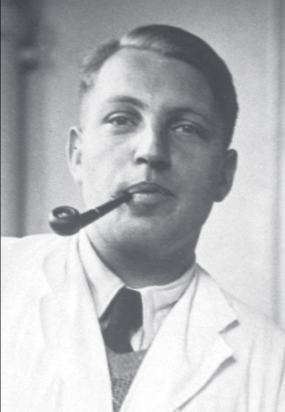
Oberdörffer in 1940 at the Kaiser-Wilhelm-Institut für Biochemie, Berlin

Manfred J. Oberdörffer (6 December 1910 – 19 July 1941) was a German physician and specialist on leprosy. He also served as an intelligence agent in the Nazi Abwehr and died on a mission into Afghanistan under the cover of leprosy research.

== Biography ==
Oberdörffer was born in Lübeck where he was born in an old Hamburg family. His father Ernst was a merchant who had managed a porcelain factory. He had served in World War I and died in 1925 when Manfred was just fifteen. His mother Elisabeth née Alfeis then fell ill with tuberculosis (and died in 1931) supported only by a war widow's pension. A paternal uncle, and godfather, Wilhelm Oberdörffer (1886–1965) was a school inspector and had been involved in the reconstruction of the Hamburg State Opera as a trustee. Oberdörffer managed to complete school but was forced to find odd jobs to meet ends. After completing secondary school at the age of nineteen, he went to study medicine at the Ludwig-Maximilians-Universität München and during this period became a friend of Hans von Lehndorff (1910–1987) who later wrote a biography about Oberdörffer. He also spent the winter semester 1932/33 at the University of Greifswald. He passed the examination in 1935. By 1933, Oberdörffer joined the NSDAP and gave his descent as "Aryan" although his great-grandparents included Jews (enough to fit the Nazi category of "Jew II Grade"). The Reich Office noted Cohens in his ancestry on the maternal side and denied recognition of his medical degree but a professor from Hamburg Hugo Schottmuller supported him.

=== Leprosy ===
In 1937, he went to England and passed an examination to join the British Empire Leprosy Relief Association. He then worked in Nigeria studying leprosy and a book with material from this period was published posthumously in 1941. Oberdörffer accepted the idea that leprosy was caused by bacteria but also came to the conclusion that it was not passed on from mothers to children and that it required certain body conditions for the infection to take hold. He also considered food and geography as factors. He claimed that certain plant saponins especially from Colocasia reduced body resistance to leprosy infection. He attended the 4th International Leprosy Congress at Cairo in 1938 and then travelled to India, Thailand, China and Kuala Lumpur. In 1939, he returned to Germany as his spleen had expanded due to a malaria infection. He discovered that his publications had made him famous in Germany, and he was able to convince Adolf Butenandt at the Kaiser Wilhelm Institute that diseases were important for the war effort. He conducted experiments on diet and cholesterol, with feeding experiments conducted on black French prisoners of war.

=== Afghanistan mission ===
In 1940, Oberdörffer was assigned to the Brandenburgers regiment. He was termed as a paramedic since he was non-Aryan for the Wehrmacht. After training, he was posted by Field Marshal Wilhelm Keitel to look for the Fakir of Ipi and to supply him with money and weapons so as to turn the Waziris against the British. Operation Tiger as it was called included Oberdörffer and Fred Brandt who could speak Russian, Persian and Arabic, and also collected butterfly specimens. The team included the two who were to act as leprosy doctor along with officer Dietrich Witzel and two radio operators. They reached Herat and Witzel gave them contacts in Kabul. The Italian consul Pietro Quaroni knew about the plan and may have leaked information. The Fakir of Ipi had held against the British for more than a decade. They went on foot and on July 19, 1941, they reached a river with Afghan troops nearby. A shootout began and in the firing Oberdörffer was hit in the stomach while Brandt was shot in the thigh. A second shot hit Oberdörffer in the chest. Brandt was captured and Oberdörffer died from his injuries. He is buried in the British cemetery in Kabul.
