= Tomás Harris =

MI5 officer and art dealer (1908–1964)

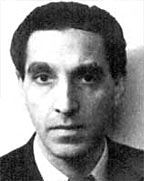
- Born: Tomás Joseph Harris; 10 April 1908; Hampstead, United Kingdom
- Died: 27 January 1964 (aged 55); Llucmajor, Mallorca, Spain
- Military career
- Allegiance: United Kingdom
- Branch: Security Service
- Operations: Fortitude

Tomás "Tommy" Joseph Harris (10 April 1908 – 27 January 1964) was a British art dealer and artist, who also served as an MI5 intelligence officer during World War II. As a Spanish-speaker, he worked with Juan Pujol García, a very important double agent in the Double Cross System.

Born of a Spanish mother, Enriqueta Rodriguez, and an English father, Lionel Harris, an art dealer specialising in Spanish paintings, he grew up in a Jewish household in Hampstead, his mother having converted to Judaism at the time of the marriage, Harris continued his father's successful art dealing business, and was essentially an amateur artist himself. Harris had an important collection of Spanish prints, especially those of Francisco Goya, which was mostly acquired by the British Museum after his death. In fact, Harris, while still alive, placed his collection on indefinite loan in the British Museum. The British Museum has 708 objects formerly in his collection, including 22 prints he made himself, and in 1981 published Goya's Prints, The Tomás Harris Collection in the British Museum, edited by Juliet Wilson Bareau.

He had five siblings, including Enriqueta Harris (1910–2006), an art historian specialising in Spanish art, and four others: William, Morris, Violeta, and Conchita.

== Possible double agent ==
In 1962, Flora Solomon – a friend of Kim Philby – told Victor Rothschild, who had worked with MI6 during World War II, that she thought that Philby and Tomás Harris had been Soviet spies, since the 1930s. "Those two were so close as to give me an intuitive feeling that Harris was more than a friend."

As a result of this information, MI5 sought to interview Harris. However, Harris was killed in a motor accident at Llucmajor, Mallorca, before an interview could occur. It has been suggested that Harris was murdered. For example, Chapman Pincher suggested that Harris was killed by Soviet agents to prevent him speaking to MI5:

The police could find nothing wrong with the car, which hit a tree, but Harris's wife, who survived the crash, could not explain why the vehicle had gone into a sudden slide. It is considered possible, albeit remotely, that the KGB might have wanted to silence Harris before he could talk to the British security authorities, as he was an expansive personality, when in the mood, and was outside British jurisdiction. The information, about which MI5 wanted to question him and would be approaching him in Majorca [a.k.a. Mallorca], could have leaked to the KGB from its source inside MI5.

Pincher pointed out that the most likely source of any leak was Roger Hollis, then director-general of MI5 who Pincher controversially claimed was a Soviet agent.

According to Bill Bristow, Tomas Harris's godson, his father, Desmond Bristow, was a very close friend of Tomas Harris and interviewed Juan Pujol (Garbo) before Tommy became Garbo's case officer. He reveals the fact that Tomas Harris funded Philby's book, which he never wrote. Bill Bristow believes Tommy would have known Philby was a KGB operative but was never involved himself, although it was possible.

In a letter dated 8 September 1981 to Dick Brewis, Brian Sewell wrote:

I had a very long and confidential conversation with an old friend and contemporary of Tomas H last night. It seems clear that TH was involved in espionage, but for the Americans and not the Russians: at his death MI5 managed to suppress information about work done specifically for Eisenhower details of which were known to one particular obit writer.

The "old friend" was probably Anthony Blunt.

== Harris and Pujol ==
Together they made up a fictional team of 27 fake sub-agents, who were created in order to convince German intelligence that Garbo was a reliable spy. This resulted in what became known as the Garbo deception.

=== Pujol's and Tomás' network of fictitious agents ===
Garbo/Arabel; Juan Pujol García
Agent 1 KLM steward resigned in 1943	Agent 2 William Gerbers; Swiss-German businessman died in Bootle in 1942	Agent 3 Benedict "Carlos"; Venezuelan student in Glasgow	Agent 4 Chamillus; Gibraltarian; NAAFI waiter based in Chislehurst	Agent 5 Moonbeam; Venezuelan based in Ottawa brother of "Benedict"	Agent 6 Field Security; NCO died in 1943	Agent 7 Dagobert; Ex-seaman in Swansea
KLM pilot and courier	WIDOW; Mrs. Gerbers (paid a pension by the Germans)	Pilot Officer	Almura radio operator	Cousin of "Moonbeam" and "Benedict", residing in Buffalo, New York	Soldier in British 9th Armoured Division
Head of Spanish; MOI Section	Officer in British 49th Infantry Division	Guard based in Chislehurst	Donny; Leader of World Aryan Order
Censor in MOI	Greek seaman and deserter	US NCO based in London	Wren in Ceylon
Secretary in Cabinet Office	Dick; Indian fanatic
Drake in Exeter
Welsh fascist in South Wales
Dorick in Harwich

== Bibliography ==
- Seaman, M. (2004). Garbo: The Spy Who Saved D-Day. Toronto: Dundurn Press. ISBN 9781550025040.
