= Friedrich Gempp =

German army officer (1873–1947)

1st Chief of the Abwehr
- In office January 1921 – June 1927
- Succeeded by: Günther Schwantes

Personal details
- Born: 6 July 1873 Freiburg im Breisgau, Grand Duchy of Baden, German Empire
- Died: 21 April 1947 (aged 73) Moscow, Soviet Union

Military service
- Allegiance: German Empire; Weimar Republic; Nazi Germany
- Branch/service: Imperial German Army; Reichswehr; Army
- Years of service: 1893–1927; 1939–1943
- Rank: Generalmajor
- Awards: Order of the Red Eagle; Knight's Cross of the House Order of Hohenzollern; Iron Cross 2nd and 1st class War Merit Cross

Friedrich Gempp (6 July 1873 – 21 April 1947) was a German career army officer, who served in the Imperial German Army, the Reichswehr and the army of the Wehrmacht. He is credited as the founder and first chief of the intelligence service (Abwehr) of the Reichswehr in the Weimar Republic. Recalled to active service just before the outbreak of World War II, he returned to intelligence work and was promoted to Generalmajor. He was arrested by Soviet authorities at the end of the war and died in captivity.

== Biography ==
=== Career in the Imperial Army and the Reichswehr ===
Gempp was born in 1873 at Freiburg im Breisgau and joined the Royal Prussian Army in 1893 as a one-year volunteer (Einjährig-Freiwilliger) in the 132nd (1st Lower Alsatian) Infantry Regiment. After obtaining an appointment to the officer corps, he served as a battalion adjutant. From 1903 to 1906, he attended the Prussian Military Academy. He then served in the General Staff and as company commander in the 171st (2nd Upper-Alsatian) Infantry Regiment. In 1913, he was assigned as an intelligence officer to the I Army Corps.

After the mobilization for World War I, Gempp had the same function in the general staff of the 8th Army and the Ober Ost (eastern front command). In 1915, he was promoted to Major, and later in 1917, he was appointed to the Oberste Heeresleitung (Supreme Army Command) under Oberst Walter Nicolai, where he remained until its termination in October 1919.

Gempp remained in the post-war Reichswehr, and in the spring of 1920, he was promoted to Oberstleutnant and assigned to the formation of a new military intelligence service. He served in its statistical office in the Ministry of the Reichswehr until his retirement with a brevet appointment to Generalmajor in June 1927.

=== The Gempp report and service in World War II ===
From 1928 to 1944, Gempp wrote a monumental report on Geheimer Nachrichtendienst und Spionageabwehr des Heeres, (Secret Intelligence Service and Counterintelligence of the Army in the First World War), the so-called Gempp report. With the mobilization in 1939 for the invasion of Poland, he was recalled to active service with Abwehr, the intelligence service of the Oberkommando der Wehrmacht (OKW – the armed forced high command). He worked in its Ausland (foreign) intelligence department, was formally promoted to Generalmajor in February 1941 and remained in this post until his retirement in May 1943. During the war, he was awarded the War Merit Cross, 1st and 2nd class. Gempp was assumed to have been captured by the Soviet Army in 1945 at the end of the war, and he officially was declared dead on 11 August 1946.

=== Arrest, death and rehabilitation ===
It was eventually determined that Gempp was arrested by SMERSH, the Soviet military intelligence service, on 10 April 1946, transferred to imprisonment in Moscow at Butyrka prison and died of heart failure in the prison hospital on 3 January 1947. On 10 September 2001, the Chief Military Prosecutor's Office of the Russian Federation declared the arrest to have been politically motivated, and he was "rehabilitated".

== Awards and decorations ==
- Order of the Red Eagle 4th class with crown
- Knight's Cross of the House Order of Hohenzollern with swords
- Iron Cross (1914) 2nd and 1st class
- Service Award Cross of Prussia
- Military Merit Order of Bavaria, 4th class with swords and crown
- Knight's Cross 1st class of the Albert Order with swords and crown
- Knight's Cross of the Order of the Württemberg Crown with swords
- Knight's Cross 1st class of the Order of the Zähringer Lion with swords
- Hanseatic Cross of Hamburg
- Military Merit Cross of Austria-Hungary, 3rd class
- Order of the Medjidie 3rd class
- Liakat Medal in silver with swords
- Gallipoli Star
- Commander's Cross of the Order of Military Merit of Bulgaria
- Honour Cross of the World War 1914/1918
- War Merit Cross 2nd and 1st class
