= Juan Pujol García =

Spanish double agent for the British in World War II (1912–1988)

Juan Pujol García MBE
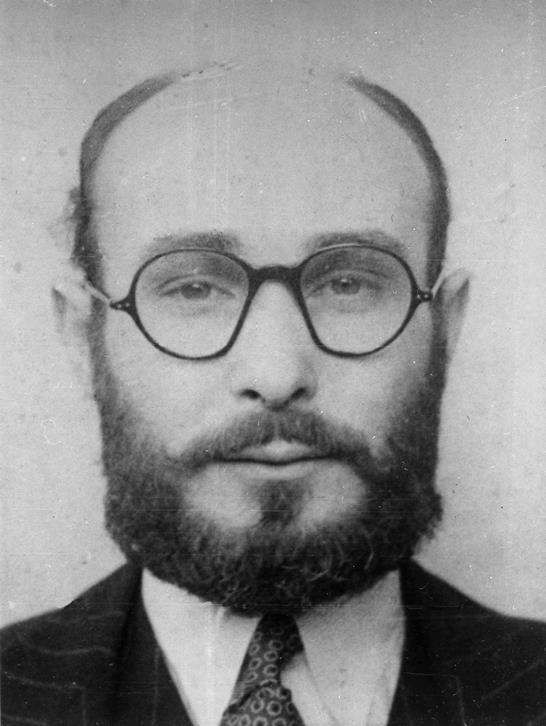
- Born: 14 February 1912; Barcelona, Spain
- Died: 10 October 1988 (aged 76); Caracas, Venezuela
- Spouses: Araceli González Carballo; Carmen Cilia Alvarez
- Awards: Member of the Most Excellent Order of the British Empire; Iron Cross, Second Class
- Espionage activity
- Allegiance: United Kingdom
- Service branch: Security Service (MI5)
- Service years: 1942–1944
- Codename: Garbo
- German codename: Alaric
- Operations: Operation Fortitude

Juan Pujol García (Spanish: [ˈxwan puˈʝol ɣaɾˈθi.a]; 14 February 1912 – 10 October 1988) was a Spanish spy who worked as a double agent loyal to the United Kingdom against Nazi Germany during World War II, when he relocated to Britain to carry out fictitious spying activities for the Germans. He was given the codename Garbo by the British; their German counterparts codenamed him Alaric and referred to his non-existent spy network as "Arabal".

After developing a loathing of totalitarianism during the Spanish Civil War, Pujol decided to become a spy for Britain as a way to do something "for the good of humanity". Pujol and his wife contacted the British Embassy in Madrid, which rejected his offer.

Undeterred, he created a false identity as a fanatically pro-Nazi Spanish government official and successfully became a German agent. He was instructed to travel to Britain and recruit additional agents; instead he moved to Lisbon and created bogus reports about Britain from a variety of public sources including a tourist guide to Britain, train timetables, cinema newsreels, and magazine advertisements.

Although the information would not have withstood close examination, Pujol soon established himself as a trustworthy agent. He began inventing fictitious sub-agents who could be blamed for false information and mistakes. The Allies finally accepted Pujol when the Germans expended considerable resources attempting to hunt down a fictitious convoy. Following interviews by Desmond Bristow of Section V MI6 Iberian Section, Pujol was taken on. The family were moved to Britain and Pujol was given the code name "Garbo". Pujol and his handler Tomás Harris spent the rest of the war expanding the fictitious network, communicating to the German handlers at first by letters and later by radio. Eventually the Germans were funding a network of 27 agents, all fictitious.

Pujol had a key role in the success of Operation Fortitude, the deception operation intended to mislead the Germans about the timing, location, and scale of the invasion of Normandy in 1944. The false information Pujol supplied helped persuade the Germans that the main attack would be in the Pas de Calais, so that they kept large forces, including the Fifteenth Army, lead by Hans von Salmuth, there before and even after the invasion. Pujol had the distinction of receiving military decorations from both sides of the war – being awarded the Iron Cross and later becoming a Member of the Order of the British Empire.

== Early life ==
Pujol was born in Barcelona to Joan Pujol, a Catalan who owned a cotton factory, and Mercedes García Guijarro, from the Andalusian town of Motril in the Province of Granada. The third of four children, Pujol was sent at age seven to the Valldemia boarding school run by the Marist Brothers in Mataró, twenty miles (32 km) from Barcelona; he remained there for the next four years. The students were only allowed out of the school on Sundays if they had a visitor, so his father made the trip every week.

His mother came from a strict Roman Catholic family and took Communion every day, but his father was much more secular and had liberal political beliefs. At age thirteen, he was transferred to a school in Barcelona run by his father's card-playing friend Monsignor Josep, where he remained for three years. After an argument with a teacher, he decided that he no longer wished to remain at the school, and became an apprentice at a hardware store.

Pujol engaged in a variety of occupations prior to and after the Spanish Civil War, such as studying animal husbandry at the Royal Poultry School in Arenys de Mar and managing various businesses, including a cinema.

His father died a few months after the Second Republic's establishment in 1931, while Pujol was completing his education as a poultry farmer. Pujol's father left his family well-provided for, until his father's factory was taken over by the workers in the early stages of the Spanish Civil War.

== Spanish Civil War ==
Pujol as a conscript, 1931

In 1931, Pujol did his six months of compulsory military service in a cavalry unit, the 7th Regiment of Light Artillery. He knew he was unsuited for a military career, hating horse-riding and claiming to lack the "essential qualities of loyalty, generosity, and honour". Pujol was managing a poultry farm north of Barcelona in 1936 when the Spanish Civil War began. His sister Elena's fiancé was taken by Republican forces. Later, she and his mother were arrested and charged with being counter-revolutionaries. A relative in a trade union was able to rescue them from captivity.

He was called up for military service on the Republican side (in opposition to Francisco Franco's Nationalists), but opposed the Republican government due to their treatment of his family. He hid at his girlfriend's home until he was captured in a police raid and imprisoned for a week before being freed via the Traditionalist resistance group Socorro Blanco. They hid him until they could produce fake identity papers that showed him to be too old for military service. He started managing a poultry farm that had been requisitioned by the local Republican government, but it was not economically viable. The experience with rule by committee intensified his antipathy towards communism.

He re-joined the Republican military using his false papers with the intention to desert as soon as possible, volunteering to lay telegraph cables near the front line. He managed to desert to the Nationalist side during the Battle of the Ebro in September 1938. However, he was equally ill-treated by the Nationalist side, disliking their fascist influences and being struck and imprisoned by his colonel upon Pujol's expressing sympathy with the monarchy.

His experience with both sides left him with a deep loathing of both fascism and communism, and by extension Nazi Germany and the Soviet Union. He was proud that he had managed to serve both sides without firing a single bullet for either. After his discharge from the Nationalist army, he met Araceli González in Burgos and married her in Madrid; they had one child, Joan Fernando.

== World War II ==
=== Independent spying ===
In 1940, during the early stages of World War II, Pujol decided that he must make a contribution "for the good of humanity" by helping Britain, which was at the time Germany's only adversary. Starting in January 1941, he approached the British Embassy in Madrid three different times, including through his wife (though Pujol edited her participation out of his memoirs), but they showed no interest in employing him as a spy. Therefore, he resolved to establish himself as a German agent before approaching the British again to offer his services as a double-agent.

Pujol created an identity as a fanatically pro-Nazi Spanish government official who could travel to London on official business; he also obtained a fake Spanish diplomatic passport by fooling a printer into thinking Pujol worked for the Spanish embassy in Lisbon. He contacted Friedrich Knappe-Ratey, an Abwehr agent in Madrid, codenamed "Frederico". The Abwehr accepted Pujol and gave him a crash course in espionage (including secret writing), a bottle of invisible ink, a codebook, and £600 for expenses. His instructions were to move to Britain and recruit a network of British agents.

He moved instead to Lisbon; using a tourist's guide to Britain, reference books and magazines from the Lisbon Public Library, and newsreel reports he saw in cinemas, he created seemingly credible reports that appeared to come from London. During his time in Portugal, he stayed in Estoril, at the Hotel Palácio. He claimed to be travelling around Britain and submitted his travel expenses based on fares listed in a British railway guide. Pujol's unfamiliarity with the non-decimal system of currency used in Britain at the time was a slight difficulty. At this time Great Britain's unit of currency, the pound sterling, was subdivided into 20 shillings, each having twelve pence. Pujol was unable to total his expenses in this complex system, so simply itemised them, and said that he would send the total later.

During this time he created an extensive network of fictitious sub-agents living in different parts of Britain. Because he had never actually visited the UK, he made several mistakes, such as claiming that his alleged contact in Glasgow "would do anything for a litre of wine", unaware of Scottish drinking habits or that the UK did not use the metric system. His reports were intercepted by the British Ultra communications interceptions programme, and seemed so credible that the British counter-intelligence service MI5 launched a full-scale spy hunt.

In February 1942, either he or his wife (accounts differ) approached the United States after it had entered the war, contacting US Navy Lieutenant Patrick Demorest in the naval attache's office in Lisbon, who recognised Pujol's potential. Demorest contacted his British counterparts.

=== Work with MI6 ===
The British had become aware that someone had been misinforming the Germans, and realised the value of this after the Kriegsmarine wasted resources attempting to hunt down a non-existent convoy reported to them by Pujol. He was moved to Britain on 24 April 1942 and given the code name "Bovril", after the drink concentrate. However, after he passed the security check conducted by MI6 Officer Desmond Bristow, Bristow suggested that he be accompanied by MI5 officer Tomás Harris (a fluent Spanish speaker) to brief Pujol on how he and Harris should work together. Pujol's wife and child were later moved to Britain.

Pujol operated as a double agent under the XX Committee's aegis. Cyril Mills was initially Pujol's case officer, but he spoke no Spanish and quickly dropped out of the picture. Mills suggested that Pujol's code name should be changed as befitted "the best actor in the world", and Pujol became "Garbo", after Greta Garbo. Mills passed his case over to the Spanish-speaking officer Harris. Together, Harris and Pujol wrote 315 letters, averaging 2,000 words, addressed to a post-office box in Lisbon supplied by the Germans. His fictitious spy network was so efficient and verbose that his German handlers were overwhelmed and made no further attempts to recruit any additional spies in the UK.

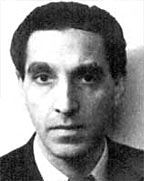
Pujol's case officer at MI5, Tomás Harris

The information supplied to German intelligence was a mixture of complete fiction, genuine information of little military value, and valuable military intelligence artificially delayed. In November 1942, just before the Operation Torch landings in North Africa, Garbo's agent on the River Clyde reported that a convoy of troopships and warships had left port, painted in Mediterranean camouflage. While the letter was sent by airmail and postmarked before the landings, it was deliberately delayed by British Intelligence in order to arrive too late to be useful. Pujol received a reply stating "we are sorry they arrived too late but your last reports were magnificent."

Pujol had been supposedly communicating with the Germans via a courier, a Royal Dutch Airlines (KLM) pilot willing to carry messages to and from Lisbon for cash. This meant that message deliveries were limited to the KLM flight schedule. In 1943, responding to German requests for speedier communication, Pujol and Harris created a fictitious radio operator. From August 1943 radio became the preferred method of communication.

On occasion, he had to invent reasons why his agents had failed to report easily available information that the Germans would eventually know about. For example, he reported that his (fabricated) Liverpool agent had fallen ill just before a major fleet movement from that port, and so was unable to report the event. To support this story, the agent eventually "died" and an obituary was placed in the local newspaper as further evidence to convince the Germans. The Germans were also persuaded to pay a pension to the agent's "widow".

For radio communication, "Alaric" needed the strongest hand encryption the Germans had. The Germans provided Garbo with this system, which was in turn supplied to the codebreakers at Bletchley Park. Garbo's encrypted messages were to be received in Madrid, manually decrypted, and re-encrypted with an Enigma machine for retransmission to Berlin. Having both the original text and the Enigma-encoded intercept of it, the codebreakers had the best possible source material for a chosen-plaintext attack on the Germans' Enigma key.

=== Operation Fortitude ===
In January 1944, the Germans told Pujol that they believed a large-scale invasion in Europe was imminent and asked to be kept informed. This invasion was Operation Overlord, and Pujol played a leading role in Operation Fortitude, the deception campaign to conceal Overlord. He sent over 500 radio messages between January 1944 and D-Day, at times more than twenty messages per day. During planning for the Normandy beach invasion, the Allies decided that it was vitally important that the German leaders be misled into believing that the landing would happen at the Strait of Dover.

In order to maintain his credibility, it was decided that Garbo (or one of his agents) should forewarn the Germans of the timing and some details of the actual invasion of Normandy, although sending it too late for them to take effective action. Special arrangements were made with the German radio operators to be listening to Garbo through the night of 5/6 June 1944 using the story that a sub-agent was about to arrive with important information. However, when the call was made at 3 AM, no reply was received from the German operators until 8 AM. This enabled Garbo to add more, genuine but now out-of-date, operational details to the message when finally received, and thus increase his standing with the Germans. Garbo told his German contacts that he was disgusted that his first message was missed, saying, "I cannot accept excuses or negligence. Were it not for my ideals I would abandon the work."

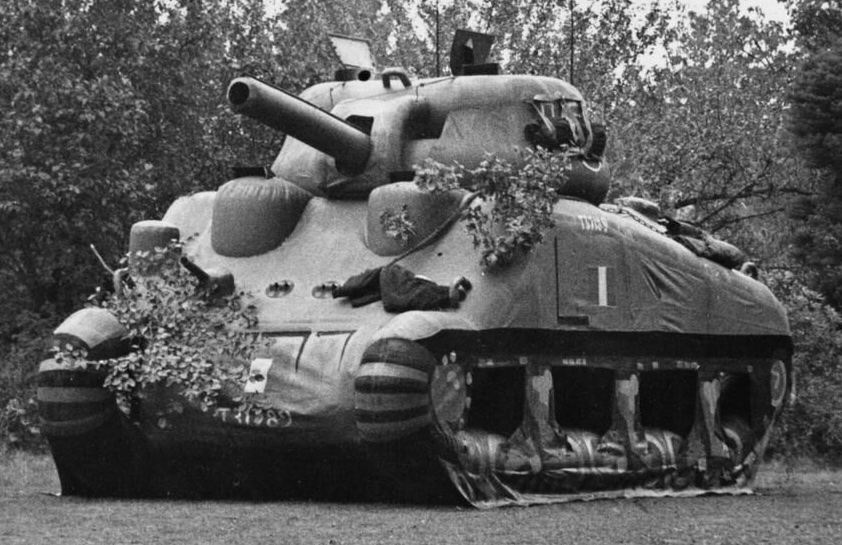
An inflatable M4 Sherman tank of the First US Army Group

On 9 June – three days after D-day – Garbo sent a message to German intelligence that was passed to Adolf Hitler and the Oberkommando der Wehrmacht (OKW; German High Command). Garbo said that he had conferred with his top agents and developed an order of battle showing 75 divisions in Britain; in reality, there were only about 50. Part of the "Fortitude" plan was to convince the Germans that a fictitious formation – First US Army Group, comprising 11 divisions (150,000 men), commanded by General George Patton – was stationed in southeast Britain.

The deception was supported by fake planes, inflatable tanks, and vans travelling about the area transmitting bogus radio chatter. Garbo's message pointed out that units from this formation had not participated in the invasion, and therefore the first landing should be considered a diversion. A German message to Madrid sent two days later said "all reports received in the last week from Arabel [spy network codename] undertaking have been confirmed without exception and are to be described as especially valuable." A post-war examination of German records found that, during Operation Fortitude, no fewer than sixty-two of Pujol's reports were included in OKW intelligence summaries.

OKW accepted Garbo's reports so completely that they kept two armoured divisions and 19 infantry divisions in the Pas de Calais waiting for a second invasion through July and August 1944. The German Commander-in-Chief in the west, Field Marshal Gerd von Rundstedt, refused to allow General Erwin Rommel to move these divisions to Normandy. There were more German troops in the Pas de Calais region at the end of June than there had been on D-Day.

In late June, Garbo was instructed by the Germans to report on the falling of V-1 flying bombs. Finding no way of giving false information without arousing suspicion, and being unwilling to give correct information, Harris arranged for Garbo to be "arrested". He returned to duty a few days later, now having a "need" to avoid London and forwarded an "official" letter of apology from the Home Secretary for his unlawful detention.

The Germans paid Pujol US$340,000 (equivalent to ~$6,330,000 in 2025) over the course of the war to support his network of agents.

== Honours ==
As Alaric, he was awarded the Iron Cross Second Class on 29 July 1944 for his services to the German war effort. The award was normally reserved for front-line fighting men and required Hitler's personal authorisation. The Iron Cross was presented via radio.

As Garbo, he received an MBE from King George VI, on 25 November 1944. The Nazis never realised they had been fooled, and thus Pujol – along with Eddie Chapman, another double agent – earned the distinction of being one of the few to receive decorations from both sides during World War II.

== After the war ==
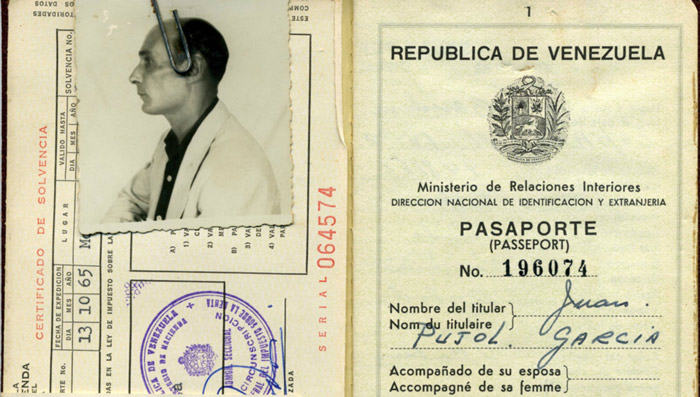
Pujol's passport in Venezuela

After the Second World War, Pujol feared reprisals from surviving Nazis. With the help of MI5, Pujol travelled to Portuguese Angola and faked his death from malaria in 1949. He then moved to Lagunillas, Venezuela, where he lived in relative anonymity running a bookstore and gift shop.

Pujol divorced his first wife and married Carmen Cilia, with whom he had two sons, Carlos Miguel and Joan Carlos, and a daughter who died in 1975 at the age of 20. By 1984, Pujol had moved to his son Carlos Miguel's house in La Trinidad, Caracas.

In 1971, the British politician Rupert Allason, writing under the pen name Nigel West, became interested in Garbo. For several years, he interviewed various former intelligence officers, but none knew Garbo's real name. Eventually, Tomás Harris' friend Anthony Blunt, the Soviet spy who had penetrated MI5, said that he had met Garbo, and knew him as "either Juan or José García". Allason's investigation was stalled from that point until March 1984, when a former MI5 officer who had served in Spain supplied Pujol's full name. Allason hired a research assistant to call every J. García – an extremely common name in Spain – in the Barcelona phone book, eventually contacting Pujol's nephew. Pujol and Allason finally met in New Orleans on 20 May 1984. They collaborated on his autobiography Operation Garbo, published in 1985.

At Allason's urging, Pujol travelled to London and was received by Prince Philip at Buckingham Palace, in an unusually long audience. After that he visited the Special Forces Club and was reunited with a group of his former colleagues, including T. A. Robertson, Roger Fleetwood-Hesketh, Cyril Mills, and Desmond Bristow. On the 40th anniversary of D-Day, 6 June 1984, Pujol travelled to Normandy to tour the beaches and pay his respects to the dead.

== Death ==
Pujol died of a stroke in Caracas in 1988, aged 74. He is buried in Choroní, a town inside Henri Pittier National Park by the Caribbean Sea.

== Network of fictitious agents ==
Each of Pujol's fictitious agents was tasked with recruiting additional sub-agents.

Garbo/Arabel; Juan Pujol García
Agent 1 KLM steward resigned in 1943	Agent 2 William Gerbers; Swiss-German businessman died in Bootle in 1942	Agent 3 Benedict "Carlos"; Venezuelan student in Glasgow	Agent 4 Chamillus; Gibraltarian; NAAFI waiter based in Chislehurst	Agent 5 Moonbeam; Venezuelan based in Ottawa brother of "Benedict"	Agent 6 Field Security; NCO died in 1943	Agent 7 Dagobert; Ex-seaman in Swansea
KLM pilot and courier	WIDOW; Mrs. Gerbers (paid a pension by the Germans)	Pilot Officer	Almura radio operator	Cousin of "Moonbeam" and "Benedict", residing in Buffalo	Soldier in British 9th Armoured Division
Head of Catalan; MOI Section	Officer in British 49th Infantry Division	Guard based in Chislehurst	Donny; Leader of World Aryan Order
Censor in MOI	Greek seaman and deserter	US NCO based in London	Wren in Ceylon
Drake in Exeter
Welsh fascist in South Wales
Dorick in Harwich

== Popular culture ==
=== Literature and music ===
- The Counterfeit Spy (1971), by the British journalist Sefton Delmer; Pujol's name was changed to "Jorge Antonio" in order to protect his surviving family.
- The Eldorado Network (1979), by the British novelist Derek Robinson, published six years before Nigel West's non-fiction account.
- Overlord, Underhand (2013), by the American author Robert P. Wells, a fictionalised retelling of the story of Juan Pujol (Agent Garbo), double agent with MI5, from the Spanish Civil War to 1944; ISBN 9781630680190
- Quicksand (1971), a song by David Bowie on the Hunky Dory album, makes reference to him ("I'm the twisted name on Garbo's eyes").

=== Film and television ===
- Garbo: The Spy (El Espía). Documentary film, directed by Edmon Roch. Production: Ikiru Films, Colose Producciones, Centuria Films, Spain 2009.
- The Man Who Fooled the Nazis. 90-minute Spanish documentary retitled and narrated in English, shown as part of the Storyville series, first shown on BBC Four, 22 February 2011.
- Secret D-Day – US television, 1998 – Garbo was portrayed by French actor Sam Spiegel.
- Garbo - Master of Deception. 1992 Columbia House and A&E 30-minute documentary.

Feature films telling Garbo's story have been attempted on several occasions, but none reached production.

=== Stage productions ===
- Garbo: The Actor Who Saved the World (El Actor que Salvó al Mundo) (2026) by Venezuelan playwright Gustavo Ott. Premiered at GALA Hispanic Theatre in Washington, DC, originally directed by Carlos Celdrán. Garbo originally portrayed by Kevin Jorges.

== See also ==
- Spain during World War II
- Totalitarianism
- Ben Macintyre

== Bibliography ==
- Haufler, H. (2014). The Spies Who Never Were. New York: Open Road. ISBN 9781497622623.
- Hesketh, R. (2002). Fortitude: The D-Day Deception Campaign. London: Penguin. ISBN 9781590209486.
- Holt, T. (2010). The Deceivers: Allied Military Deception in the Second World War. New York: Skyhorse. ISBN 9781616080792.
- Jonason, T.; Olsson, S. (2011). Agent Tate: The Wartime Story of Harry Williamson. Stroud: Amberley. ISBN 9781445604817.
- Juárez, J. (2004). Juan Pujol, el espía que derrotó a Hitler (in Spanish). Barcelona: Temas de Hoy. ISBN 9788484603726.
- Latimer, J. (2001). Deception in War. New York: Overlook. ISBN 9781585672042.
- Macintyre, B. (2012). Double Cross: The True Story of the D-Day Spies. London: A & C Black. ISBN 9781408821404.
- Masterman, J. (2013). The Double-Cross System: The Classic Account of World War Two Spy-Masters. New York: Vintage. ISBN 9780099578239.
- Pujol, J.; West, N. (1985). The Personal Story of the Most Successful Double Agent of World War II. New York: Random House. ISBN 9780307888778.
- Rankin, N. (2009). A Genius for Deception: How Cunning Helped the British Win Two World Wars. Oxford: OUP. ISBN 9780199756711.
- Seaman, M. (2004). Garbo: The Spy Who Saved D-Day. Toronto: Dundurn. ISBN 9781554881765.
- Talty, S. (2012). Agent Garbo: The Brilliant, Eccentric Secret Agent Who Tricked Hitler and Saved D-Day. Boston: Houghton Mifflin. ISBN 9780547614816.
