= Desmond Bristow =

British intelligence officer (1917–2000)

Desmond Arthur Bristow (1 June 1917 – 5 September 2000) was a British intelligence officer during World War II, head of the Spanish section of the British intelligence service in Spain after the war.

== Early years ==
Desmond Bristow was born in Birmingham on 1 June 1917, the son of a mining engineer. He grew up in Punta Humbría, Spain, where his first language was the Spanish spoken in Andalusia, a dialect of Castilian. He was educated at Dulwich College and Magdalene College, Cambridge, where he read modern languages (French and Spanish) and captained the college at rowing. A daredevil spirit, Bristow once raised money for Poppy Day by setting himself on fire with petrol before jumping into the River Cam.

== Second World War ==
At the outbreak of World War II, he joined the Oxfordshire and Buckinghamshire Light Infantry, before being recruited by British intelligence services.

In 1941, MI6 officials turned their attention to Bristow because of his knowledge of Spain and his fluency in Spanish. He was assigned to Section V (d), which was responsible for organising counterintelligence measures in Spain and Portugal. In his early service and training, he served under Kim Philby.

During the Second World War, he lived in Gibraltar, where he was a captain in the British intelligence services. He was responsible for monitoring relations between Franco's regime and Nazi Germany, as well as helping to combat sabotage in Gibraltar. For his network of spies in Spain, he had the collaboration of Spanish tobacco smugglers.

Between 1942 and 1945 he was involved in numerous strategic deceptions in the Mediterranean theatre. Together with Kim Philby, he helped recruit Garbo, one of the Allies' most successful double agents.

== After the war ==
After the war, after serving in Gibraltar, Algiers and Lisbon, Bristow became station chief of the British intelligence services in Spain and Portugal, head of British espionage in Madrid. Among his tasks was preparing for the arrival of the first British ambassador to the Spanish capital after Franco's triumph. He also advised on Spanish-British commercial operations.

He left MI6 in 1954, disenchanted by the climate of suspicion. His last post, from 1953 to 1954, was head of the Strategic Trade section. He moved to live with his wife in Periana, in the south of Spain.

After leaving MI6, he worked for a time with Percy Sillitoe, former director general of MI5, investigating the illicit trade in smuggled diamonds in West Africa.

He died on 5 September 2000 in the hospital of La Axarquia, in Vélez-Málaga, Spain. His wife, Betty Weaver, whom he married in 1941, survived him, as well as two sons and two daughters. His body was cremated and his ashes placed in a niche in the English Cemetery in Málaga.

== Publications ==
His memoirs were to be published in 1993 as A Game of Moles, one of the first written by an MI6 agent. The British secret service made several attempts to dissuade him and he was warned that he could be sent to prison if he published them.

Finally, Bristow decided to publish them first in Spanish, under the title Juego de topos (Barcelona: Ediciones B, 1993). He was not prosecuted thanks to the protection of the European courts.

He dedicated his memoirs to the memory of Spanish and Portuguese friends who helped him fight fascism: 'To all those Spanish and Portuguese collaborators who, in silence, and often at great risk, supported the Allied cause without reserve.'

== Acknowledgements ==
Desmond Bristow was awarded the Legion of Honour and the Croix de Guerre avec Palm in 1947.
