= Francesc Miralles i Galaup =

Spanish painter

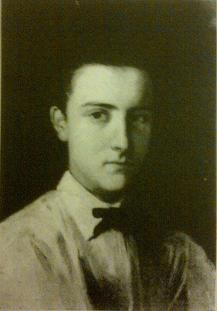
Self-portrait, aged sixteen (1864)

Francesc Miralles i Galaup (6 April 1848, Valencia – 30 October 1901, Barcelona) was a Spanish painter, best known for his realistic scenes of bourgeois life and high society.

== Biography ==
His family was involved in several businesses enterprises. When he was five, they sold some of their interests and relocated to Barcelona. In 1855, he was enrolled at the new Collegi Maristes Valldemia in Mataró, a private Catholic school. While there, he began to scribble drawings in his notebooks and became convinced that he should be an artist. His parents, naturally, wanted him to continue with the family business.

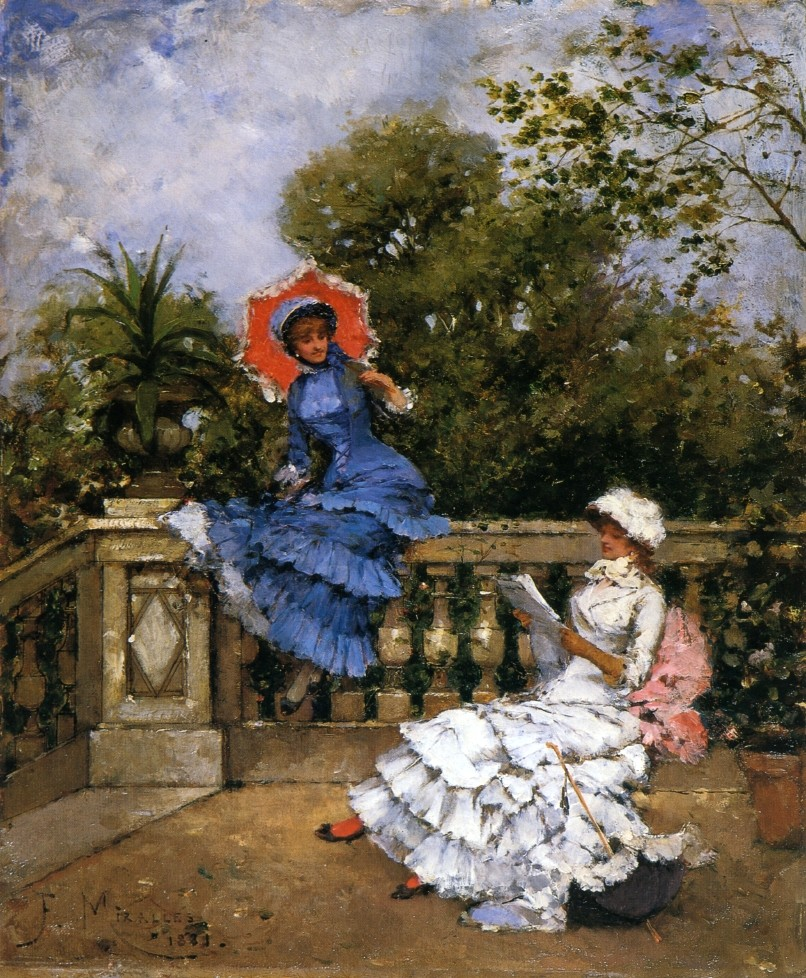
Lecture in the Garden (1883)

After seeing him in his father's office, drawing pictures on the ledgers and paperwork, they relented and, in 1862, found him a place in the studios of Ramon Martí Alsina, where he studied for several years. He soon displayed an interest in figure painting, as opposed to his teacher's favored landscapes.

=== Years in Paris ===
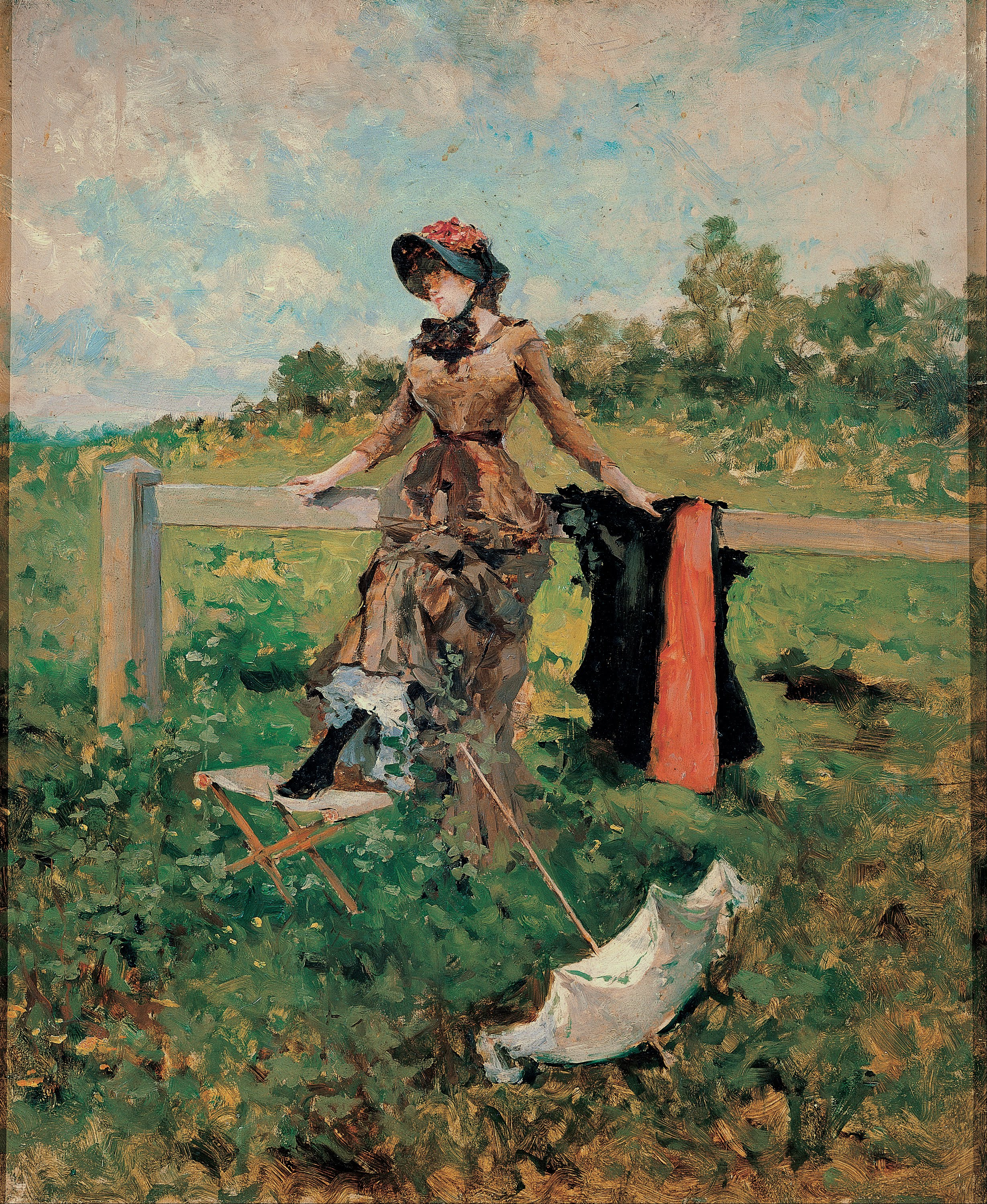
Lady with a Parasol

When he turned eighteen, he received parental permission (and financial support) to study in Paris, where he would remain until 1893, with occasional visits home. During his first years there, he copied masterworks at the Louvre and may have worked briefly with Alexandre Cabanel. He eventually had several small studios in Montmartre and on the Rue Laffitte.

He exhibited regularly at the Salon and the Sala Parés, back home in Barcelona. He also became a client of the well-known art dealership Goupil & Cie, attracting wealthy buyers throughout Europe and America. This was a relief to his family, who had initially been concerned that they might have to support him indefinitely. Their ability to do so had been compromised as they had lost much of their fortune in the Panic of 1866 and were losing more of it as they paid off their debts. In fact, they eventually moved to Paris so he could help support them.

=== Return to Barcelona ===
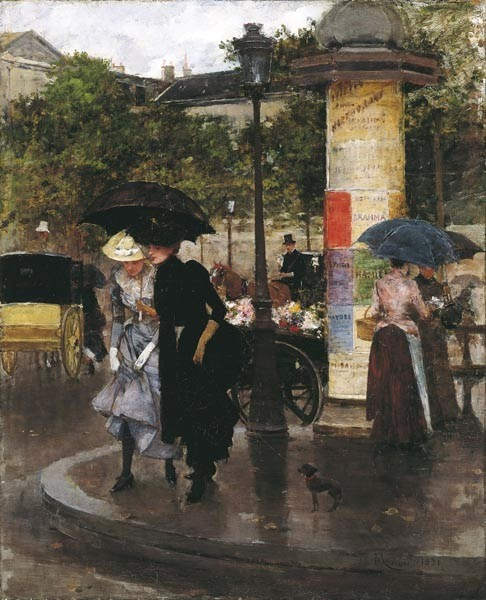
Street Scene on a Rainy Day (c.1891)

He suffered from chronic bronchitis so, after his parents had died (within a year of each other), he decided to return to Barcelona, seeking a milder climate. His sister Carmen had already returned there years before, after her marriage, so he had no relatives left in Paris. Rumors, however, suggested that his real reason for leaving was that his paintings were going out of style. Whatever the reason, he arrived in Barcelona in 1893 and his home soon became a gathering place for the creative community. He continued to exhibit at the Salon in Paris, but never repeated his earlier successes. To help him re-establish himself, his brother-in-law, Salvador Andreu (a wealthy manufacturer and philanthropist), obtained a commission for him to decorate the ceiling of a new private concert hall at the Liceu.

He had never truly gotten over the loss of his mother. By 1898, Carmen had become seriously concerned about his increasing isolation and worsening health. Salvador agreed that something should be done, so he persuaded Miralles to live in "The Towers", a small house next to theirs where he would have more company, but his health continued to decline. One day, they came to visit and found him lying in front of his easel, dead from an apparent heart attack.
