= Joan Jordi Miralles =

Spanish novelist in Catalan language (born 1977)

- Born: 1977 (age 48–49); Huesca, Spain
- Writing career
- Language: Catalan

Joan Jordi Miralles (Huesca, 1977) is a Spanish novelist in Catalan language. He is also a playwright and screenwriter. His first novel won the 2004 Andròmina Prize and this most recent one was awarded the 2017 Joanot Martorell Prize.

== Works ==
- Aglutinació (Edicions 62, 2018)
- Els nens feliços (Males Herbes, 2016)
- Una dona meravellosa (LaBreu, 2014)
- Això és Àustria (Lleonard Muntaner, 2012)
- L'úter de la balena (Moll, 2010)
- L'Altíssim (Tres i Quatre, 2005)
