= Maristes Valldemia =

Coordinates: 41°32′37″N 2°26′34″E

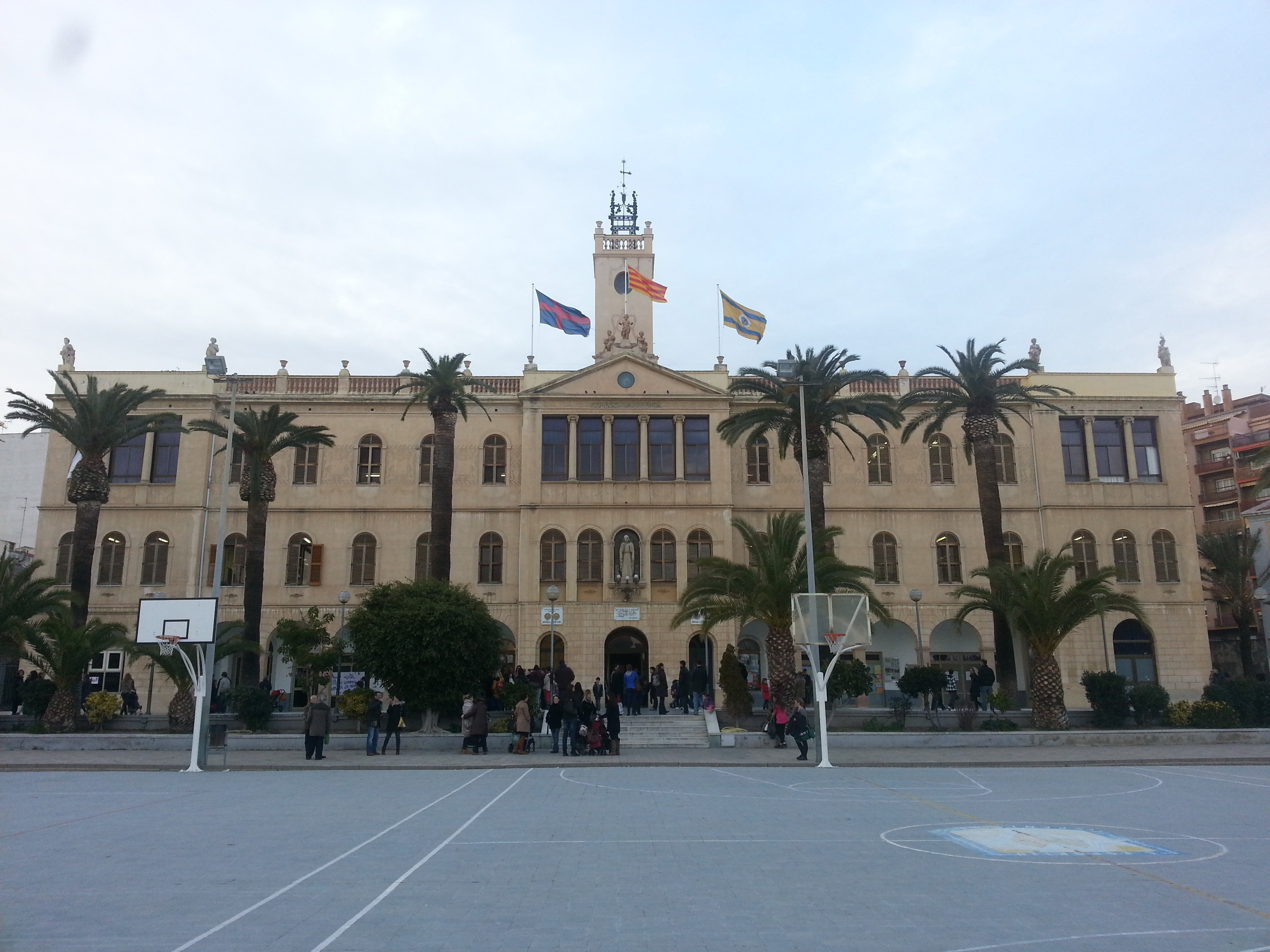
- Maristes Valldemia school main building
- 161, La Riera St. Mataró, Province of Barcelona - Catalonia; Spain

Information
- Religious affiliations: Marist Brothers, Christianity
- Denomination: Catholicism
- Founded: 1855
- Faculty: 90
- Age: 3 to 18
- Enrollment: 1200 (2007)
- Language: Catalan, Spanish, English, French
- Campus: Col·legi Valldemia (Mataró)
- Website: www.maristesvalldemia.com

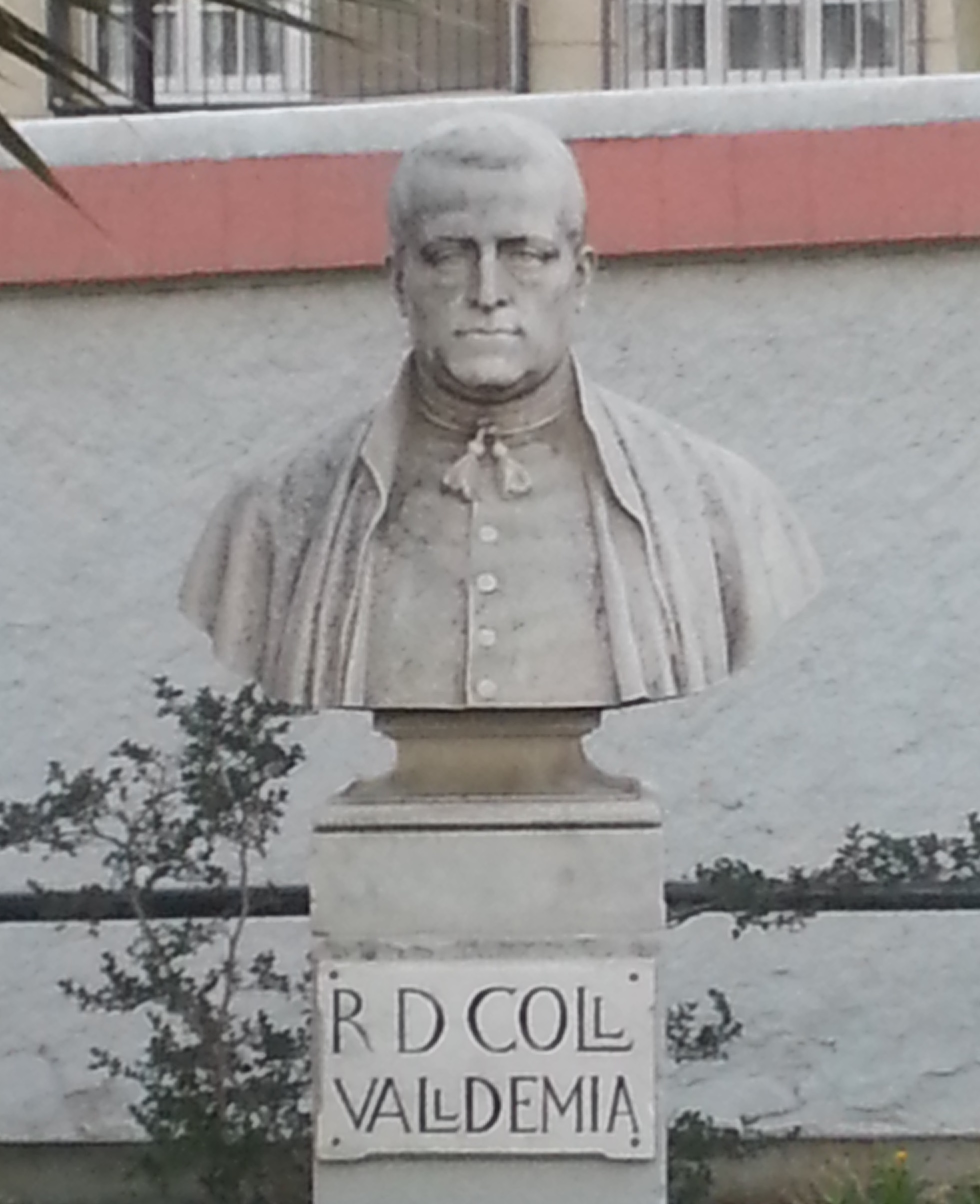
Ermengol Coll de Valldemia, the founder.

The Maristes Valldemia school (aka: Col·legi Maristes Valldemia, Col·legi Valldemia or Valldemia), is located in Mataró, Province of Barcelona - Catalonia (Spain). It is a catholic school run by Marist Brothers, and dedicated to Our Lady the Virgin of the Candle. The ownership is held by Fundació Champagnat, Fundació Privada.

The school was founded in 1855 by three Piarists related persons: the priest Hermenegild Coll i Valldemia, Pelegrí Ferrer and Ramon Cuspinera. Its first naming was «Colegio de Cataluña», and was located at the land of the masia (traditional Catalan manor) of Can Miralpeix. The school had the objective to provide a modern and Christian education. Beyond 1858 was known as «Col·legi de Valldemia» (in Catalan) or «Colegio de Valldemia» (in Spanish). In 1888 was given to the Marist Brothers to run it, till nowadays. From 2012 the official name is "Maristes Valldemia".

The main building was designed by the architect Jeroni Boada, and posteriorly improved in 1911 by Josep Goday i Casals (who used to be an alumn of the school, and founder member of the Alumni Association). The building is catalogued as a Bé Cultural d'Interès Local (Catalan: Local Cultural Heritage) at the Inventari del Patrimoni Arquitectònic de Catalunya (Catalan: Inventory of Architectural Heritage of Catalonia) as IPA-8680.

The school received its first international recognition at the Paris Exposition in 1900, a gold medal in recognition of quality education. During the convulsive years that marked the Spanish Civil War, Valldemia was converted into a hospital and blood bank.

Today, the school has 1200 students from ages 3 to 18, who are taught by a staff of 90 teachers.

== Alumni ==
- Josep Goday i Casals - (1882 - 1936) - Catalan architect linked to Noucentisme
- Juan Pujol García - (1912 – 1988) - World War II British double agent aka “Garbo”
- Enric Sagnier i Villavecchia - (1858 – 1931) - Catalan architect.
- Antonio Vergara Fernández - Nuclear Engineer linked to CERN's LHC project.
- Felip Vall i Verdaguer (1916-2012) Catalan painter, also Mural painter. He did a mural on the Valldemia school at the entrance of the Chapel. Mural paints in the church of Sant Pere de les Puel·les, Barcelona.
