= Fred Hermann Brandt =

German entomological collector, botanist and Nazi secret agent (1908–1994)

Fred Hermann Brandt (21 May 1908 – 30 November 1994) was a German entomological collector, botanist and Nazi secret agent in World War II who worked in Iran and Afghanistan during the 1930s.

== Biography ==
Brandt was born in St. Petersburg and grew up in Latvia. His brother, Wilhelm Brandt (1904–1982), was an entomologist who specialised in butterflies particularly of Papua New Guinea, and through his brother Fred also became interested in the field. In the Second World War, he became a counter-espionage agent and rose to the rank of Colonel within the German Wehrmacht and led a Brandenburg Battalion in 1939-40. An Afghan government mission to Berlin noted the problem of leprosy and the German government offered to help with a “leprosy research commission” which was headed by Dr Manfred Oberdörffer. Oberdörffer was invited by the Afghan government and he chose Brandt as an assistant. Brandt's knowledge of Russian, Iranian, Arabic and Islamic culture were considered key skills. Labelled by the British media as "the crafty butterfly colonel" they set up camp on the Waziristan border and joined the tribes there. On 15 July 1941 the pair took over a British field station in Waziristan and were attacked by Afghan troops. In the ensuing gun battle, they were both injured and Oberdörffer died of injuries on the way to Kabul while Brandt spent three months in hospital before being repatriated to Germany in November 1941. The main aim of their mission had been to recruit Mirza Ali Khan, a Waziri guerrilla leader known as the Fakir of Ipi to help in attacking British targets. Hearing that many German officers were being shot as traitors by the Nazi leadership, he joined British officers at Lezha and travelled to Bari as a prisoner of war.

Brandt was later taken prisoner by the Soviets and was held in custody until 1955.

Brandt wrote a memoir of his army service in 1973.

Some of the lepidopteran specimens collected by Brandt were studied later and some new species were described. Scythris brandti is named after him, as is Eupithecia fredi. His collections are deposited along with those of his brother Wilhelm Brandt in the Naturhistoriska riksmuseet at Stockholm.

The standard author abbreviation F.H.Brandt is used to indicate this person as the author when citing a botanical name.
