= Francisco Miralles (writer) =

Chilean engineer and writer

Francisco Miralles (Santa Cruz, Colchagua, October 4, 1837 — Santiago, May 14, 1890) was a Chilean engineer, painter and writer known for his influence on the science fiction genre of Chilean literature.

== Biography ==
Engineer, artist and writer, he studied mathematics and natural sciences at the National Institute of Chile. He graduated as an engineer in 1856 and was appointed member of the Geodesic Commission. Shortly thereafter he was appointed to the same position in the Southern Railroad. Addicted to the fine arts, he later dedicated himself to painting and photography, being the inventor of an original system of oil portraits. In the portrait genre he excelled as a painter. In 1874 he published his scientific discovery of extracting drinking water from the sea, at a lower price than that produced by distilling machines.

In 1877, he published in the newspaper La República a series of articles of customs in the form of romances, describing notable personalities of the political world, subscribed under the pseudonym of Saint Paul. In 1879 he inserted in El Nuevo Ferrocarril several literary articles, making a portrait of the personalities of the time that made the most outstanding figure in literature and politics. He wrote biographical profiles of figures such as Miguel Luis Amunátegui and Federico Errázuriz Echaurren.

In the Revista Chilena he published an interesting study on La Teoría de los colores and his novel Avelina, which merited a pleasant critical review by the erudite commentator Pedro Antonio Pérez [Kefas]. He contributed articles of diverse literary nature in Los Tiempos, La Patria, Las Novedades and El Ferrocarril. Among his most notable writings are those entitled La pintura en Chile, José Joaquín Pérez, Miguel Luis Amunátegui and Eulogio Altamirano. He was involved in a literary polemic, in La Patria de Valparaíso, with Eduardo de la Barra Lastarria, about literature and arts, in which he said that the illustrious Chilean poet had portrayed himself as Lord Byron because he believed he had the incarnation of his genial soul.

In 1877 he published an original and entertaining book, of ingenious fantasy, entitled Desde Júpiter, a kind of idealistic dreams, like the philosophical and astronomical imaginations of Flammarion, and considered the first works of science fiction in Chilean literature. His work combined elements of his training in both visual arts and literature.

He died on May 14, 1890, in Santiago de Chile of stomach cancer.
