= Anti-Socialist Union =

- Abbreviation: ASU
- Formation: 1908
- Founder: R. D. Blumenfeld
- Dissolved: 1949
- Location: United Kingdom

The Anti-Socialist Union was a British political pressure group that supported free trade economics and opposed socialism. The group was active from 1908 to 1949, with its heyday occurring before the First World War.

== Formation ==
Coming from the same laissez-faire economic position as contemporaries such as the Liberty and Property Defence League and the British Constitution Association, the ASU was established in 1908 by Daily Express Editor R. D. Blumenfeld. It claimed to be non-political, but its main membership came from the Conservative Party. The ASU campaigned against the social reforms that were brought in by the Liberal Party governments of Henry Campbell-Bannerman and H. H. Asquith and denounced them as socialist initiatives.

== Activities ==
The group was active in the election campaigns of January and December 1910, and some of its rallies and meetings ended in violence. Keir Hardie was a focus of its activity. Enjoying a circulation of some 70,000 for its journal around that time, the ASU included a young Stanley Baldwin in its membership. Other leading members in the early years included William Hurrell Mallock, Walter Long and Samuel Hoare.

The group went on hiatus during the First World War and was revived initially under the name Reconstruction Society before it became the Anti-Socialist and Anti-Communist Union. It attacked such figures as Harold Laski and Maurice Dobb and also attempted to prove links between the Labour Party and the Soviet Union. By then, however its role had largely been usurped by the British Empire Union, and with no local branch structure, it struggled for influence. Nonetheless, the group claimed that between 1918 and 1922, it has organised around 10,000 meetings.

Although avowedly a free-trade movement, the ASU found itself linked with the fascist movements that began to emerge in the 1920s, largely because of their shared opposition to communism. Under the presidency of Brigadier-General R.B.D. Blakeney, the British Fascists (BF) forged links with the ASU with a number of ASU members from military backgrounds joining the BF. Leading ASU figures such as George Makgill, John Baker White and even Blumenfeld became associated with the BF. Nesta Webster, a leading BF ideologue, was also a member of the ASU and wrote and researched a number of its publications. Also, the chairman of the ASU was Wilfrid Ashley, who would later also serve as chairman of the Anglo-German Fellowship. Harry Brittain, who enjoyed a close friendship with Joachim von Ribbentrop, was a member of the Executive Committee of the ASU.

In an attempt to counter the growing support for socialism in sections of the working class, the group also began to advocate some vaguely-corporatist initiatives such as profit-sharing schemes for workers. Generally, however, the ASU disavowed fascism and did not formally work with any fascist groups.

== Dissolution ==
The group continued until 1949 when it was wound up and turned its assets over to the Economic League.
