= Neil Francis Hawkins =

British fascist writer & politician (1907-1950)

- Born: September 1907; United Kingdom
- Died: 26 December 1950 (aged 43); United Kingdom
- Occupation: Salesman
- Known for: Fascist politician and writer
- Title: Director-General of Organisation
- Political party: British Fascisti; British Union of Fascists; Union Movement
- Relatives: Lilian Bristol (sister), John Hawkins (ancestor)

Neil Lanfear Maclean Francis Hawkins (September 1907 – 26 December 1950) was a British writer and politician who was a leading proponent of British fascism in the United Kingdom both before and after the Second World War. He played a leading role in the British Union of Fascists and controlled the organisational structure of the movement.

== British Fascisti ==
Francis Hawkins joined the British Fascisti (BF) around the time of its inception, became a member of the three-man Headquarters Committee and was seen by many of the male members as a preferable leader to Rotha Lintorn-Orman. Under the influence of Francis Hawkins and his close ally E. G. Mandeville Roe, the BF, which, despite its name, had been fairly conservative in nature, moved towards a more genuinely fascist position by emphasising the corporate state and anti-Semitism. Without Lintorn-Orman's approval, he held a series of talks with Robert Forgan in which he agreed in principle the idea of merging the BF into the New Party. However, when Francis Hawkins presented the plan to the BF Grand Council, it was rejected by a single vote.

== British Union of Fascists ==
The rejection of the merger resulted in a sharp division between Francis Hawkins and Lintorn-Orman and as a result he split the organisation in 1932 and took the bulk of the membership with him into Oswald Mosley's British Union of Fascists, the name under which the New Party had been reconstituted. Francis Hawkins had met with both Mosley and Forgan and had been so impressed with their setup that he split the British Fascists to join them. Francis Hawkins was appointed National Defence Force Adjutant upon joining the party, making him deputy head of the group's paramilitary Blackshirts under the command of Eric Hamilton Piercy. He rose quickly through the ranks, holding the posts of Officer in Charge of the London Area and Chief Administrative Officer before being appointed Director-General of Organisation, a post that made him effectively second in command behind Mosley. On 22 June 1935, he replaced Piercy as head of the Blackshirts. In July 1935, he briefly became head of the BUF Women's Section during a period of restructuring for the movement and became the only man to hold that position.

As the leading member of the movement after Mosley, it was Francis Hawkins who developed the notion of BUF members wearing a black shirt under an ordinary suit, an important step for the movement to retain its identity following the banning of uniforms in the Public Order Act 1936. A firm believer in militarism, Francis Hawkins led the military faction within the BUF that successfully resisted the attempts of the likes of John Beckett, Bill Risdon and F.M. Box to convert the BUF into a more normal political party. His power was consolidated by his appointment as Director-General in 1936, a newly created post that gave him power both the political and administrative aspects of the BUF. He advocated a membership based on unmarried men, like himself, and argued that they would give the most fanatical devotion to the movement. He gained a reputation as a workaholic at BUF HQ and he was equally noted for his personal loyalty to Mosley, but he also had a strong influence over his leader and was identified by Special Branch as being responsible, along with William Joyce, for convincing Mosley to embrace anti-Semitism. Mosley would later describe him as "a man of outstanding character and ability". He was particularly valued by Mosley for his skill as an organiser and bureaucrat.

In 1936, F.M. Box, who had been deputy leader and Francis Hawkins's main rival, left the movement because of the growing influence of the militarists on Mosley. That decision left Francis Hawkins in effective control of the organisation of the BUF. He was thus appointed Director General of Organisation. His power ensured he undertook a reorganisation of the structure of the BUF by setting up training programmes for local election agents and adding a more intellectual party organ Action alongside the existing and more low-brow Blackshirt, in an attempt to attract more middle-class party members.

His overall control of BUF organisation led to clashes with other leading figures, particularly the party's failure in the 1937 London County Council election, which led to criticism of his methods by William Joyce and John Beckett. A few days after this public clash, Francis Hawkins announced a series of cost-cutting measures at BUF headquarters, including the dismissal of several paid officials, including Joyce and Beckett, who established the National Socialist League the following month. Francis Hawkins continued to increase his power base with his two main internal rivals removed by spring 1938. A. K. Chesterton, one of the BUF's younger propagandists, had also resigned and cited Francis Hawkins' increasing role in policy development as a major reason.

== Later life ==
Immediately after the outbreak of war he met with the leaders of other groups such as the Nordic League, the Right Club, The Link and the British Peoples Party in a failed attempt to organise a united front under Mosley. He also held meetings with Lord Tavistock aimed at finding a similar common course. Although he volunteered for war service, Francis Hawkins was arrested along with Mosley and others under the first wave of Defence Regulation 18B swoops in 1940. Held in internment in Stafford and Brixton Prisons for much of the war, he was released in 1944 and concentrated on his business interests.

Francis Hawkins maintained a fairly low profile following his release and worked for a time as a salesman for a Derby-based firm. Involved in the foundation of the Union Movement in an organisational capacity, Francis Hawkins did not take a leading role because of his failing health. He also took no public role in the new group. He died from bronchial asthma on Boxing Day 1950 at the age of 43.

== Personal life ==
Francis Hawkins was a descendant of the sailor John Hawkins. A salesman of surgical instruments by trade, he never married and it has been claimed he was gay.

He had a sister Lilian whose husband, A.C.V. Bristol, was a member of the BUF but was also secretly an agent for MI5.
