= R. B. D. Blakeney =

British Army general

Brigadier-General R. B. D. Blakeney CMG DSO
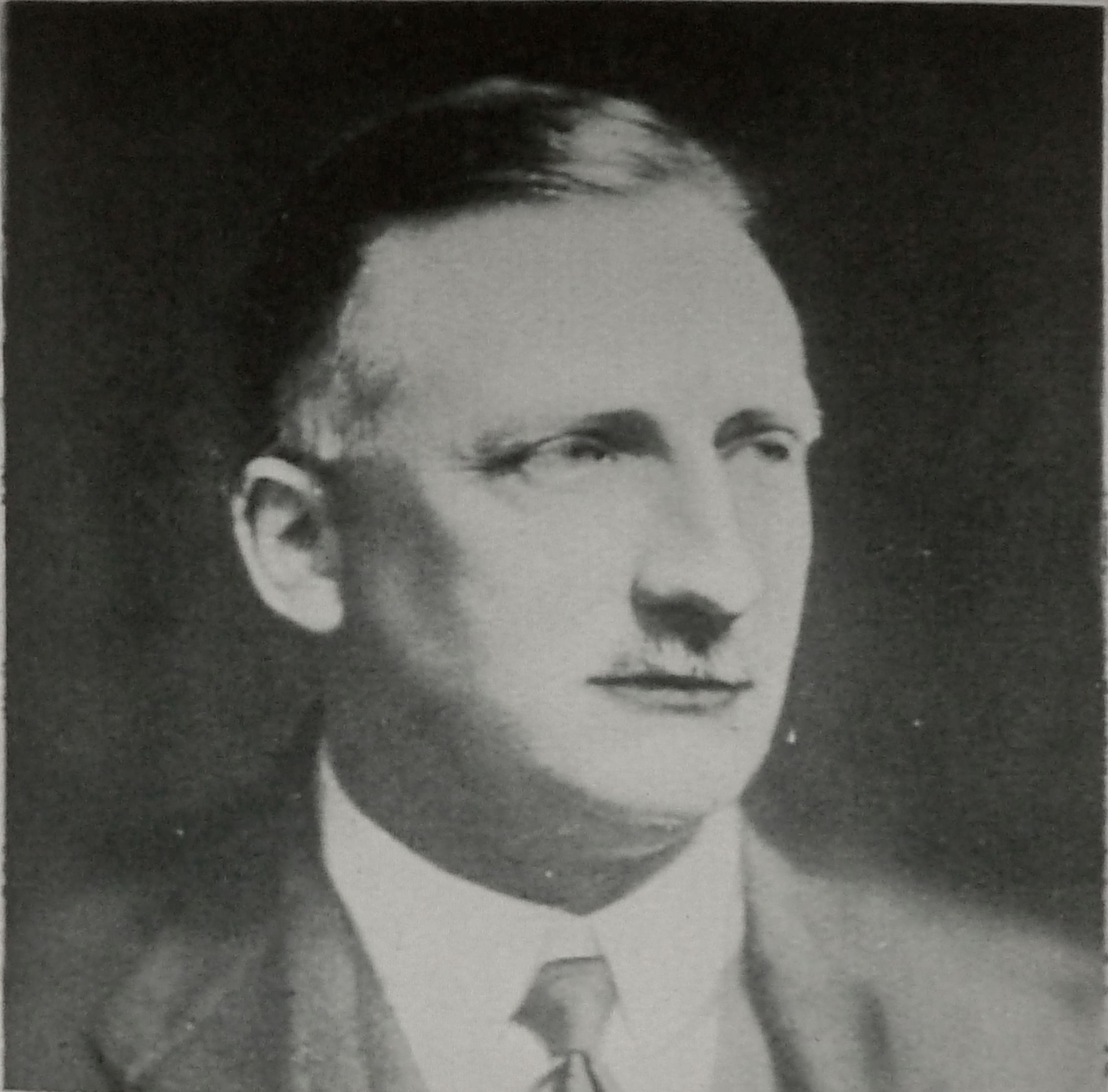
- Born: Robert Byron Drury Blakeney; 18 April 1872
- Died: 13 February 1952 (aged 79)

Robert Byron Drury Blakeney (18 April 1872 – 13 February 1952) was a British Army officer and fascist politician. After a career with the Royal Engineers, Blakeney went on to serve as President of the British Fascists.

== Military and empire service ==
Blakeney was commissioned a second lieutenant in the Royal Engineers on 24 July 1891, and promoted to lieutenant on 24 July 1894.

Blakeney served in the Dongola Expedition under Sir Herbert Kitchener in 1896, and was involved in the 1898 Battle of Omdurman, for which he received the Distinguished Service Order (DSO). He had been one of six subalterns working on the Sudan Military Railway under Percy Girouard. During the Second Boer War (1899–1902) he commanded the 3rd Balloon Section of the Royal Engineers from 1899 to 1900 in one of the later examples of the use of military ballooning, with the local rank of major from 7 March 1900. He later served on the staff in South Africa and was promoted to the substantive rank of captain on 1 July 1902, after the war had ended.

Following his service with the Royal Engineers, Blakeney followed a career in railway administration in Egypt. By late 1902 he was working with the Egyptian State Railways, and in 1906 he was appointed deputy general manager of the company, and was promoted to full manager in 1919, a role he held until 1923. He was awarded the Imperial Ottoman Order of the Medjidie (third class) by the Khedive of Egypt in early 1903.

In 1922, he was made an honorary brigadier-general.

== British Fascists ==
An early member of the British Fascisti, Blakeney succeeded Leopold Ernest Stratford George Canning, 4th Baron Garvagh as president of the movement in 1924, and at the same time was made editor of their journal The Fascist Bulletin. In his role as president he developed a rigid military style structure for the BF, whilst also ensuring that it altered its name from the Italian "Fascisti" to the more English "Fascists". He insisted that the BF be run in "the spirit of intelligent patriotism" and sought to build links with mainstream right-wing pressure groups such as the Anti-Socialist Union.

Despite his role as president, Blakeney's knowledge of fascism as an ideology has been portrayed as somewhat sketchy. For Blakeney, the BF were the adult version of the Scout movement, arguing that they shared such values as fraternity, duty and service. He felt that the main enemy of the BF was communism. Indeed, Blakeney believed that one of the main duties of the BF was to be prepared to defend established society in the event that "the swarms from the slums" came out in revolution. He also argued that the "Italian methods pure and simple" could not be applied to Britain in the same manner as in Italy as he felt the British were less prone to communism and more prone to apathy when compared to the Italians.

Along with his close ally Rear Admiral A. E. Armstrong, Blakeney supported BF involvement with the Organisation for the Maintenance of Supplies and accepted government terms that the movement should, at least temporarily, abandon references to fascism in order to participate in the government-backed group. He was opposed in this by BF founder Rotha Lintorn-Orman and the BF Grand Council opposed Blakeney's position, voting 40–32. Unperturbed, Blakeney and his supporters split from the BF to form a group called the Loyalists; this group was absorbed by the OMS immediately following the outbreak of the 1926 General Strike. The Earl of Glasgow and Lord Ernest Hamilton—like Armstrong, two influential BF members—also endorsed Blakeney's approach and followed him into the Loyalists.

== Later activities ==
Following Blakeney's involvement in the OMS, he became associated with the Imperial Fascist League (IFL) and spoke at a number of their events. At one such engagement in November 1933, Blakeney, along with League leader Arnold Leese, was beaten up by supporters of the British Union of Fascists (BUF) at a time when this movement was striking out at its rivals on the far right. According to Nicholas Mosley, Blakeney left the encounter with a black eye and Oswald Mosley would subsequently concede that his stewards had got out in control with the violence they meted out to the IFL that day. Despite this, Blakeney would later take a minor role in the BUF and contributed a number of articles to their Action and Blackshirt journals.

As well as political parties, Blakeney was involved in the semi-clandestine far-right elite societies active in interbellum Britain. During the 1920s, he became a member of the Britons and later he would also serve with the equally exclusive Nordic League. However, unlike many of his contemporaries in British fascism, Blakeney was not interned during the Second World War but rather served with the Home Guard.

== Religious beliefs ==
Blakeney was a strong believer in Christianity and was also noted for his somewhat prudish attitudes towards what he dubbed "nasty sex nonsense" amongst the young, which he largely blamed on left-wing subversives attempting to destroy the moral rectitude of the British Empire, views he largely shared with BF ideologue Nesta Webster. Strongly interested in Theosophy, Blakeney was a member of the Liberal Catholic Church and close friend of Edith Starr Miller.
