= National Fascisti =

British fascist party

- Founder: Lt. Col. Henry Rippon-Seymour
- Founded: 1924
- Dissolved: 1928
- Split from: British Fascists
- Ideology: British fascism British nationalism National conservatism Social conservatism Anti-capitalism; Anti-communism; Antisemitism
- Political position: Far-right
- Colors: Red White Blue

The National Fascisti (NF), renamed British National Fascists (BNF) in July 1926, were a splinter group from the British Fascisti formed in 1924. In the early days of the British Fascisti the movement lacked any real policy or direction and so this group split away with the intention of pursuing a more definite path towards a fascist state. The group had 60 members at its creation, and around 500 at its height.

== Formation ==
The National Fascisti's leader was Lieutenant Colonel Henry Rippon-Seymour. Members of the National Fascisti were dressed in black shirts in imitation of Benito Mussolini and his followers and received some military drilling, although membership was much too small for them to pose any real threat. Despite their frustrations at the lack of policy from the British Fascisti their own ideas were fairly banal, with vague calls for a government of experts being about as far as they went. Strongly anti-communist, they argued that their aim was to "smash the reds and pinks". Antisemitism, which at that point was absent from British Fascisti policy, also played a role in the new group. They also called for "racial purity" and the consolidation of the British Empire.

== Development ==
The group liked to pull stunts to get attention and in 1925 they hijacked a lorry carrying copies of the left-wing newspaper the Daily Herald which they proceeded to crash. The action briefly got them in the headlines as did a meeting at Hyde Park, London where 1000 people attended and finished the day in a pitch battle with Communist Party of Great Britain supporters. The group also ran boxing and fencing clubs to train members although ultimately their strident militarism, which included marching with drawn swords, drew them more derision than support.

Like the British Fascists (BF) they contacted the Home Secretary in the run-up to the 1926 General Strike to offer their services to the Organisation for the Maintenance of Supplies. Rippon-Seymour refused to follow the lead of BF chairman R. B. D. Blakeney in breaking from fascism and so his offer was turned down flat by the government. As individuals National Fascisti members were however allowed to enter the Special Constabulary during the strike, which many did.

== Disappearance ==
Cracks began to show in the group, notably around December 1926 when Rippon-Seymour pulled a sword and an unlicensed gun on Croydon branch leader Charles Eyres after Eyres has accused the leader of defrauding the party out of funds and of dictatorial leadership. Eyres had brought a gang of cudgel-wielding supporters from Kensington to confront Rippon-Seymour whilst the leader's use of the Colt revolver, which actually belonged to "Victor Barker", saw him convicted of both possession of an illegal firearm and common assault at the Old Bailey.

In 1927 a leading member was Victor Barker, a transvestite who spent many years as 'Sir Victor Barker', 'Colonel Ivor Barker' and 'Captain Barker. The National Fascisti members did not know he was born female and treated him as a man; Arkell-Smith became secretary to Rippon-Seymour as well as training members in the boxing and fencing clubs.

A series of internal struggles saw them change their name to the British National Fascists on 19 July 1926, under the leadership of Rippon-Seymour. Meanwhile, leading members such as Colonel Ralph Bingham drifted from the group to become active instead in the Organisation for the Maintenance of Supplies. Such a small group could not withstand internal wrangling and the movement faded from the scene fairly quickly after this.

== Significance ==
Despite their general failure the National Fascisti remain significant for being the first group in British politics to attempt to develop fascism as a specifically British ideology. They also helped to launch the political careers of William Joyce and Arnold Leese, who had helped to instigate the split from the British Fascisti and who would go on to greater significance: Joyce became a notorious Nazi collaborator under the codename of "Lord Haw-Haw", while Leese would go on to establish his own Imperial Fascist League.

== See also ==
- List of British fascist parties
