= British fascism =

Political ideology

The flash and circle symbol was first used by the British Union of Fascists (BUF).

British fascism is a form of fascism which is promoted by some political parties and movements in the United Kingdom based on British ultranationalism and imperialism. It has contained aspects of Italian fascism and Nazism during its history, both before and after the Second World War.

Historical examples of fascist organisations in Britain include the British Fascists (1923–1934), the British National Fascists (1924–1928), the Imperial Fascist League (1929–1939), the British Union of Fascists (1932–1940), the British League of Ex-Servicemen and Women (1937–1948), the National Socialist League (1937–1939), The Link (1937-1940), the British People's Party (1939–1954) and the Union Movement (1948–1978). More recent examples of British fascist groups include the British Movement (1968–1983), the National Front (1967–present), the British National Party (1982–present), Britain First (2011–present), National Action (2013–2017), and the Sonnenkrieg Division (2015–2020). Parties inspired by British fascist movements include the New Zealand National Front (1968–2019) and the Australian Protectionist Party (2007–present).

== Ideology ==
=== Origins ===
British fascism, like other forms of fascism, lacks a common "intellectual genealogy"; it developed its ideas from various sources, British and foreign. British fascism acknowledges the inspiration and legacy of Italian fascism and Nazism but it also states that it is not a mere application of a "foreign" ideology, alleging roots within British traditions. Early British fascism, as seen in the British Fascists, initially had "little evidence of fascism in its ideology". It evolved its ideals in response to conservative influences on the domestic scene and the post-war anti-labour movement. From Italian fascism it took inspiration of strong leadership and strong opposition to communism.

Although later British fascism, as seen in the British Union of Fascists, was inspired by ideas such as the Corporate State in Italian fascism, its proponents asserted that both its economic and political agenda intended to embody that of Tudor England (1485–1603). It claimed that its advocacy of a centralised national authoritarian state was based upon the Tudor state's hostility to party factions and to self-interested sectional interests, and upon the Tudor goal of national integration through a centralised authoritarian state. Supporters saw the Tudor state as a prototype fascist state. In 1935 A. L. Glasfurd, a member of the British Union of Fascists (BUF), praised Henry VII's subjugation of "lawless barons who had brought about the Wars of the Roses"; he also praised the "Tudor dictatorship" for introducing national policies and restrictions on the export of English capital by self-serving private speculators. Glasfurd also praised the Tudor state for instituting a planned economy that he claimed was a predecessor of the "scientific" national economic planning of fascism.

British fascism also claimed the legacy of Oliver Cromwell, who dominated the British Isles in the 1650s; Oswald Mosley claimed that Cromwell brought about "the first fascist age in England". English political theorist Thomas Hobbes in his work Leviathan (1651) systematised the ideology of absolutism that advocated an all-powerful absolute monarchy to maintain order within a state. Hobbes' theory of absolutism became highly influential in fascist theory. British fascists claimed that their corporatist economic policy was in accord with England's historical medieval guild system, with its enlightened regulation of wages, prices and conditions of labour providing precedents for a British fascist corporatist economic system.

Specific policies could take ideas and inspiration from theorists and politicians of various stripes: for instance, as well as being informed by Italian and Nazi fascism, Mosley's economic policy took inspiration from Keynes and Roosevelt. Mosley is also seen as taking political and economic arguments from the Edwardian radical right and was influenced by Hegel and Nietzsche.

=== Tenets ===
There have been a number of British fascist groups, each with their own emphases; some less developed than others. Below are tenets shared by many of the groups, or those set out by the most established groups.

==== Societal degeneration and renewal ====
Like others on the right, British fascists diagnose the nation as in decline and under threat. For the BUF, the fragmenting of the British Empire and the changes in gender roles following WWI were examples of the weaknesses of British society. The BUF and the Union Movement described the weaknesses they saw in misogynistic terms, equating them with femininity. The decline was blamed on liberalism and outside (usually Jewish) influences and propagandists.

The fascist cure to this decline was renewal of the nation. Renewal for the BUF included the assertion of masculinity as virile, strong, hard and fortitudinous, and saw man as rightfully the authority. Under a Britain run by Mosley's fascists, girls would be educated up to the age of 15 so that they would be able to serve their families and the nation, and married women would be allowed to work but wouldn't need to because men, who are better suited to work, would receive higher wages so husbands would provide for their families. Mosley called for a 'return of seriousness and the restoration of social values' to curb homosexuality.

==== Nationalism and racialism ====
The British Union of Fascists (BUF) sought to unify the British nation in a number of ways. The division between workers and employers, for instance, would be resolved, they argued, by the "machinery of government" (i.e., the corporate state) providing an "equitable distribution of the proceeds of industry" to those involved.

The BUF also sought to bridge the divide between Protestant and Catholic Britons, and in particular it sought to appeal to Catholic Irish living in Britain. The BUF declared support for complete religious toleration. BUF Leader Sir Oswald Mosley emphasised the "Irish Connection" and the BUF held both Protestant and Catholic religious branches. Mosley condemned the Liberal government of David Lloyd George for being responsible for allowing reprisals between Catholics and Protestants in Ireland. As a result of the BUF's conciliatory approach to Catholics, it gained a substantial support amongst Catholics, and several BUF leaders in Hull, Blackburn, and Bolton, were Catholics. Support by Catholic Irish in Stepney for the BUF increased after the outbreak of the Spanish Civil War that involved clerical traditionalist and fascist forces fighting against an anti-clerical government.

On racial issues, the various British fascist movements held different—although invariably racialist—policies. Mosley's BUF believed that culture created national and racial differences—a policy closer to the views on race by Italian fascism rather than German Nazism. Initially the BUF was not explicitly anti-Semitic. In April and May 1933, the BUF newspaper The Blackshirt wrote that antisemitism was not an inherent characteristic of fascism. Rather, BUF considered it to be attributable to the specific German circumstances. On the contrary, Jewish issue was unknown to the Italian fascism, which BUF considered as "perfect". The BUF's ideology was in fact based upon the views on race of Austrian Jewish sociologist Ludwig Gumplowicz and Scottish anthropologist Arthur Keith, who defined race formation as the result of dynamic historical and political processes established within the confines of the nation state and that the defining characteristics of a people were determined by the interaction of heredity, environment, culture, and evolution over a historical period of time. However, Mosley later prominently asserted anti-Semitism, invoking the theory of German philosopher Oswald Spengler, who described that Magian Jews and Faustian Europeans were bound to live in friction with each other. In contrast to the Nazis, however, Mosley's anti-Semitism was largely conspiratorial rather than racial, with Mosley often stating "he was against the Jews not for what they were, but for what they did". Arnold Leese's Imperial Fascist League, on the other hand, promoted pro-Nazi racial policy including anti-Semitism.

The British Union of Fascists differed from other fascists in viewing the evolution in neo-Lamarckian terms. Lamarckism viewed the adaptation in terms of the interaction between the mind and will of man and the environment, rather than in terms of random mutation and natural selection like Darwinism. Mosley and the BUF emphasized the willpower as the prime agent of the evolution. Therefore, he viewed the main changes in the history as being driven by the social and cultural factors rather than the physical. The adaptation, according to Mosley, was a response to the events and the will to transform the reality. Like German philosopher Oswald Spengler, Mosley viewed the race as a feature of culture, expression of its symbols and values. Mosley wrote that "biology begins again to teach that the wilful determination of the species to rise above the limitations of material environment is the dominating factor in evolution. … In fact every tendency in modern science assures us that in superb effort the human spirit can soar beyond the restraint of time and circumstance." Mosley synthetized the Nietzschean and Christian values. He believed that fascism was the will to power harnessed into the service of community. He wrote: "every Blackshirt is an individual cell of a collective Caesarism. The organised will of devoted masses, subject to a voluntary discipline and inspired by the passionate ideal of natural survival, replacing the will to power and a higher order of the individual superman". Mosley developed his thoughts from heroic vitalism and creative evolutionism. He believed that Europe was facing a historic crisis, and that it would have been overcome through a strong will, ushering Europe into the new order. Mosley argued that Spengler was mistaken in his cultural pessimism, instead claiming that fascism based on modern science could rejuvenate Western culture. He came to see fascism as a "mutiny against destiny", writing that "rise of the National Socialist and Fascist doctrine throughout Europe represents in historic determinism the supreme effort of modern man to challenge and overcome the human destiny which in every previous civilisation has ordained irretrievable downfall".

Mosley argued against immigration, adopting the motto "Britain for the British". However, he wrote in 1938 that he did not consider the German Nazi racial policy appropriate for Britain, because Britain, unlike Germany, possessed an empire which consisted of many different races, and thus it would be inappropriate to adopt laws which would stigmatise any race within the empire. Mosley argued against race-mixing and considered the preservation of "British race" and its culture as important, however, he argued that the same approach would extend to other races as well. In particular, he criticized the imposition of the Western culture on other races of empire, such as Indians, writing: "Fascist teaches pride of race and racial culture. Under Fascism, Indian leaders will arise to carry forward their own traditions and culture within the framework of Empire and the modern world of science". Regarding Jews, Mosley told them: either adopt "Britain First" or leave.

==== Pan-Europeanism ====
The BUF considered fascism as a "European tradition", "European movement", a new spirit of transformation, stronger than national distinctions. It believed that fascism would one day "unite Europe in a new civilization". In June 1934, Robert Gordon-Canning wrote that the "local patriotisms" in Europe would give a way to the "greater patriotism to the unified country". However, before that, it would be necessary to build nations with sound and well-balanced economic basis. In 1936, Oswald Mosley warned of the possibility of the "brother's war" in Europe, instead, urging them to focus on the Soviet Russia. However, Mosley considered British fascism as a unique movement, and wrote that Britain would assume the leading role in the world, with Germany as a complementary, since Germany did not strive to build a worldwide empire, as it considered this to be a threat to its racial purity. Mosley, on the other hand, thought that Britain would maintain racial purity while maintaining its empire as well.

After the defeat of the Axis powers in 1945, Sir Oswald Mosley founded the Union Movement (UM) as the successor to his inter-war BUF. The Union Movement diverged from the BUF's focus on British nationalism and instead focused on promoting the idea of Pan-European nationalism. Mosley's pan-Europeanism was inspired by German philosopher Oswald Spengler and his concept of unity of European culture and its primary Faustian symbols.

==== Leadership ====
For the BUF, only a dictator could bring to an end the weaknesses of the current political and economic system and bring in and manage the new. The dictatorship would not be constrained by committees and talk but would be defined by action. Mosley's idealised fascist leader was stylised in his post-war writing as the "Thought-Deed Man", described by Daniel Sonabend as "a philosopher, scientist and statesman combined, a man whose genius allowed him to see how the world should be, and then, through his prodigious will, make it so".

Mosely tried to assuage the British public's fears about a dictator by saying they could vote the government out if necessary (and the monarch would select new ministers to take their places). Other members of the BUF, however, advocated for a dictator in the style of Italy's or Germany's, as did Arnold Leese of the Imperial Fascist League.

==== Corporatism ====
For Mosley, the corporate state was to give the nation its direction: it would set the limits within which individuals and the economy function and "[w]ithin these limits all activities would be permitted and private enterprise and profit-making encouraged". Foremost, this politics was to be economic: (Note: See, in this article, the section on Economics.) employers' groups and employees' groups within their specific industries would be grouped together into "corporations" that represented their sector (e.g., agricultural, iron and steel, textiles, etc.—there would be twenty of them) in a National Corporation and the government would nominate consumer representatives. The corporations would make decisions on prices, output, and competition, and on expansion and contraction of industries. The corporatism of the BUF was often talked about using the metaphor of the (healthy, youthful, athletic) body, in which "[e]very organ plays a part in relation to the whole and in harmony with the whole".

Corporatist policies would also be spread to the empire. It was seen as natural that the Dominions would accept these policies as it would be beneficial to them. The spread of corporatist policies would have also led to an increased hold on India and British fascists argued that it would have improved working conditions there.

==== Economics ====
In economics, the BUF opposed both socialism and laissez-faire economics for being an outmoded system and proposed instead a national syndicalist economic system guided by a corporate state. (Note: See, in this article, the section on Corporatism.) While Mosley was against liberal or, as Matthew Worley puts it, "untrammelled" capitalism, he wasn't against the system as a whole—rather, he wanted to retain capitalism and "make it more perfect". For Mosely, a more perfect system was for the State to manage capitalism, (Note: Compare Benewick: "The economic system would be radically altered, but the foundation and the system itself would be preserved. The corporate state would be superimposed upon capitalism, rather than substituted for it".) with the government regulating "the factors of supply and demand by the manipulation of wages and price levels". Mosley declared: "Capitalism is a system by which capital uses the nation for its own purposes. Fascism is a system by which the nation uses capital for its own purposes". Thus, Webber categorises Mosley as a "capitalist statist" and Rubin describes the BUF's economics as "fascist capitalism". The BUF also wanted Britain and its empire to be self-sufficient, an autarky.

In contrast to Mosley, Imperial Fascist League leader Arnold Lees was, according to Webber, an "anti-capitalist statist". He had "old-fashioned" solutions to economic issues, wanting to "re-establish a form of pre-industrial aristocratic rule in which industrial interests were to be controlled by political appointees and financial interests made the servant of the state by tightening control over investments".

==== Foreign policies ====
The fascism of the BUF had "selective pacifism": it was non-interventionist and argued against war when it was not in defence of the United Kingdom or the British Empire. It believed the only threat to the British Empire was from the Soviet Union. In defence of this policy Mosley pointed to Benjamin Disraeli who opposed going to war with Turkey over its mistreatment of Armenians.

BUF and IFL economic policies were isolationist, desiring Britain and its empire to be an autarky.

==== Militarism ====
BUF militarism was strong: for William Joyce, "war and imperialism were the ultimate expressions of national identity against which there could be no valid objections". Leese of the IFL was of a similar opinion.

==== Traditionalism and modernism ====
The BUF declared support for the British monarchy, regarding the monarchy as a beneficial institution for its role in bringing Britain to preeminence in the world, and seeing it as a symbol of Britain's imperial splendour. Its support went as far as "Absolute loyalty to the Crown" with Mosley saying that British fascists aimed to "in every way maintain its dignity".

The BUF declared its support for complete religious toleration, but also declared that it sought to merge both religious and secular spheres of the nation into a "higher harmony" between church and state, by supporting political representation for leading clerics in the House of Lords and state maintenance for religious schools for those who demanded them. The BUF declared its support for Christianity and its opposition to atheism, saying "atheism will perish under British Union; Christianity will find encouragement and security, in which it may prosper to the glory of its Creator".

The BUF stressed the need for Britain to be linked to modernity, especially in economics. Mosley had declared such in 1931 in addressing the action needed in response to the onset of the Great Depression: "we have to face modern problems with modern minds, we should then be able to lift this great economic problem and national emergency far above the turmoil of party clamour and with national unity could achieve a solution adequate to the problem and worthy of the modern mind". They found "the money spent on both scientific and technical research [was] absurdly inadequate".

== History ==
=== Origins ===
In the period after the First World War, there was unrest and change in the United Kingdom and the British Empire: unrest in Egypt, for instance, civil war in Ireland, the rise of Indian nationalism in the British Raj, strikes in Scotland; the Russian Revolution had begun in 1917 and was inspiring people; the labour movement was gaining more importance; more people had been given the right to vote. According to historian Liam Liburd, organised fascism began in Britain because "the forces of diehard conservatism, a sort of semi-aristocratic movement of ex-military men and of Tory peers", were fearful about these challenges to the British status quo and connected them together with belief in a Jewish world plot. Historian Camilla Schofield summarizes these "early threads" of British fascism as "imperial anxiety, revulsion towards the undiscipled masses, fear of communism, and antisemitism" and to them adds "stories of a glorious, unblemished past". Within months of Mussolini taking power in Italy (his government forming on 31 October 1922), organised British fascism had begun (the first British group with "fascists" in its name was the British Fascists, which formed on 6 May 1923), inspired by what they saw as Mussolini taking charge of a weak parliamentary system and instilling discipline and national pride, and getting rid of corruption in government. According to historian Martin Pugh, British fascists argued there were the same kind of problems they saw in Italy within Britain and its empire so a political movement similar to the one now ruling Italy would be beneficial to Britain.

=== British fascism before the BUF ===
The interwar fascist group that left the most indelible mark on Britain was Oswald Mosley's British Union of Fascists (BUF), founded in 1932; but Britain's first avowedly fascist group, the British Fascists (BF), formed a decade earlier, in 1923, a matter of months after Mussolini took power in Italy. (Note: Another group, the Loyalty League, formed in October 1922, weeks before Mussolini took power, is described by Barbara Farr as "modelled on Italian Fascist lines".) The BF was inspired more by Mussolini's example than his ideology, perhaps, at least initially, being "fascist in name only". The uniting threads for members of the group were anti-communism and the British status quo: they were concerned about the labour movement, the Labour party's leftist politics, and communism, which they saw as the threat to Britain and its empire. Of 1920s British fascism, G. C. Webber says members of the movements wanted a "stronger dose of conservatism than the Conservative Party could or would provide", and the BF was no exception: it was "basically a Conservative movement", attracting the "Die Hards" in the Conservative party, members of the military and the aristocracy, advocating for the interests of the aristocracy and the Conservative vote. The BF was active in strikebreaking and stewarding for far-right and Conservative speakers. Its lack of truly fascist ideology and tepid action led to members defecting to other fascist groups and the accusation by Arnold Leese, who left the BF and lead the Imperial Fascist League, of being "conservatism with knobs on".

The rest of the decade before the formation of the BUF was marked by the formation and splintering of a number of smaller fascist groups. (Note: Fascist groups formed before the BUF (formed 1932) include, but are not limited to, the Loyalty League (1922), the British Fascists (1923), (perhaps another group called the Loyalty League (1923),) National Fascisti (1924), Italian Fascismo (1924), British Empire Fascists, Fascist Movement (both mid-1920s), Yorkshire Fascists (1920s), Stamford Fascists (1926), Kensington Fascist Party (late 1920s), Imperial Fascist League (1928), English Mystery, British Union, Legion of Loyalists, New Movement (all late 1920s/early 1930s), the Unity Band (1930).) The BF, the largest of this period, peaked at a membership of several thousand but dwindled by the early 1930s to between 300 and 400 members. Other groups, like a BF splinter group the National Fascisti, were more ideologically fascist but smaller, drew little attention and had little impact — "their actions were limited to petty demonstrations and acts of vandalism" — although it was through these groups that leading fascists of the 1930s developed. For instance, along with Arnold Leese, Nesta Helen Webster, Neil Francis Hawkins, E.G. Mandeville Roe, H.J. Donavan, and William Joyce all started in the BF. Fascism in Britain became mainstream, however, with the establishment of the Mosley's British Union of Fascists.

=== British Union of Fascists ===
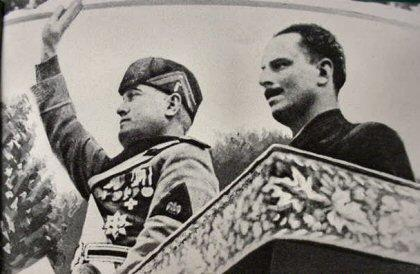
Italy's Duce Benito Mussolini (left) with Oswald Mosley (right) of the BUF during Mosley's visit to Italy in 1936

The British Union of Fascists (BUF) was formed by Sir Oswald Mosley in October 1932 following his failed attempt to start a more traditional political party, the New Party. The BUF was "Britain's most intellectually coherent fascist movement". Mosley's main policy was economic: an imperialist, isolationist economy that would pull Britain out of the Great Depression. For the BUF, this new economic policy, in which the state would use capitalism for its own purposes, could only be achieved under the leadership of a dictator, supported by elected experts. The current political system, according to the BUF, was old, slow and unfit for the modern age. The BUF marked itself as a modern movement with an interest in technology, and also saw itself connected and loyal to British traditions and history, like the monarchy and the Tudors. It received funding from both Italy's National Fascist Party and Germany's Nazi Party.

A number of smaller fascist groups formed and splintered during the years the BUF operated, (Note: Fascist groups formed during the time the BUF operated include, but are not limited to, the British United Fascists (1933), British Empire Fascist Party (1933), United Empire Fascist Party (1933), Scottish Fascist Democratic Party (1933), the Nordics (early 1930s), Scottish Union of Fascists (1934), Nordic League (1935), Anglo-German Fellowship (1935), English Array (1936), the National Socialist League (1937), The Link (1937), White Knights of Britain (1937), the British Democratic Party (late 1930s), the British People's Party (1939).) but it was Mosley's group that had most public success. The BUF had its peak membership — between 40,000 and 50,000 members — in its first few years of existence, partly because of the support the fascists received from the Daily Mail and the Sunday Dispatch. Mosley, too, was a charismatic leader and people were attracted to what Bret Rubin calls the "flash and zeal" of the movement. The group attracted people from across the political spectrum, although most of its members were from families that supported the Conservative party, people for whom British fascism was "a more staunch expression of their toryism, a surer way to preserve the empire, support the monarchy, and continue to agitate for an ethnically homogeneous nation". It aimed a lot of its attention at recruiting young members and was more than an outlet for political interests, running branch activities, dances, camps. Women comprised a quarter of its membership.

Active membership of the group declined to about 5,000 in 1935 following a rally they held at the Olympia exhibition centre in London on 7 June 1934. During the rally, anti-fascist hecklers were beaten up by BUF stewards. Although this was not the first time this happened, this time it resulting in disastrous publicity for the BUF. Lord Rothermere, the owner of the Daily Mail and the Sunday Dispatch, removed his public support for the group. However, support still came from both urban and rural areas and membership possibly increased to about 16,000 by late 1936, a level at which it stayed until the end of the decade (see below), at which point it increased to about 22,500.

Following Olympia, the BUF's antisemitism became more prominent. Bret Rubin contends that, as the BUF's concepts were not taking hold, the group was "pressured to conform to existing fascist stereotypes" in a bid for popularity. (Note: Compare Benewick: "Policy was often manipulated with callous disregard for principles so that at least one of the themes, anti-Semitism, gained ascendancy over the B.U.F.'s proposals for reform. Policy was hinged to the likelihood of an impending economic crisis and attempts were made to locate the cause and to prescribe its resolution. As the probability of an economic crisis — and hence political power — grew remote, the possibility of an international crisis was stressed.") Mosley considered this new tack the reason for the increase in membership his group experienced in the mid-1930s. However, Rubin continues, rather than being accepted by mainstream Britain, the BUF became "a safe haven for anti-Semites, lonely military officers, and radical pseudo-intellectuals", and "the average Briton regarded him as a dangerous and violent would-be despot". The BUF was regarded as not fascist enough by the Imperial Fascist League, however.

The Battle of Cable Street in 1936 dealt another blow to the BUF, where Mosley was seen as an inspirer of hate and the level of popular opposition towards the BUF was illustrated. At least 6,000 policemen charged with protecting the up-to 5,000 strong fascists' march through a Jewish area of London clashed with an anti-fascist counterdemonstration of at least 100,000 people. Then the BUF suffered from the Public Order Act 1936, passed in 1937 in part in response to Cable Street, which banned political uniforms and paramilitarism. According to Bret Rubin, by 1937 Mosley had become a political pariah, "the hated leader of a radical oppositional movement".

The BUF still had moderate public support, however, and membership rose when it started its anti-war campaign in 1938. By September 1939, membership was about 22,500. Following the start of World War II and fearing a fifth column supporting the Axis powers, the BUF was banned in May 1940 under Defence Regulation 18B; just under 800 of its members were imprisoned, including most of its leadership. Other fascist groups, including The Link, the Imperial Fascist League, and the Nordic League, also closed, or ceased public activity, as war approached. However, British fascist organisations and individuals still operated during WWII.

=== British National Party ===
The British National Party (BNP) is a British fascist political party. Founded in 1982, it reached its greatest level of success in the 2000s, when it had over fifty seats in local government, one seat on the London Assembly, and two Members of the European Parliament.

Taking its name from that of a defunct 1960s far-right party, the BNP was created by John Tyndall and other former members of the fascist National Front (NF). During the 1980s and 1990s, the BNP placed little emphasis on contesting elections, in which it did poorly. Instead, it focused on street marches and rallies, creating the Combat 18 paramilitary — its name a coded reference to Nazi German leader Adolf Hitler — to protect its events from anti-fascist protesters. A growing 'moderniser' faction was frustrated by Tyndall's leadership, and ousted him in 1999. The new leader Nick Griffin sought to broaden the BNP's electoral base by presenting a more moderate image, targeting concerns about rising immigration rates, and emphasising localised community campaigns. This resulted in increased electoral growth throughout the 2000s, to the extent that it became the most electorally successful far-right party in British history. By the 2015 general election, the BNP's membership and vote share had declined dramatically, groups like Britain First and National Action had splintered off, and the English Defence League had supplanted it as the UK's foremost far-right group.

Ideologically positioned on the extreme-right or far-right of British politics, the BNP has been characterised as fascist or neo-fascist by political scientists. Under Tyndall's leadership, it was more specifically regarded as neo-Nazi. The party is ethnic nationalist, and it once espoused the view that only white people should be citizens of the United Kingdom. It calls for an end to non-white migration into the UK. It called initially for the compulsory expulsion of non-whites but, since 1999, it has advocated voluntary removals with financial incentives. It promotes biological racism and the white genocide conspiracy theory, calling for global racial separatism and condemning interracial relationships. Under Tyndall, the BNP emphasised anti-semitism and Holocaust denial, promoting the conspiracy theory that Jews seek to dominate the world through both communism and international capitalism. Under Griffin, the party's focus switched from anti-semitism towards Islamophobia. It promotes economic protectionism, Euroscepticism, and a transformation away from liberal democracy, while its social policies oppose feminism, LGBT rights, and societal permissiveness.

Operating around a highly centralised structure that gave its chair near total control, the BNP built links with far-right parties across Europe and created various sub-groups, including a record label and trade union. The BNP attracted most support from within White British working-class communities in northern and eastern England, particularly among middle-aged and elderly men. A poll in the 2000s suggested that most Britons favoured a ban on the party. It faced much opposition from anti-fascists, religious organisations, the mainstream media, and most politicians, and BNP members were banned from various professions.

== See also ==
- Fascism
- Fascism in Europe
- List of British fascist parties
- List of fascist movements
- List of fascist movements by country
- Radical right (Europe)

== Works cited ==
=== Books ===
- Benewick, Robert (1972). The Fascist Movement in Britain (revised ed.). London: Allen Lane. ISBN 0713903414. S2CID 159244065.
- Copsey, Nigel (2008). Contemporary British Fascism: The British National Party and the Quest for Legitimacy (2nd ed.). London and New York: Routledge. ISBN 978-0230574373.
- Goodwin, Matthew J. (2011). New British Fascism: Rise of the British National Party. London and New York: Routledge. ISBN 978-0-415-46500-7.
- Gottlieb, Julie; Linehan, Thomas, eds. (2004). The Culture of Fascism: Visions of the Far Right in Britain. London: I.B. Tauris. ISBN 978-6000007669. S2CID 152532761.
- Grant, Moyra (2003). Key ideas in politics. Cheltenham: Nelson Thornes. ISBN 978-0748770960.
- Griffin, Richard (1980). Fellow Travellers of the Right: British Enthusiasts for Nazi Germany, 1933–1939. London: Faber and Faber. ISBN 978-0571310142. S2CID 159391973.
- Johari, J. C. (2007). Contemporary Political Theory: New Dimensions, Basic Concepts and Major Trends. Sterling Publishers. ISBN 978-8120769922. S2CID 142010910.
- Lewis, D. S. (1987). Illusions of Grandeur: Mosley, fascism, and British society, 1931–81. Manchester: Manchester University Press. ISBN 978-0719023545. S2CID 157700688.
- Linehan, Thomas (2000). British Fascism, 1918–1939: Parties, ideology and culture. Manchester: Manchester University Press. ISBN 978-1-5261-6220-5. JSTOR j.ctv29mvt76. S2CID 160105334.
- Mosley, Oswald (1938). Tomorrow We Live.
- Mulhall, Joe (2021). British fascism after the Holocaust: From the Birth of Denial to the Notting Hill Riots 1939–1958. Abingdon, Oxon: Routledge. doi:10.4324/9780429452628. ISBN 978-1138624146. S2CID 225211802.
- Pugh, Martin (2006). 'Hurrah for the Blackshirts!': Fascists and Fascism in Britain between the Wars. London: Random House. ISBN 978-1-4481-6287-1. S2CID 153730325.
- Schlembach, Raphael (2016). Against Old Europe: Critical Theory and Alter-Globalization Movements (1st ed.). Abingdon: Routledge. ISBN 978-1-3155-6615-3. S2CID 142003056.
- Sonabend, Daniel (2019). We Fight Fascists: The 43 Group and Their Forgotten Battle for Post-war Britain. London: Verso. ISBN 978-1-78873-324-3.
- Thurlow, Richard (1987). Fascism in Britain: A History, 1918–1985. Oxford: Blackwell. ISBN 978-0-631-13618-7. S2CID 160293380.
- Thurlow, Richard (2006). Fascism in Britain: From Oswald Mosley's Blackshirts to the National Front (2nd ed.). I.B. Tauris. S2CID 159224663.
- Trilling, Daniel (2012). Bloody Nasty People: The Rise of Britain's Far Right. London: Verso. ISBN 978-1-84467-959-1.
- Webber, G. C. (1986). The ideology of the British Right, 1918–1939. New York: St Martin's Press. ISBN 978-0709936718.

=== Book chapters ===
- Dack, Janet (2015). "Cultural regeneration: Mosley and the Union Movement". In Copsey, Nigel; Richardson, John (eds.). Cultures of Post-War British Fascism. Routledge. pp. 8–26. doi:10.4324/9781315727257-2. S2CID 202306976.
- Gottlieb, Julie (24 May 2008). "British Union of Fascists". Oxford Dictionary of National Biography (online ed.). Oxford University Press. doi:10.1093/ref:odnb/96364. (Subscription, Wikipedia Library access or UK public library membership required.)
- Linehan, Thomas (2005). "The British Union of Fascists as a Totalitarian Movement and Political Religion (Totalitarian Movements and Political Religions)". In Griffin, Richard (ed.). Fascism, Totalitarianism and Political Religion. Vol. 5. Routledge. pp. 397–418. doi:10.1080/1469076042000312195. S2CID 144204062.
- Morell, John (2017). "Arnold Leese and the Imperial Fascist League: The Impact of Racial Fascism". In Lunn, Kenneth; Thurlow, Richard (eds.). British Fascism: Essays on the Radical Right in Inter-War Britain. Routledge. pp. 150–165. ISBN 978-0312101305.
- Rawnsley, Stuart (2017). "The Membership of the British Union of Fascists". In Lunn, Kenneth; Thurlow, Richard (eds.). British Fascism: Essays on the Radical Right in Inter-War Britain. Routledge. pp. 150–165. ISBN 978-0312101305.
- Williamson, Phillip (2010). "The Conservative Party, Fascism and Anti-fascism: 1918–1939" (PDF). In Copsey, Nigel; Olechnowicz, Andrzej (eds.). Varieties of Anti-Fascism: Britain in the inter-war period. Palgrave Macmillan. pp. 73–97. doi:10.1057/9780230282674_4. ISBN 978-1-349-28231-9. S2CID 153061484.

=== Journal articles ===
- Rubin, Bret (2010). "The Rise and Fall of British Fascism: Sir Oswald Mosley and the British Union of Fascists" (PDF). Intersections. 11 (2): 323–380.
- Schlembach, Raphael (2011). "The Transnationality of European Nationalist Movements". Revue belge de Philologie et d'Histoire. 89 (3): 1331–1349. doi:10.3406/rbph.2011.8359.
- Stocker, Paul (February 2015). "'The Imperial Spirit': British Fascism and Empire, 1919–1940". Religion Compass. 9 (2): 45–54. doi:10.1111/rec3.12142. S2CID 142586985.
- Webber, G. C. (1984). "Patterns of Membership and Support for the British Union of Fascists". Journal of Contemporary History. 19 (4): 595. doi:10.1177/002200948401900401. ISSN 0022-0094. JSTOR 260327. S2CID 159618633.
- Worley, Matthew (January 2011). "Why Fascism? Sir Oswald Mosley and the Conception of the British Union of Fascist". History. 96 (321): 68–83. doi:10.1111/j.1468-229X.2010.00507.x.

=== Articles ===
- Barling, Kurt (4 October 2011). "Cable Street: 'Solidarity stopped Mosley's fascists'". BBC News.
- Feldman, Matthew (2018). "The Radical Right in Britain". www.gale.com.
- Gottlieb, Julie (2 November 2021). "Fascism in inter-war Britain". British Library.
- Mason, Emma (23 February 2022). "Your guide to Oswald Mosley and the British Union of Fascists (BUF)". History Extra.
- White, Edward (2 December 2016). "Conservatism with Knobs On". The Paris Review.

=== News articles ===
- "Extremist neo-Nazi group to be banned under terror laws". BBC News. 24 February 2020.
- Bienkov, Adam (19 June 2014). "Britain First: The violent new face of British fascism". Politics.co.uk.
- Hooton, Christopher (8 May 2015). "BNP sees 99.7% drop in votes, party all but wiped out". The Independent. Archived from the original on 23 January 2016.
- Morris, Nigel (14 January 2015). "Green parties membership 'will overtake Ukip within a week', new". The Independent. Archived from the original on 15 January 2015.
- Sabin, Lamiat (25 October 2014). "Britain First threatens direct action on journalists over Lynda Bellingham claims". The Independent.

=== Booklets and pamphlets ===
- Mosley, Oswald (1933). 10 Points of Fascist Policy: Fascism Explained (PDF). London: BUF.
- Mosley, Oswald (1934). The Greater Britain (PDF). London: BUF. doi:10.5040/9781472599728.ch-002. ISBN 978-1-4725-9972-8. S2CID 162004984.
- Mosley, Oswald (1936). Fascism: 100 Questions Asked and Answered (PDF). London: BUF Publications. S2CID 190778999.
- Raven-Thompson, Alexander (1937). The Coming Corporate State (PDF). London: BUF. S2CID 155059894.
- A Workers' Policy Through Syndicalism. Union Movement. 1953.

=== Interviews ===
- Mosley, Oswald (15 November 1967). "Interview with Sir Oswald Mosley". The Frost Programme (Interview). Interviewed by David Frost. London: Rediffusion.

=== Podcasts ===
- Schofield, Camilla (19 February 2021). "Episode 1". Britain's Fascist Thread (Podcast). BBC Radio 4.
