= List of British fascist parties =

Although fascism in the United Kingdom never reached the heights of many of its historical European counterparts, British politics after the First World War saw the emergence of a number of fascist movements, none of which ever came to power.

== Pre-War ==
A flowchart showing the history of the early British fascist movement

A number of fascist movements emerged before the Second World War. Even before the March on Rome, Italian fascism gained praise in sections of the press, with articles appearing in both the Saturday Review and Pall Mall Gazette in 1921 and in The Times in 1922 praising the fascists for their strike-breaking and general anti-trade union activities. On 4 November 1922 a group of black-shirted admirers of Benito Mussolini held a remembrance service at Westminster Abbey which the Workers' Socialist Federation protested, both for the group being allowed to march to the abbey and for the fact that they were permitted to use a building as significant as Westminster Abbey in the first place. However it would be 1923 before any formal group seeking to connect itself to fascism would be formed. Whilst none of these gained any parliamentary representation some of them enjoyed wider notability. Amongst the more important groups that were founded were:

- The British Fascists (BF), founded in 1923 as the British Fascisti by Rotha Lintorn-Orman, one of the very few women to ever lead an avowedly fascist movement. Initially they had only a limited political platform but supported Italian fascism from 1931 to their demise in 1936.
- The National Fascisti, a splinter group of the BF founded in 1924 that from the outset fully supported the tactics of Benito Mussolini. They fell apart after another group, the British National Fascisti, broke away from them.
- The Imperial Fascist League (IFL), also a breakaway from the BF, formed by Arnold Leese in 1929. After Adolf Hitler came to power in Germany they embraced Nazism.
- The British Union of Fascists (BUF), formed in 1932 by Oswald Mosley as a successor to his New Party. The largest British fascist party, it absorbed members from other groups and called on the support of leading figures including members of the House of Lords, Commons, many Knights of the realm, as well as, for a time, the Daily Mail newspaper.
- The Militant Christian Patriots were a strongly anti-Semitic propaganda organisation that was formed around 1935 and briefly held a high-profile.
- The National Socialist League, a pro-Nazi breakaway from the BUF, formed in 1937 by William Joyce and John Beckett. It was wound up in 1939 when Joyce emigrated to Nazi Germany.
- The English National Association, initially called the British National Party, sought to bring together former BUF members during the war.
- The Scottish Fascist Democratic Party existed in the early 1930s under William Weir Gilmour. Weir Gilmour had been a candidate for the New Party but had refused to join the BUF as he felt it was dominated by Roman Catholics, whom he despised.

=== Minor movements ===
Alongside these several more minor groups that adhered to fascism were also established. Amongst those identified were:

- The British Democratic Party became involved in the Coordinating Committee, an initiative of Archibald Maule Ramsay in the late 1930s. Disagreements between member parties saw this fall apart in 1939.
- The British Empire Fascist Party, a very short-lived group set up by Graham Seton Hutchinson in November 1933. The group supported the establishment of the corporate state and was strongly anti-Semitic. Seton Hutchinson had intended to use the name for a merger between his own National Workers Party and the BF but the latter group backed out when they realised the lack of membership of that group.
- The British People's Party (BPP) was founded in 1939 and led by ex-British Union of Fascists (BUF) member John Beckett, a co-founder with William Joyce of the National Socialist League, active in 1937–1939.
- The British Union (not to be confused with the BUF, which used the name British Union after the outbreak of war) emerged in the early 1930s and worked with the BF.
- The British United Fascists were established in Kensington in 1933 where they had an office. They clashed with the BUF and had their office wrecked by some of that group's Blackshirts, resulting in the group disbanding soon afterwards.
- The British Empire Fascists is mentioned in some mid 1920s reports in Socialist Review although details are missing. The advocated cutting wages for the highest earners.
- The Fascist Movement was another 1920s splinter group from the BF, although little is known about it beyond its name.
- Italian Fascismo was established in Leith in 1924, with a black-shirted uniform. It was entirely mimetic of Italian fascism and seemed to exist only among Edinburgh's Italian community.
- The Kensington Fascist Party was set up in the late 1920s and existed well into the 1930s. Although it maintained an independent existence it tended to work closely with other, larger movements, including the BF, IFL and the Unity Band. In 1931 it was one of a number of minor movements to sign a document produced by the BF calling for the abolition of parliamentary government.
- The Legion of Loyalists was an early 1930s group, close to the BF. In 1931 it was one of a number of minor movements to sign a document produced by the BF calling for the abolition of parliamentary government. It later affiliated to the British Council Against European Commitments, a pro-German umbrella organisation founded by Viscount Lymington, in 1938. Robert Benewick calls this group the League of Loyalists.
- The Loyalty League emerged in 1922 as a group attached to the Conservative Party that sought to promote Italian fascism. The group is also described as having been established in 1923 and being strongly anti-Semitic in tone although, according to Thomas Linehan, this may have been a different group with the same name.
- The National Workers Movement, later National Workers Party, was the personal party of Graham Seton Hutchinson, and appeared to have few or even no members beyond its leader. The group, which maintained close links to the Nordic League, also used the name National Socialist Workers Movement/Party.
- The New Movement existed very briefly in the early 1930s and was most likely absorbed quickly by the IFL.
- The Nordic League, active between 1935 and 1939, sought to serve as a co-ordinating body for the various extremist movements whilst also seeking to promote Nazism.
- The Nordics were a small group of anti-Semitic "racial nationalists" who merged with the IFL in 1934. They were distinct from the Nordic League.
- The Scottish Union of Fascists was set up by T.W. Denholm-Hay in 1934 as a more Scottish-minded breakaway from the BUF. Links were established with Wendy Wood and her Democratic Scottish Self-Government Organisation although it made no headway, having only 70 members upon formation. It merged into the Scottish Party.
- The Stamford Fascists were a partial splinter group from the BF, established in 1926 when Arnold Leese and Henry Simpson were elected as councillors in Stamford in defiance of BF policy that members should not contest elections under the BF banner. Leese alone briefly changed this group into the Fascist League, before formally establishing the IFL in 1928.
- The United Empire Fascist Party was established by C.G. Wodehouse-Temple in December 1933 and included amongst its membership Serocold Skeels, a former IFL member and agent for Nazi Germany who was eventually expelled from the party for his anti-Semitism. The group soon changed its name to United British Party, establishing offices in London and Edinburgh, and adopted a grey-shirted uniform for a while. Despite this overt militarism, which it eventually abandoned, the UBP's Fourteen Points programme was largely bereft of fascist rhetoric.
- The Unity Band was established by Lieutenant-Colonel Oscar Boulton in 1930 and was widely known for its publishing output although it had few members beyond the highly active Boulton. In 1931 it was one of a number of minor movements to sign a document produced by the BF calling for the abolition of parliamentary government. The two groups split the following year and they competed for the leadership of the non-BUF fascist movement for the next few years. Linked to the Britons, the group had a strongly Christian ethos.
- The White Knights of Britain, also known as the Hooded Men, were a Ku Klux Klan-styled secret society that existed between 1937 and 1938. Deeply anti-Semitic, they used the swastika as their emblem and had Edward I of England as their patron saint due to his Edict of Expulsion against the Jews (although Edward was not a saint in any mainline Christian observance). It was close to the Nordic League, with E.H. Cole and T. Victor Rowe leading figures in both organisations.
- The Yorkshire Fascists emerged in the 1920s, probably from the BF and were still in existence by 1930, by which point they were close to the IFL.

== Post-war ==
After the Second World War a handful of groups emerged which looked directly to fascism and Nazism for their inspiration. Those who have openly done so (in contrast with parties which merely describe themselves as aligned with nationalism) are:

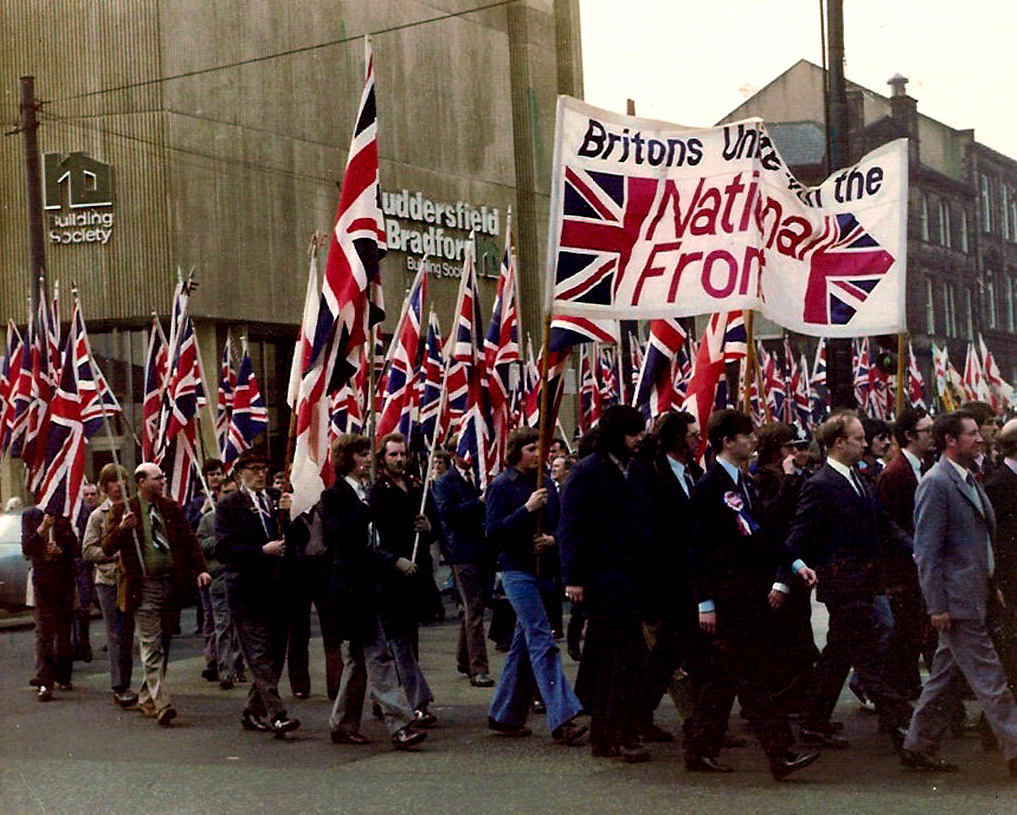
National Front demonstration in Yorkshire, 1970s

- The Union Movement, a re-founded version of the BUF that played a pivotal role in developing the Europeanist outlook of neo-fascism through its Europe a Nation campaign.
- The British National Party (1960–1967), which until a split in 1962 produced pro-Nazi propaganda. (This is a different party from the current BNP, although John Tyndall was a leading member of both)
- The National Socialist Movement, a Colin Jordan-led breakaway from the BNP that was openly Nazi and was a charter member of the World Union of National Socialists and active until 1968.
- The Greater Britain Movement, set up by John Tyndall when he split from the NSM, has been characterised as endorsing a specifically British form of Nazism.
- The British Movement, a 1968 development form the NSM, which used images of Hitler and the swastika on election literature.
- The November 9th Society, a neo-Nazi organisation founded by Terry Flynn in 1977. It also organises under the name British First Party.
- British National Party (1982–present) a fascist political party. At its peak in 2009 it had two Members of the European Parliament (MEPs) and 55 local councillors. It lost both of its MEPs by the time of the 2014 European Parliament election (one left the party prior to the election in October 2012) and lost its only remaining local councillor in the 2018 UK local elections.
- Britain First is a far-right, anti-Islam and ultranationalist party and hate group that has been described as fascist and neo-fascist by multiple media outlets.
- The National Socialist Action Party, a minor splinter group from the BM formed in 1982 and only active in the 1980s.
- National Action, a banned neo-Nazi terrorist organization that has done political activism.
- New British Union, an openly fascist group founded in January 2013 by Gary Raikes, a former British National Party candidate for Scotland.
- The British Democratic Party, also known as the British Democrats, is a fascist party formed in 2013.
- The Homeland Party, a minor fascist splinter party from Patriotic Alternative, formed in May 2023 and registered as a party in January 2024.
- The National Rebirth Party, founded in 2024, is an ethnonationalist, authoritarian party.

== Bibliography ==
- R. Benewick, Political Violence and Public Order, London: Allan Lane, 1969
- G. Bowd, Fascist Scotland – Caledonia and the Far Right, Edinburgh: Birlinn, 2013
- M. Cronin (ed.), The Failure of British Fascism, Basingstoke: Macmillan, 1996
- S. Dorrill, Blackshirt – Sir Oswald Mosley and British Fascism, London: Penguin, 2007
- R. Eatwell, Fascism : A History, London: Pimlico, 2003
- N. Goodrick-Clarke, Black Sun: Aryan Cults, Esoteric Nazism, and the Politics of Identity, New York: New York University Press, 2003
- R. Hill & A. Bell, The Other Face of Terror – Inside Europe’s Neo-Nazi Network, London: Collins, 1988
- K. Hodgson, Fighting Fascism: the British Left and the Rise of Fascism, 1919–39, Manchester University Press, 2010
- T. Linehan, British Fascism 1918–39: Parties, Ideology and Culture, Manchester University Press, 2000
- Graham Macklin, ‘Failed Führers: A History of Britain’s Extreme Right’, Routledge, 2020.
- M. Pugh, 'Hurrah for the Blackshirts!' Fascists and Fascism in Britain between the Wars, London, 2005
- R. Thurlow, Fascism in Britain, London: IB Tauris, 1998
- M. Walker, The National Front, Glasgow: Fontana, 1977

== Sources ==
- Wood, C.; Finlay, W. M. L. (2008). "British National Party Representations of Muslims in the Month after the London Bombings: Homogeneity, Threat, and the Conspiracy Tradition". British Journal of Social Psychology. 47 (4): 707–726. doi:10.1348/014466607X264103. PMID 18070375.
