= John Dimmer =

English recipient of the Victoria Cross

John Henry Stephen Dimmer
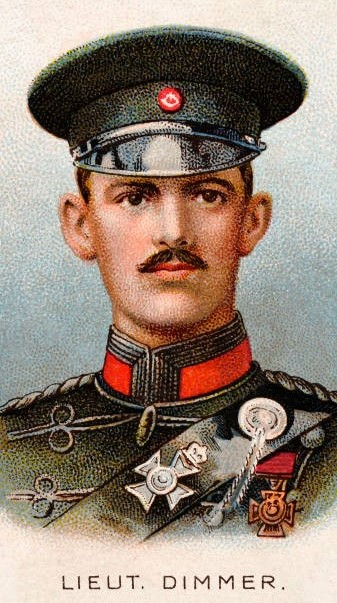
- Dimmer on a cigarette card
- Born: 9 October 1883; Lambeth, Surrey, England
- Died: 21 March 1918 (aged 34); Marteville, France
- Burial place: Vadencourt British Cemetery, Maissemy
- Military career
- Allegiance: United Kingdom
- Branch: British Army
- Service years: 1902 – 1918
- Rank: Lieutenant Colonel
- Units: King's Royal Rifle Corps
- Conflicts: World War I
- Awards: Victoria Cross; Military Cross; Mentioned in despatches

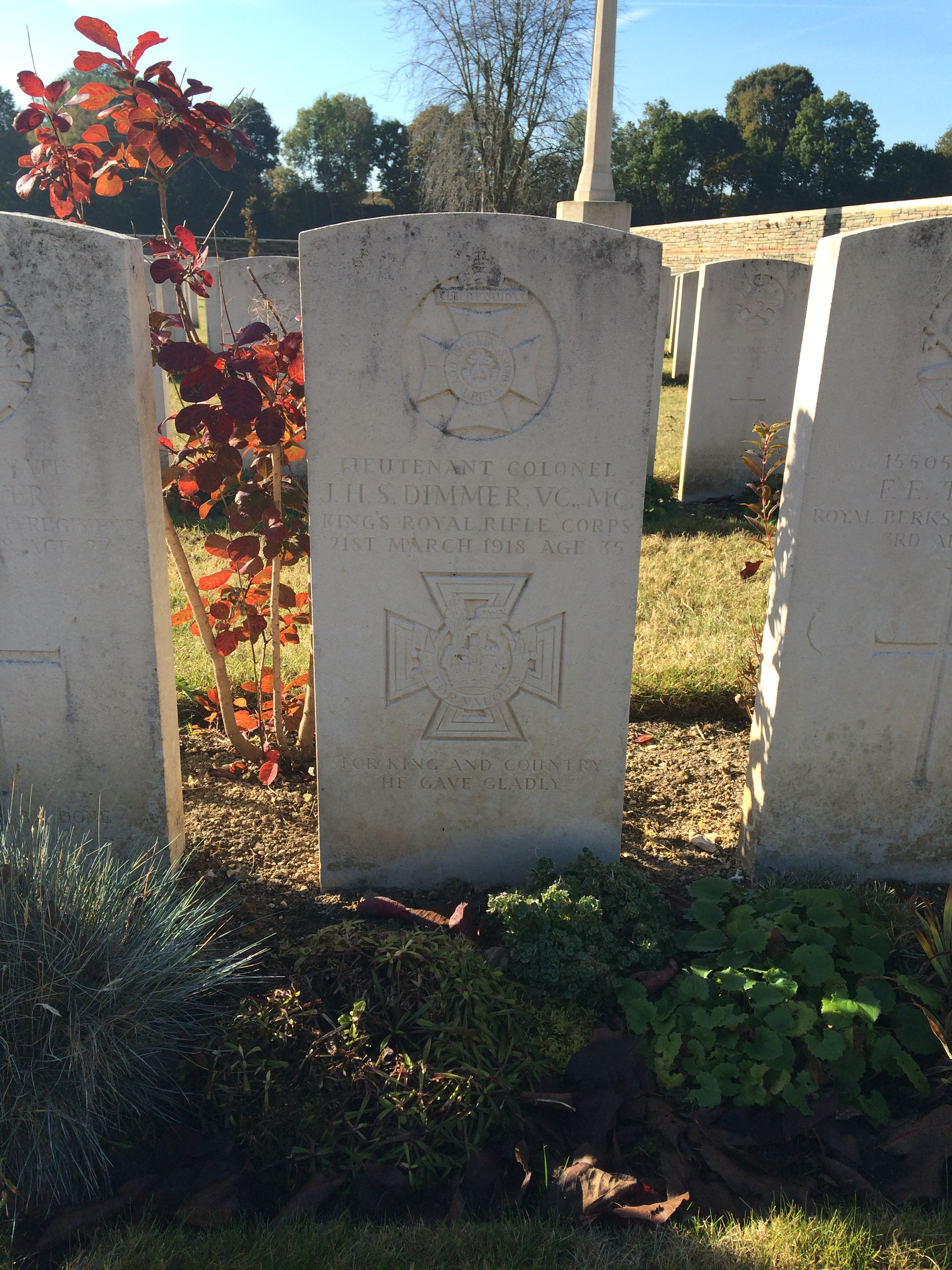
Grave of John Dimmer

Lieutenant Colonel John Henry Stephen Dimmer VC MC (9 October 1883 – 21 March 1918) was an English recipient of the Victoria Cross, the highest and most prestigious award for gallantry in the face of the enemy that can be awarded to British and Commonwealth forces.

== Life ==
Born on 9 October 1883 in Lambeth, his family moved to Wimbledon where Dimmer was educated at Rutlish School, Merton Park. In July 1902 he enlisted into the King's Royal Rifle Corps (KRRC), and was soon promoted to Corporal, then to Lance Sergeant. In 1906 he passed an officer's examination and was commissioned second lieutenant in the KRRC. Lack of financial backing meant he could not afford to serve with the regiment, and in 1908 he was attached to the West Africa Regiment as a local Lieutenant.

Dimmer was on home leave when the First World War broke out, and he went to France with the 2nd KRRC in August 1914.

=== Citation ===
A 31 year old lieutenant in the 2nd Battalion, The King's Royal Rifle Corps, Dimmer was awarded the VC for his actions on 12 November 1914 at Klein Zillebeke, Belgium.

This Officer served his machine gun during the attack on the 12 November at Klein Zillebeke until he had been shot five times – three times by shrapnel and twice by bullets, and continued at his post until his gun was destroyed

— The London Gazette, 19 November 1914

Dimmer was also mentioned in dispatches in October 1914, and was one of the first recipients of the Military Cross, in January 1915.

=== Later war service ===
After recovering from his wounds, Dimmer served as a brigade major from January 1915, and in April 1915 was promoted captain. After service in Salonika, Greece, he was seconded to the Machine Gun Corps from May to November 1916. He was promoted to temporary Lieutenant Colonel in January 1918, and was killed in action at Marteville, France on 21 March 1918 while commanding the 2nd/4th battalion of the Royal Berkshire Regiment. His body was missing until 1920, when it was buried at Vadencourt British Cemetery in Maissemy.

=== Marriage ===
On 19 January 1918, two months before his death, Dimmer married Gladys Dora May Parker in the Moseley Parish Church. The couple had no children. After Dimmer's death, his wife remarried to Leopold Canning, a Royal Flying Corps lieutenant and future president of the British Fascisti.

== Awards ==
- Victoria Cross
- Military Cross

Dimmer's Victoria Cross and other medals are displayed at the Royal Green Jackets (Rifles) Museum, Winchester, England.

== Bibliography ==
- Monuments to Courage (David Harvey, 1999)
- The Register of the Victoria Cross (This England, 1997)
- VCs of the First World War - 1914 (Gerald Gliddon, 1994)
