= Baron Garvagh =

Title in the Peerage of Ireland

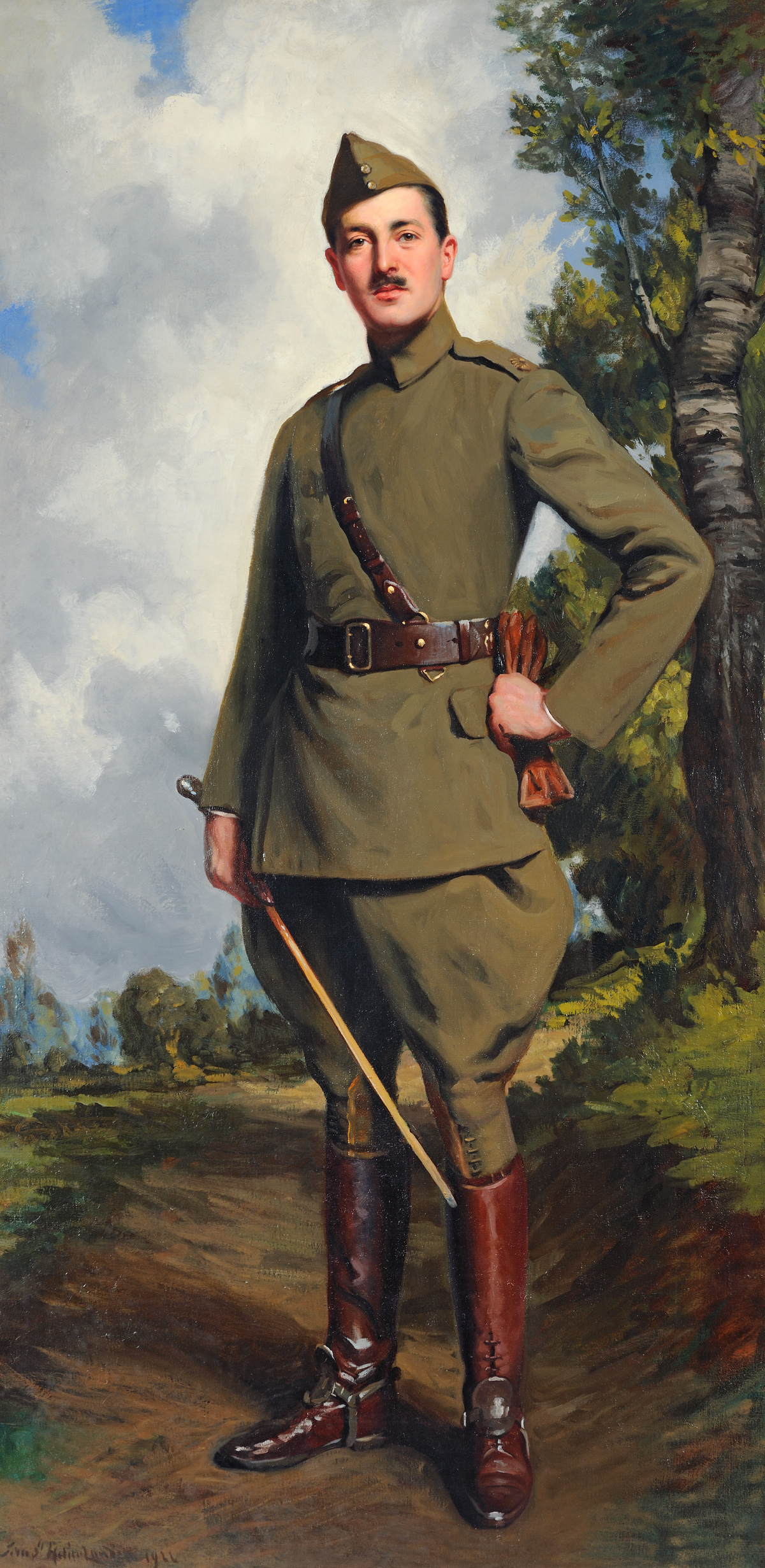
A 1922 portrait of the 4th Baron, Leopold Canning, by John St Helier Lander

Baron Garvagh, of Garvagh in the County Londonderry, is a title in the Peerage of Ireland. It was created in 1818 for George Canning. He had previously represented Sligo and Petersfield in Parliament and also served as Lord Lieutenant of County Londonderry. Canning was the first cousin of both Prime Minister George Canning and the diplomat Stratford Canning, 1st Viscount Stratford de Redcliffe. The title is currently held by his great-great-great-grandson, the sixth Baron, who succeeded his father in 2013.

The family seat was Garvagh House, near Garvagh, County Londonderry.

== Barons Garvagh (1818) ==
- George Canning, 1st Baron Garvagh (1778–1840)
- Charles Henry Spencer George Canning, 2nd Baron Garvagh (1826–1871)
- Charles John Spencer George Canning, 3rd Baron Garvagh (1852–1915)
- Leopold Ernest Stratford George Canning, 4th Baron Garvagh (1878–1956)
- (Alexander Leopold Ivor) George Canning, 5th Baron Garvagh (1920–2013)
- Spencer George Stratford de Redcliffe Canning, 6th Baron Garvagh (b. 1953)

The heir apparent and sole heir to the peerage is the present holder's son, the Hon. Stratford George Edward de Redcliffe Canning (born 1990).

== Coat of arms ==
Coat of arms of Baron Garvagh
Arms of the Earl of Gosford	Crest 1st: a Demi Lion rampant Argent charged with three Trefoils Vert holding in the dexter paw an Arrow pheoned and flighted proper shafted Or; 2nd: a Demi Lion rampant Ermine holding in the dexter paw a Battle-Axe proper; 3rd: a Demi Griffin segreant Sable beaked and legged Or. Helm A Baron's Coronet. Escutcheon Quarterly of six: 1st and 6th, Argent three Moors' Heads couped in profile proper wreathed round the temples Argent and Azure (Canning); 2nd, Gules three Spear Heads palewise in fess Argent (Salmon); 3rd, Gules a Goat salient Or (Marshall); 4th, Argent three Bendlets Azure within a Bordure Gules (Newburg); 5th, Per pale Argent and Sable a Fess nebuly between three Griffins' Heads erased all counterchanged and within a Bordure engrailed also counterchanged of the field (Spencer). Supporters Dexter: a Griffin reguardant wings elevated and expanded Azure guttée d'Or beaked and legged of the last; Sinister: an Eagle reguardant wings elevated and expanded Sable beaked and legged Or. Motto NE CEDE MALIS SED CONTRA; Yield not to misfortunes, but oppose them

== See also ==
- Earl Canning
- Viscount Stratford de Redcliffe

== Sources ==
- Hesilrige, Arthur G. M. (1921). Debrett's Peerage and Titles of courtesy. London: Dean & Son. p. 396.
- Kidd, Charles & Williamson, David (editors). Debrett's Peerage and Baronetage (1990 edition). New York: St Martin's Press, 1990,
- Leigh Rayment's Peerage Pages
