= Harold Elsdale Goad =

British writer

Harold Elsdale Goad (4 October 1878 – 26 May 1956) was a British writer, journalist and poet. He was an early sympathiser with fascism, publishing the pamphlet What is Fascism?, followed by two books on corporatism.

He was one of those in the British Fascists interested in Fascist ideology, with James Strachey Barnes, in relation to trade unions and guilds. The books were highly regarded by the Italian Fascist government. A small group, briefly attached to Chatham House, studied the Corporate State and included Goad, Barnes, Charles Petrie and Goad's co-author Muriel Currey; Goad addressed a Chatham House meeting in October 1933.

He was Director of the British Institute of Florence from 1922 to 1939.

== Works ==
- Goad, Harold E. (1903), The Blind Prophet - poem
- ——— (1913). The Kingdom. Frederick A. Stokes co.
- ——— (1926). Franciscan Italy.
- ——— (1929). What is Fascism? An Explanation of Its Essential Principles.
- ——— (1932). The Making of the Corporate State: A Study of Fascist Development.
- ———; Burkitt, Francis C.; Little, A. G. (1932). Franciscan Essays II. British Society of Franciscan Studies, Extra series. Manchester, UK: The University Press. OCLC 1096531998.
- ———; Currey, Muriel (1933). The Working of a Corporate State: A Study of National Co-operation.
- ——— (1939). History of the British Institute of Florence.
- ———; Catalano, Michele (1939). Education in Italy.
- ——— (1947). Greyfriars: the story of St. Francis and his followers.
- ——— (1951). A Franciscan Garland.
- ——— (1958). Language In History.
