= Leopold Ernest Stratford George Canning, 4th Baron Garvagh =

British nobleman, fascist and motor enthusiast

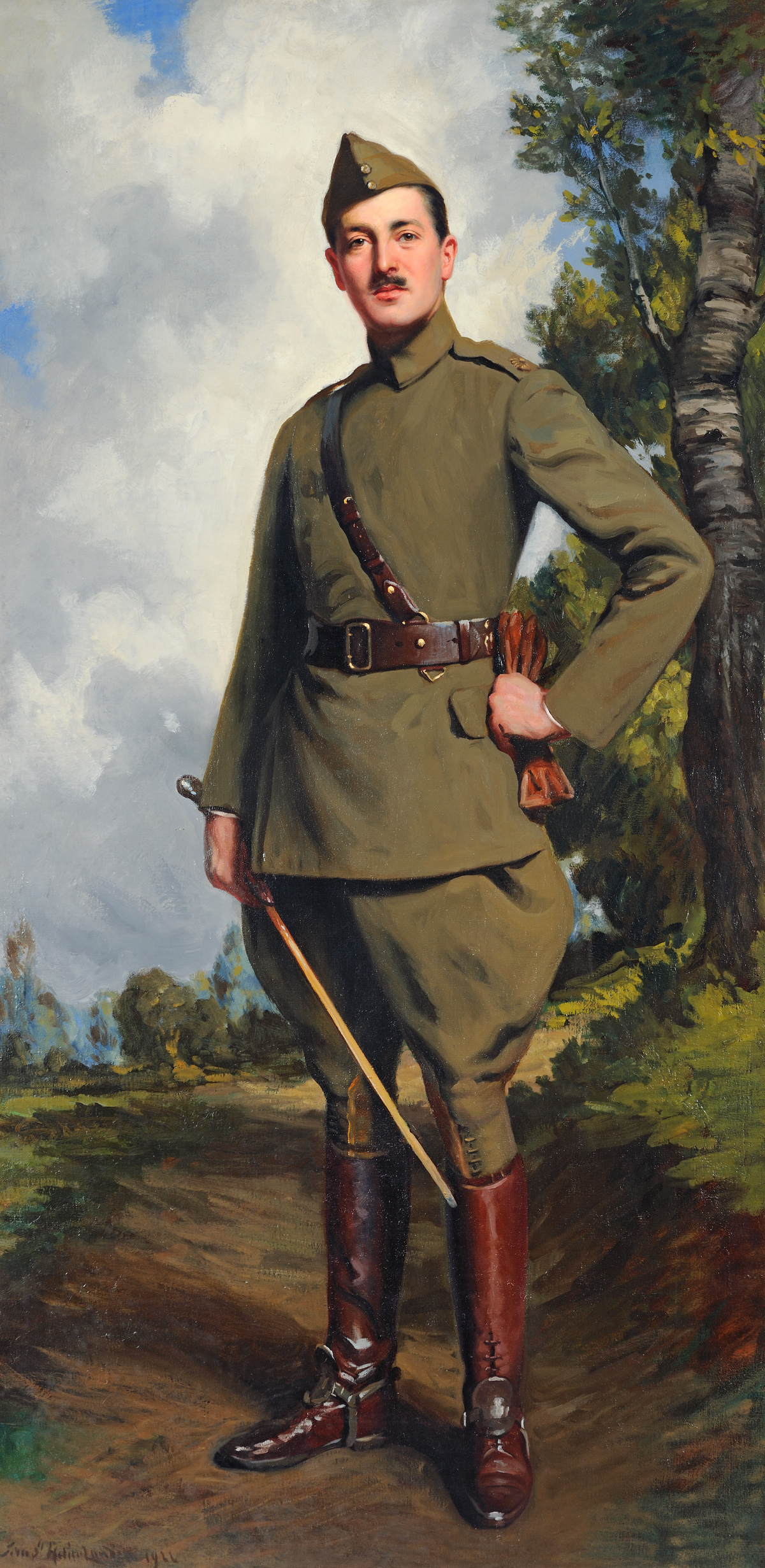
John St Helier Lander's 1922 portrait of Leopold Canning

Leopold Ernest Stratford George Canning, 4th Baron Garvagh JP DL (Note: Both the offices of Justice of the Peace and Deputy lieutenant were in County Londonderry.) (21 July 1878 – 16 July 1956) was a British nobleman, motorist, fighter pilot and politician, being the co-founder of the British Fascisti alongside Rotha Lintorn-Orman in 1923.

== Biography ==
Canning was among the first motorists in Ireland – he imported a six hp Panhard to Ireland from France in 1898. Later he participated in several auto races using motor-powered tricycles. He was also among the founders of the Motor Cycle Union of Ireland and the Irish Automobile Club. Motoring Annual and Motorist’s Year Book 1904 records him owning four Ormonde motorcycles and having high hopes about the future of motor industry in Britain.

Canning became a lieutenant in the 2nd Battalion of the Highland Light Infantry and participated in the First World War. He later transferred to the Royal Flying Corps, having also been a founder member of the Aéro-Club de France. He reached the rank of lieutenant in the Royal Flying Corps as well, serving on the Salonica front.

On 8 January 1915 Canning's father died, and he succeeded him as Baron Garvagh.

In 1923, Canning co-founded the British Fascisti with Rotha Lintorn-Orman. Historian Robert Skidelsky characterized the British Fascisti as

extreme right-wing group with a disproportionate number of generals and admirals, and dedicated to unrelenting struggle against the power of evil represented by bolshevism

— Robert Skidelsky, Oswald Mosley (1975)

Members of the new party, later known as British Fascists, included generals Ormonde Winter, Julian Tyndale-Biscoe, Roland Erskine-Tulloch, James Spens and Thomas Pilcher; admirals Edmund Fremantle, Reginald Tupper and William Ernest Russell Martin; Lieutenant Colonels Daniel Burges VC DSO and Edward Russell, as well as senior diplomat Arthur Henry Hardinge.

Flag of the British Fascists

Canning was replaced as President of the British Fascists by Brigadier R. B. D. Blakeney DSO in 1924, as he claimed to live too far away from London to be effective as a leader.

In 1928 Canning became one of the first members of the Fellowship of Nineteenth Century Motorists.

Canning died on 16 July 1956 at the age of 77, and his title of Baron Garvagh passed on to his only surviving son Alexander Leopold Ivor George.

== Family ==
Arms of Baron Garvagh

Canning was the great-grandson of George Canning, 1st Baron Garvagh, who was a first cousin of the short-time Prime Minister of the United Kingdom George Canning. His parents were Charles John Spencer George Canning and Florence Alice de Bretton.

Canning married for the first time in 1904 to Caroline Grace Elizabeth Rube, daughter of Charles Ernest Rube. The marriage was annulled in 1909 due to it not being consummated.

On 1 January 1919, Canning married for a second time to Gladys Dora May Dimmer (née Parker, 1895–1982) in St Matthew's, Bayswater. She was a widow of John Dimmer VC MC, who had been killed in action on 21 March 1918 in France. The couple had four children:

- Dora Valerie Patricia Canning (31 October 1919 – 17 May 2002), married Philip Anthony Wellesley-Clark, who was killed in action in the Normandy landings on 6 June 1944
- Alexander Leopold Ivor George Canning, 5th Baron Garvagh, (6 October 1920 – 31 October 2013)
- Daphne Rose Canning (born 16 December 1922)
- Lieutenant Victor Stratford de Redcliffe Canning (7 February 1924 – 7 May 1944), killed in action in Cassino, Italy

Lady Garvagh continued to live at Lyzzick Gate in Millbeck near Keswick, where she died on 27 January 1982.

== Footnotes ==
Peerage of the United Kingdom
Preceded by Charles John Spencer George Canning	Baron Garvagh; 1915–1956	Succeeded by George Canning
