= James Strachey Barnes =

James Strachey Barnes (1890–1955) was a theorist of British fascism.

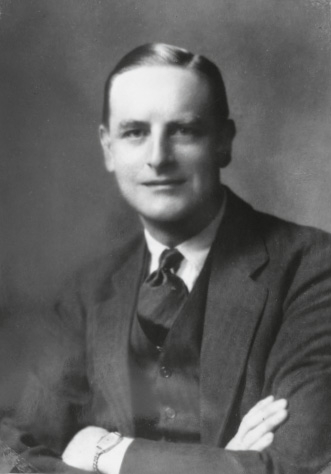
Photo of James Strachey Barnes.

== Life ==
He was born in India, the son of Hugh Shakespear Barnes and his wife Winifred Strachey, daughter of Sir John Strachey. Brought up in Florence by his Strachey grandparents, he was educated at St Aubyns School, Eton College and King's College, Cambridge. He became a Roman Catholic convert in 1914.

Barnes served in the Guards and Royal Flying Corps during World War I. He then worked in the Foreign Office Intelligence Department until 1919. Subsequently, he lived in Italy, disliking British life as he found it. He was a member of the Partito Nazionale Fascista, and a friend of Benito Mussolini.

Barnes became the leader of the Centre International des Études Fascistes (CINEF) in Lausanne, Switzerland. Other British founders were Edmund Garratt Gardner and Walter Starkie; George Clarke, 1st Baron Sydenham of Combe and Arnold Leese were members. Strachey's The Universal Aspects of Fascism was published in CINEF's journal, along with articles by Edmundo Rossoni, Augusto Turati and Gioacchino Volpe. Barnes became foreign editor of the periodical Social Justice.

His 1928 book The Universal Aspect of Fascism received some attention both in Italy and in Europe. Mussolini wrote the second edition's preface.

During World War II Barnes worked to publicise Fascist Italy. His own Fascist views included palingenesis, anti-Semitism, and opposition to liberalism. After the war he lived in Italy. On the idea of Fascism, he described:

Fascism may be defined generally as a political and social movement having as its objective the re-establishment of a political and social order, based upon the main current of traditions that have formed our European civilisation, traditions created by Rome, first by the Empire and subsequently by the Catholic Church.
