= Militant Christian Patriots =

British anti-Semitic organisation

The Militant Christian Patriots (MCP) were a short-lived but influential antisemitic organisation active in the United Kingdom immediately prior to the Second World War. It played a central role in the ultimately unsuccessful attempts to keep the UK out of any European war.

== Formation ==
The formation of the MCP has been disputed by historians. According to G.C. Webber the group was set up in 1928 by Lieutenant-Colonel Arthur H. Lane, who had previously been prominent in the Britons. In contrast Hilary Blume sets its formation date as September 1935, and claims that it was established by Miss M.I. Nutt MacKenzie. Barberis, McHugh and Tyldesley give its formation date as 1938, claiming it emerged soon after the Munich crisis. Robert Benewick, writing in 1969, placed the group's formation as late as 1939. Subsequently published information makes this date unlikely however.

== Development and ideology ==
Upon its formation its avowed aim was opposing Zionism. Soon however the group announced its support for Adolf Hitler and they quickly established links with Nazi Germany. They agitated widely in favour of appeasement, and targeted Neville Chamberlain in an attempt to convince him to keep out of what they portrayed as a war desired by the Jews. Publicly they emphasised their Christian identity and claimed to wish to introduce "militant Christianity" into all areas of British life. To this end they identified several opponents beyond the Jews whom they saw as endangering Christian Britain, including the League of Nations, occultism, psychoanalysis and the political Left in general, with particular emphasis on the Fabian Society and Political and Economic Planning. It campaigned widely in support of the Nationalists during the Spanish Civil War, presenting it as a battle between Christian forces and the Antichrist.

The group began publishing its own news organ, Free Press, in 1935 with vendors selling it in the streets, with a second journal, The Britisher, following in 1937. They were noted for their extensive publishing efforts. A number of prominent activists on the far right held membership of the group or were close to it, including A. K. Chesterton, Cuthbert Reavely and Joseph Bannister, with William Joyce also having a brief association with the group. The MCP favoured conspiratorial antisemitism, claiming that both Bolshevism and international finance were controlled by the Jews as part of a conspiracy to take over the world.

Such were the connections to the Germans that by the spring of 1939 the Secretary of the Defence Committee stated that the group had taken over as the main outlet for dissemination of Nazi propaganda in the UK. This was corroborated by the Board of Deputies of British Jews. However following the signing of the Hitler–Stalin pact the group, which was also strongly anti-communist, lost its enthusiasm for the Nazis.

== Relationship to other groups ==
The group had a reasonably good relationship with the British Union of Fascists, the main fascist organisation in the UK and one that frequently had a fractious relationship with other actors on the far-right, and MCP material was on sale in the BUF bookshop in Canterbury. It became close to the Nordic League and the two groups worked together in attempting to influence members of the government away from involvement in any action against Germany. The group also worked closely with the National Citizens Union, an originally anti-socialist group that had moved increasingly to antisemitism during the 1930s.

Richard Stokes, the Labour MP for Ipswich was a member of the group.

The MCP affiliated to the Coordinating Committee, an umbrella group established by Archibald Maule Ramsay that also included the British Democratic Party, the National Citizens Union and the British Empire Union. This group proved short-lived however as the differences between the member groups led to its collapse.

The fate of the MCP is unclear although it continued to exist after the outbreak of war, its publications appearing until April 1940. However the group was not revived after the war.
