= British Fascists =

British fascist political party

- Leader: Rotha Lintorn-Orman; Leopold Canning; R. B. D. Blakeney; William Joyce
- Founder: Rotha Lintorn-Orman
- Founded: 6 May 1923
- Dissolved: 1934
- Merged into: British Union of Fascists (majority)
- Membership (1926): 200,000 (claimed)
- Ideology: British fascism; Ultra-royalism; National conservatism; Anti-socialism
- Political position: Far-right

Party flag

The British Fascists (originally called the British Fascisti) were the first political organisation in the United Kingdom to claim the label of fascism, formed in 1923. The group had lacked much ideological unity apart from anti-socialism for most of its existence, and was strongly associated with British conservatism. William Joyce, Neil Francis Hawkins, Maxwell Knight, Arthur Gilligan and Arnold Leese were amongst those to have passed through the movement as members and activists.

== Structure and membership ==
A flowchart showing the history of the early British fascist movement

The organisation was formed on 6 May 1923 by Rotha Lintorn-Orman in the aftermath of Benito Mussolini's March on Rome, and originally operated under the Italian-sounding name British Fascisti. Despite its name, the group had a poorly defined ideological basis at its beginning, being brought into being more by a fear of left-wing politics than a devotion to fascism. The ideals of the Boy Scout movement, with which many early members had also been involved in their younger days, also played a role, for the British Fascisti wished, according to General R. B. D. Blakeney, who was the BF President from 1924 to 1926, to "uphold the same lofty ideas of brotherhood, service and duty". At its formation, at least, the British Fascisti was positioned in the same right-wing conservative camp as the British Empire Union and the Middle Class Union, and shared some members with these groups. The group had a complex structure, being presided over by both an Executive Council and Fascist Grand Council of nine men, with County and Area Commanders controlling districts below this. Districts contained a number of companies, which in turn were divided into troops with each troop made of three units and unit containing seven members under a Leader. A separate structure existed along similar lines for the group's sizeable female membership. The group became notorious for its inflated claims of membership (including the claim that it had 200,000 members in 1926), although at its peak from 1925 to 1926 it had a membership of several thousand. It mustered 5,000 people for a London march on Empire Day in London in 1925.

Early membership largely came from high society, often from the "Die Hards" in the Conservative party, and included a number of women amongst its ranks, such as Dorothy, Viscountess Downe, Lady Sydenham of Combe, Baroness Zouche and Nesta Webster. Men from the aristocracy also joined, including Lord Glasgow, The Marquess of Ailesbury, Lord Ernest Hamilton, The Baron de Clifford, The Earl Temple of Stowe, Sir Arthur Henry Hardinge and Leopold Canning, Lord Garvagh, who served as first President of the movement. High-ranking members of the armed forces also occupied leading roles in the group, with General Blakeney joined by the likes of General Sir Ormonde Winter, Rear-Admiral John Armstrong (the BF Vice President 1924–1926) and Colonel Sir Charles Rosdew Burn, who combined a role on the Grand Council of the British Fascisti with that of Conservative Party MP for Torquay. Admirals Sir Edmund Fremantle and Sir Reginald Tupper, Brigadier-Generals Julian Tyndale-Biscoe and Roland Erskine-Tulloch, Rear Admiral William Ernest Russell Martin (BF's paymaster), Major-Generals James Spens, Thomas Pilcher and Colonel Daniel Burges were also members. Serving military personnel were eventually banned from joining the group by the Army Council, however.

At a more rank-and-file level, the group attracted a membership of middle- and working-class young men who spent much of their time in violent confrontations with similar men involved in the Communist Party of Great Britain; William Joyce was typical of this sort of low-level member. This domination by disgruntled members of the peerage and high-ranking officers meant that certain concerns not normally associated with the demands of fascism, such as anger at the decline of the large landowning agricultural sector, high levels of estate taxation and death duties, and the dearth of high-ranking civilian occupations considered suitable for the status of officers, were a central feature of the political concerns advanced by the British Fascisti.

== Early development ==
The party confined itself to stewarding Conservative Party meetings and canvassing for the party. In particular it campaigned vigorously on behalf of Oliver Locker-Lampson, whose "Keep Out the Reds" campaign slogan struck a chord with the group's strong anti-communism. The group also indulged in a series of high-profile stunts, many of which were more in the vein of elaborate practical jokes than genuine subversion. In one such example, five British Fascisti forcibly removed Harry Pollitt from a train to Liverpool, where he was due to address a National Minority Movement event, and attempted to bundle him on to a different train. The five members arrested for the event insisted that they had intended to send Pollitt on a weekend break and even claimed that he had taken £5 in expenses they offered him for that purpose.

The group changed its name in 1924 from British Fascisti to British Fascists, in an attempt to distance itself from the Italian associations, although this move helped to bring about a split in the group with a more ideologically fascist group, the National Fascisti, going its own way. The group's patriotism had been questioned because of the Italian spelling of the name, while accusations were also made that it was in the pay of the Italian government. Placing emphasis on its support for the establishment, it even wrote to Labour Party Home Secretary Arthur Henderson in 1924 telling him that the group was at his disposal if he wished to deploy them against picket lines during industrial unrest, an offer to which Henderson did not respond. Blakeney had replaced Canning as President that same year, with Canning claiming that he lived too far from London to be politically influential enough. London was the group's major base of operation. In December 1925 an attempt to organise a meeting in Manchester was broken up by communists, and the BF abandoned its attempts to set up in the city as a result.

Despite its close association with elements of the Conservative Party, the British Fascists did occasionally put up candidates in local elections. In 1924 two of its candidates in the municipal elections in Stamford, Lincolnshire, Arnold Leese and Henry Simpson, managed to secure election to the local council. Simpson would retain his seat in 1927 although by that stage both he and Leese had broken from the British Fascists.

In 1925 members of the Liverpool branch of the British Fascists were arrested and charged with kidnapping the communist politician Harry Pollitt. They were acquitted by the jury following testimony that characterised the kidnapping as unserious, and a denial by the head of the Liverpool branch that any kidnapping had been authorised.

== General Strike ==
The British Fascists began to take on a more prominent role in the run-up to the General Strike of 1926, as it became clear that their propaganda predicting such an outcome was about to come true. They were, however, not permitted to join the Organisation for the Maintenance of Supplies (OMS), a group established by the government and chaired by Lord Hardinge to mobilise a non-striking workforce in the event of general strike, without first relinquishing any explicit attachment to fascism, as the government insisted for the group to remain non-ideological. The structure of the OMS was actually based on that of the British Fascists, but the government was unwilling to rely on the British Fascists because of what they saw as the group's unorthodox nature and its reliance on funding from Rotha Lintorn-Orman (who had garnered a reputation for high living) and so excluded it as a group from the OMS. As a result, a further split occurred, as a number of members, calling themselves Loyalists and led by former BF President Brigadier-General Blakeney, did just that. In the event, the British Fascists formed their own Q Divisions, which took on much of the same work as the OMS during the strike, albeit without having any official government recognition.

The strike severely damaged the party as it failed to precipitate the "Bolshevik Revolution", which Lintorn-Orman had set the party up to fight. In fact, the strike was largely peaceful and restrained, and fears of future outbreaks were quelled somewhat by the passing of the Trades Disputes Act. Many of its most prominent members and supporters also drifted away from the group in the aftermath of the strike. The party journal, initially called Fascist Bulletin before changing its name to British Lion, went from a weekly to a monthly, and the loss of a number of key leaders and the erratic leadership of Lintorn-Orman, who was battling alcoholism, brought about a decline of activity. The group also became ravaged by factionalism, with one group following Lady Downe and the old ways of the British Fascists, and another centred around James Strachey Barnes and Sir Harold Elsdale Goad advocating full commitment to a proper fascist ideology.

== Decline ==
Having been hit hard by the split from the General Strike, the British Fascists attempted to move gradually towards a more defined fascism, starting in 1927 by adopting a blue shirt and beret uniform in the style of similar movements in Europe. That same year they attempted to organise a Remembrance Day parade past Buckingham Palace where they requested the King should salute them from the balcony but the requests were rejected and the parade did not take place. The progress towards fascism did not however come quickly enough for Arnold Leese who in 1928 split from the group, which he denounced as "conservatism with knobs on", to establish his own Imperial Fascist League (IFL), a much more hard-line group which emphasised anti-Semitism. Before long, however, the British Fascists began to advocate a more authoritarian government in which the monarch would take a leading role in government, as well as advocating the establishment of a Benito Mussolini-style corporate state. These policy changes were made possible by the departure of Blakeney, who was committed to representative democracy and whose main economic opinion was opposition to the gold standard. Even without Blakeney they retained some of their earlier Conservative-linked views, such as loyalty to the king, anti-trade union legislation, free trade within the British Empire and a general preference for the rural, although these were bolstered by fascist-influenced policies such as limiting the franchise, gradual purification of the "English race" and stringent restrictions on immigration and the activities of immigrants admitted to Britain. However, as Martin Pugh has pointed out the British Fascists actively encouraged comparisons with the Conservative Party, feeling that it would add a sense of legitimacy and Britishness to their activities, particularly as they faced harsh criticism from not only the left but also some Tories for their increasingly paramilitary structure. Nonetheless some Tories were close to the group, with Charles Burn sitting on the Grand Council and support being lent by the likes of Patrick Hannon, Robert Tatton Bower, Robert Burton-Chadwick and Alan Lennox-Boyd. Indeed, in May 1925 Hannon even booked a room in the House of Commons to host an event for the British Fascists.

After 1931 the BF abandoned its attempts to form a distinctly British version of Fascism, and instead adopted the full programme of Mussolini and his National Fascist Party. The already weakened group split further in 1932 over the issue of a merger with Oswald Mosley's New Party. The proposal was accepted by Neil Francis Hawkins of the Headquarters Committee and his allies Lieutenant-Colonel H. W. Johnson and E. G. Mandeville Roe, although the female leadership turned the proposal down due to objections over serving under Mosley. Indeed, the British Fascists had protested against public meetings being addressed by Mosley as early as 1927, when they denounced the then Labour MP as a dangerous socialist. As a consequence Hawkins broke away and took much of the male membership of the BF with him; soon afterward, the New Party became the British Union of Fascists (BUF). Relations with the BUF were as a result frosty for the remainder of the group's life, and although Mosley dismissed the BF as "three old ladies and a couple of office boys", in 1933 a BUF fighting squad wrecked the BF's London offices after British Fascists members had heckled the BUF headquarters.

By this stage the BF membership had plummeted, with only a hardcore of members left. Various schemes were floated in an attempt to reinvigorate the movement, although none succeeded. Archibald Whitmore announced a plan to turn the British Fascists into an Ulster loyalist group and successor to the Ulster Volunteers, although after claiming that he was preparing to begin recruitment in Northern Ireland, nothing came of this. The scheme had been led by Mrs D. G. Harnett, a close friend of Lintorn-Orman, who hoped the BF could profit from the emergence of prominent Irish republican Éamon de Valera as President of the Executive Council of the Irish Free State but the plan was scuppered when the policies of the Irish Free State towards Northern Ireland largely remained the same under de Valera. A small group did exist in the Irish Free State, claiming to have a thousand members, although in fact having no more than 25 active in Dublin under H. R. Ledbeater. Favouring reunification with the UK, the group was involved in sending anti-Semitic leaflets to prominent Jews such as Robert Briscoe. It sought a merger with the right-wing Army Comrades Association, but this was rejected by Eoin O'Duffy due to its pro-British stance. Plans for a merger with the IFL did not get off the ground and plans for a merger with Graham Seton Hutchison's National Workers Party were also abandoned when it became clear that, far from having the 20,000 members in Mansfield alone that Seton Hutchison claimed, the party was little more than a one-man show.

In a bid to reverse its decline the party adopted a strongly anti-semitic platform. Thurlow notes: "it was noticeable that the BF became increasingly anti-semitic in its death throes." In 1933 Lord and Lady Downe, as representatives of the British Fascists, entertained Nazi German envoy Gunther Schmidt-Lorenzen at their country estate and suggested to him that the Nazis should avoid any links with Mosley, whom Lady Downe accused of being in the pay of Jewish figures such as Baron Rothschild and Sir Philip Sassoon. Fellow member Madame Arnaud repeated similar allegations about Mosley to another German official, Dr Margarete Gartner of the Economic Policy Association. However, by this stage Lintorn-Orman's mother had cut her off financially after hearing lurid tales of debauchery involving the female fascist leader, and so the group fell into debt until being declared bankrupt in 1934 when a Colonel Wilson called in a £500 loan. This effectively brought the British Fascists to a conclusion; Rotha Lintorn-Orman died the following year.

== See also ==
- List of British fascist parties
