= National Socialist League (United Kingdom) =

British Nazi political movement

- Abbreviation: NSL
- Founders: William Joyce; John Beckett; John Angus MacNab
- Founded: 1937
- Dissolved: 1939
- Split from: British Union of Fascists
- Newspaper: The Helmsman
- Ideology: Nazism
- Political position: Far-right
- Colours: Red White Blue
- Slogan: "Steer Straight"

The National Socialist League (NSL) was a short-lived Nazi political movement in the United Kingdom immediately prior to the Second World War.

== Formation ==
A flowchart showing the history of the early British fascist movement

The NSL was formed in 1937 by William Joyce, John Beckett and John Angus MacNab as a splinter group from the British Union of Fascists. The leaders claimed that the League had been formed because BUF leader Oswald Mosley was too much in thrall to continental fascism, although Mosley contended that the three had simply been sacked from their paid posts in the BUF as part of a cost-cutting exercise. Beckett and Joyce attacked Mosley as being more interested in personal glory than fascism, Beckett claiming that he himself and Joyce wanted no cult of personality, but rather were there only as "instruments of a great policy". The formation of the group was announced at 109 Vauxhall Bridge Road in south-west London.

Whatever the truth, the NSL began fairly healthily as Joyce secured the financial backing of Alexander Carron Scrimgeour, a stockbroker, and soon the NSL was able to publish its own newspaper, The Helmsman, adopting 'Steer Straight' as the party motto. The party's ideology was based on a document published by Joyce entitled National Socialism Now in which he declared his strong admiration for Adolf Hitler but added that what was needed was a specifically British Nazism. The Carlyle Club, a political and social discussion club modelled after the January Club and named for Thomas Carlyle, one of Joyce's favourite philosophers, was also established as an arm of the NSL.

== Development ==
Connections were quickly established with the Nordic League, an influential secret society chaired by Archibald Maule Ramsay. Rising far-right figure A. K. Chesterton went on, after leaving the BUF in 1938, to speak at a number of NSL functions and write for its publications. Anglo-German Fellowship member and Conservative MP Jocelyn Lucas also developed clandestine links with the NSL. However, the NSL also attracted as a founder member Vincent Collier, a propaganda officer in the BUF who also functioned as an agent for the Board of Deputies of British Jews.

In 1938, the NSL became associated with the British Council Against European Commitments, a coalition group chaired by Lord Lymington. Although Joyce quickly tired of this unusual mixture of high-society fascists and pacifists, Beckett was closer to their ideals, and before long he left the NSL to join the British People's Party. Beckett had also become less convinced of following the lead of Nazi Germany in the aftermath of the Munich crisis. Meanwhile, Scrimgeour died in 1937 and surprisingly left nothing to the NSL in his will; this resulted in the main source of funding being cut off. Alongside this, as was the case for most rival groups on the far right, the BUF Blackshirts saw the NSL as enemies and were known to attack their rallies and meetings.

== Decline ==
Joyce became embittered and increasingly turned to alcohol, while politically his vision of a British Nazism gave way to a more direct copy of German Nazism; Chesterton states that he started ending NSL meetings by shouting "Sieg Heil". By 1939 the NSL had been re-registered as a drinking club rather than a political party, and one of the group's final meetings in May 1939 ended in chaos as Joyce punched a heckler after the crowd had turned on him for his overtly pro-German speech. Joyce handed control of the NSL over to MacNab on 25 August, instructing him that it was his duty to dissolve the movement, which by that time had only 40 registered members. Apart from an index of members that MacNab secreted for possible later use, the League's documents were all destroyed at this meeting. Joyce departed for Germany just after this meeting, and the NSL was wound up.

Towards the end of the Second World War some NSL members regrouped in the Constitution Research Association under Major Harry Edmonds, although this initiative had no impact and quickly disappeared.

== See also ==
- List of British fascist parties
