= George Canning, 1st Baron Garvagh =

Anglo-Irish Member of Parliament

Arms of Baron Garvagh

George Canning, 1st Baron Garvagh FRS (15 November 1778 – 20 August 1840) was an Anglo-Irish Member of Parliament.

Garvagh was the son of Paul Canning and the grandson of Stratford Canning of Garvagh in County Londonderry. Prime Minister George Canning and the diplomat Stratford Canning, 1st Viscount Stratford de Redcliffe, were his first cousins. He was elected to the House of Commons for Sligo in 1806, a seat he held until 1812, and then represented Petersfield from 1812 to 1820. On 1 February 1810 he was elected a Fellow of the Royal Society and on 28 October 1818 he was raised to the Peerage of Ireland as Baron Garvagh, of Garvagh in the County of Londonderry. Lord Garvagh later served as Lord Lieutenant of County Londonderry between 1831 and 1840. He died while staying at a hotel in Châlons-sur-Marne (now renamed Châlons-en-Champagne) in August 1840, aged 61, and was succeeded in the barony by his son Charles Henry Spencer George Canning.

Parliament of the United Kingdom
Preceded by Owen Wynne	Member of Parliament for Sligo; 1806–1812	Succeeded by Joshua Spencer
Preceded by Hylton Jolliffe; George Canning	Member of Parliament for Petersfield; 1812–1820; With: Hylton Jolliffe	Succeeded by Hylton Jolliffe; The Lord Hotham
Honorary titles
New title	Lord Lieutenant of County Londonderry; 1831–1840	Succeeded by Sir Robert Ferguson, Bt
Peerage of Ireland
New creation	Baron Garvagh; 1818–1840	Succeeded by Charles Canning
