= Nordic League =

British far right organisation

- Abbreviation: NL
- Leader: Archibald Maule Ramsay
- Founded: 1935; 91 years ago
- Dissolved: 1939; 87 years ago
- Ideology: Nazism
- Political position: Far-right
- International affiliation: Nordische Gesellschaft
- Slogan: "Perish Judah"

The Nordic League (NL) was a far-right organisation in the United Kingdom from 1935 to 1939 that sought to serve as a co-ordinating body for the various extremist movements whilst also seeking to promote Nazism. The League was a private organisation that did not organise any public events.

== Development ==
The Nordic League (NL) originated in 1935 when agents of Alfred Rosenberg's Nordische Gesellschaft arrived in Britain to establish a UK version of their movement. The main force behind this new group was Unionist MP Archibald Maule Ramsay who chaired the group's 14-man leadership council. The group's constitution described it as an "association of race conscious Britons" and sought to co-ordinate all far-right and fascist movements whilst giving particular emphasis to antisemitism.

The League sought to unite leading figures from across the far right, as demonstrated in April 1939 when a meeting addressed by Ramsay was chaired by a member of the British Union of Fascists who was supported by former British Fascists president R. B. D. Blakeney and Imperial Fascist League member E. H. Cole. Other leading members included J. F. C. Fuller, the United Empire Fascist Party leader and Nazi agent Serocold Skeels, Henry Hamilton Beamish, Arnold Leese and P. J. Ridout. The latter was credited with helping to popularise the NL's slogan "Perish Judah", which was frequently rendered "P.J." in public.

BUF leader Oswald Mosley, fearful of being too closely associated with the League's extremist rhetoric, did not join but he permitted party members to do so which the likes of Fuller, Robert Gordon-Canning and Oliver C. Gilbert did readily. As a result of these links the BUF was able to absorb the National Socialist Workers Party, a small group led by NL member Lieutenant-Colonel Graham Seton-Hutchison.

== Front groups ==
The NL was closely linked to the White Knights of Britain, a secret society otherwise known as the Hooded Men with ritual initiation based on Freemasonry and compared to the Ku Klux Klan that was active from 1935 to 1937. The White Knights and the NL shared the same building as their headquarters. Another group, the Militant Christian Patriots, that was active after the Munich Crisis urging Neville Chamberlain not to become involved in a "Jewish war", was also closely connected to the NL and said by MI5 to be a front organisation. By using this group and another front organisation, the Liberty Restoration League, the NL was able to ensure that high-ranking figures such as the Duke of Wellington, the Duchess of Hamilton, Baron Brocket, and Michael O'Dwyer became involved in their movement.

== Response and demise ==
The NL came under increasing scrutiny after Kristallnacht, particularly for the violence of Ramsay, William Joyce and A. K. Chesterton in their antisemitic speeches. Others such as Elwyn Wright, who until 1937 was secretary of the Anglo-German Fellowship, called for the shooting of Jews, whilst Commander E. H. Cole condemned the House of Commons as being full of "bastardised Jewish swine". However, such extremist language worked against the NL because its speakers were seen by the public at large as quite mad and so their pro-appeasement arguments were ignored.

Following the outbreak of the Second World War, two leading members, T. Victor-Rowe and Oliver Gilbert, were interned, and the NL largely went into abeyance, with members joining other, more public, anti-war groups. The League had officially disbanded as soon as war was declared although it continued to meet secretly at Gilbert's house until his arrest in late September 1939. Two of its members, Joyce and Margaret Bothamley, left Britain for Nazi Germany after the outbreak of war. Given the association of the NL with Nazism, BUF organiser Alexander Raven Thomson even suggested that Mosley publicly denounce the League as traitors in an attempt to present a more patriotic image, although Defence Regulation 18B came into force before this could be attempted.
