= Imperial Fascist League =

British fascist political movement

- Abbreviation: IFL
- Director-General: Arnold Leese
- Founded: 1928; 98 years ago
- Dissolved: 1939; 87 years ago
- Split from: British Fascists
- Membership: approx. 150–200
- Ideology: Fascism (UK)
- Political position: Far-right
- Religion: Protestantism
- Colours: Red White Blue; Black (customary)
- Slogan: "St George Our Guide!"

Party flag

The Imperial Fascist League (IFL) was a British fascist political movement founded by Arnold Leese in 1928 after he broke away from the British Fascists (BF). It included a blackshirted paramilitary arm called the Fascists Legion, modelled after the Italian Fascists. The group espoused antisemitism and the dominance of the 'Aryan race' in a 'Racial Fascist Corporate State', especially after Leese met Nazi Party propagandist Julius Streicher, the virulently racist publisher of Der Stürmer; the group later indirectly received funding from the Nazis. Although it had only between 150 and 500 members at maximum, its public profile was higher than its membership numbers would indicate.

After the IFL turned down a merger with the British Union of Fascists (BUF) in 1932, due to policy differences, the BUF mounted a campaign against the IFL, physically breaking up its meetings and fabricating fake plans that showed the IFL planning to attack the BUF's headquarters, which were passed on to the British government.

The Imperial Fascist League went into a steep decline upon the outbreak of World War II, after Leese declared his allegiance to "King and country", to the displeasure of pro-German members. Nevertheless, Leese was interned under wartime security regulations, and the IFL was not reformed after the war.

== Origins ==
Leese had originally been a member of the BF and indeed had been one of only two members ever to hold elected office for them (as a councillor in Stamford). However, he split from the BF around 1927 and decamped to London, where in 1928, he established both the IFL and its organ The Fascist. The Fascists Legions, a blackshirted paramilitary arm, was soon added under the command of Leslie H. Sherrard. The group initially advocated such policies as corporatism, monetary reform and the removal of citizenship from Jews. It had no more than 500 members and may have had as few as 150. The group was initially led by Brigadier-General Erskine Tulloch although real power lay with Leese, who was confirmed as Director-General in 1932. Henry Hamilton Beamish, the head of The Britons, served as vice-president of the IFL and was a regular speaker at the movement's events.

== Nazism ==
A flowchart showing the history of the early British fascist movement

The IFL soon shifted away from Italian fascism (it originally used the fasces as its emblem) after Leese had met the Nazi Party propagandist Julius Streicher in Germany. Soon, antisemitism became the central theme of IFL policy and its new programme, the 'Racial Fascist Corporate State', stressed the supremacy of the 'Aryan race'. The IFL altered its flag so that it featured the Union Flag superimposed with the swastika. As a result of that conversion, the IFL enjoyed a higher profile than its membership might suggest, in large part due to the funding that it received from Nazi Germany paid through the English correspondent for the Völkischer Beobachter, Dr. Hans Wilhelm Thost. Indeed, by the mid-1930s the IFL had turned against the Italian model so much that it denounced Benito Mussolini as a "pro-Semite" and claimed that the Second Italo-Ethiopian War had been organised by Jews.

== Arrival of the BUF ==
In 1932, Robert Forgan approached the IFL and suggested that it should merge into Oswald Mosley's British Union of Fascists, but the offer was declined. Leese rejected any overtures from Mosley because of the latter's initial reluctance to make antisemitism a central theme, leading to Leese dismissing Mosley as a "kosher fascist". He even dubbed the BUF the "British Jewnion of Fascists" over the issue. One of their biggest differences was that the IFL held a biological view of antisemitism, the belief that Jews were inherently inferior as a race, in contrast to the BUF, whose eventual adoption of anti-Semitism was framed in ideas about the Jews' supposed undue influence at the top echelons of society.

By 1933, the BUF decided to act against the renegade IFL, with Blackshirts attacking a number of meetings. The campaign culminated in an incident in Great Portland Street in which 50 Blackshirts disguised as communists invaded the stage to attack Leese before they caused considerable damage to the hall in an attempt to force a large repair bill onto the IFL. The BUF even passed fabricated evidence of an IFL plot to attack its headquarters to the Home Office. By 1939, with the IFL's influence diminished, the rivalry had cooled to the point that the BUF bookshop in Canterbury was prepared to stock IFL pamphlets.

Although rejecting a merger with the BUF, the IFL was linked to the Nordic League through Commander E. H. Cole, a staunch advocate of the Russian Czarist hoax The Protocols of the Elders of Zion, who served as chancellor of the League as well as being a leading IFL member. Before long, both Leese and P. J. Ridout also became members of the group, membership of which encompassed most shades of far-right activity.

== Decline ==
The outbreak of the Second World War caused the small group to fall apart, as Leese declared loyalty to King and country and renamed the group the Angles Circle but that stance was rejected by some pro-German members such as Tony Gittens, Harold Lockwood and Bertie Mills. The matter proved to be academic, however, as in 1940, Leese was interned under Defence Regulation 18B. In 1946, Leese and six others were arrested for aiding two escaped Dutch prisoners of war who had been members of the Waffen-SS and were planning to flee to Argentina. One of those arrested, Anthony William Gittens, was also a former IFL member, and would join the National Front in the 1960s. All seven men were convicted and each sentenced to one year in prison for their roles in the attempted escape. Leese was released from prison in November 1947. Although Leese continued to be politically active after the war, the IFL was not reformed. His formation of the National Workers Movement in 1948 meant the end for the IFL.

== See also ==
- List of British fascist parties
