= British Empire Union =

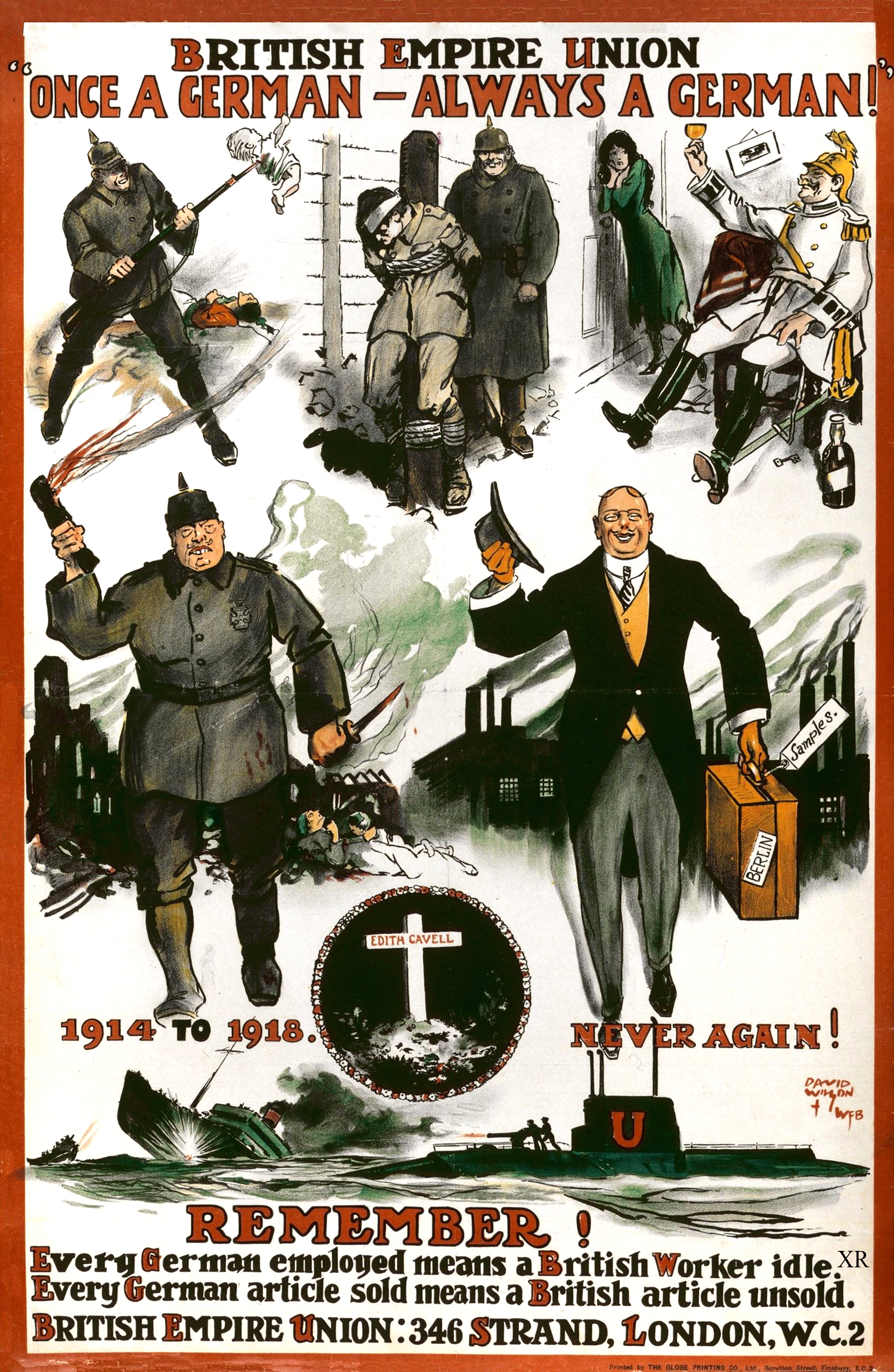
British Empire Union poster from the immediate post-war period, titled "Once a German—always a German!"

The British Empire Union (BEU) was created in the United Kingdom during the First World War, in 1916, after changing its name from the Anti-German Union, which had been founded in April 1915. From December 1922 to summer 1952, it published a regular journal.

It stood for patriotism, social reform, industrial peace, promotion of the Empire and anti-socialism.

On 28 July 1916 the Vice-Presidents of the BEU, Lord and Lady Bathurst, subscribed to a full-page advertisement in The Morning Post stating their objectives:

1. To consolidate the British Empire and to develop Trade and Commerce within the Empire and with our Allies.
2. To alter our existing naturalisation laws to render it impossible for aliens seeking naturalisation to become British citizens so long as they remain subjects of other countries. This is to apply to existing cases.
3. To pursue an Educational propaganda throughout the country in furtherance of the policies that have been expounded by Mr. W. M. Hughes [Prime Minister of Australia]; to establish branches in every constituency and county, and to support candidates pledged to these policies in both the country and in the House of Commons; to urge the importance of the measures proposed to assist the more vigorous prosecution of the war, and to bring about its speedy and satisfactory termination, and to controvert the false economic doctrine so aptly described as 'Laissez-faire'.

In 1936, the Soviet newspaper Izvestia attacked the BEU as the main opponent of socialism in Britain, which the BEU proudly quoted in its Report: "No other society was mentioned". In 1960, it was renamed the British Commonwealth Union and was taken over by a group of directors in 1975, who ceased its political activities.
