= Arnold Leese =

British fascist politician (1878–1956)

Arnold Spencer Leese
- Leese at an unspecified date
- Born: Arnold Spencer Leese; 16 November 1878; Lytham St Annes, Lancashire, England
- Died: 18 January 1956 (aged 77); London, England
- Education: Giggleswick School
- Occupation: Veterinarian
- Known for: Antisemitic writer and activist
- Notable work: A Treatise on the One-Humped Camel in Health and in Disease. (1927); My Irrelevant Defence (1938); Out of Step: Events in the Two Lives of an Anti-Jewish Camel Doctor (1951)
- Political party: British Fascists (1923–1925); National Fascisti (1925–1929); Imperial Fascist League (1929–1932)
- Spouse: May Winifred King

Arnold Spencer Leese (16 November 1878 – 18 January 1956) was a British fascist politician. Leese was initially prominent as a veterinary expert on camels. A virulent anti-Semite, he led his own fascist movement, the Imperial Fascist League, and was a prolific author and publisher of polemics both before and after the Second World War.

== Early life and education ==
Leese was born on 16 November 1878 in Lytham St Annes, Lancashire, England, the son of Spencer Leese, a manufacturer and artist. He was a nephew of Sir Joseph Francis Leese, 1st Baronet (1845–1914), and a second cousin of Sir Oliver Leese, 3rd Baronet (1894–1978). He had five sisters and one brother.

Leese was educated at Giggleswick School. The death of his father in 1894 left the family in financial difficulties, forcing Leese to leave boarding school. He nonetheless attended the Royal College of Veterinary Surgeons thanks to the financial help of his grandfather.

== Veterinary career ==
After graduating in 1903, Leese first worked as an equine clinician in London, then accepted a post at the Civil Veterinary Department in India in 1907, where he became an expert on the camel. He worked in India for six years, largely along the North-West Frontier, then was transferred to Italian Somaliland to work for the East Africa Government's veterinary department, where he was posted at the outbreak of the First World War in 1914.

Leese was recognised as a leading authority on the camel and published several articles on this animal and its maladies, the first appearing in The Journal of Tropical Veterinary Science in 1909. A camel parasite, Thelazia leesei was named after him by Louis-Joseph Alcide Railliet in 1910. In 1927, he published A Treatise on the One-Humped Camel in Health and in Disease, which would remain a standard work in India for fifty years.

During the First World War, Leese was commissioned in the Royal Army Veterinary Corps, then served as a Camel Purchase Officer to the Somaliland Remount Commission with the Camel Corps, and in France on the Western Front as a Veterinary Officer for the Advanced Horse Transport Depot. During the war, he married May Winifred King, the daughter of his former landlord. Leese returned to England and settled in Stamford, Lincolnshire, practising as a vet until retirement in June 1928.

== Fascist activist ==
In the early 1920s, Leese became interested in Italian Fascism and he developed a fascination with the Italian Fascist dictator Benito Mussolini. In April 1923, he wrote a short pamphlet, Fascism for Old England, praising the Duce and highlighting the "significance of fascism for Britain". He joined the British Fascists (BF) soon after its creation in May 1923, establishing his own branch in Stamford in March 1924, which soon gained 80 members. Leese despised however the BF policy of allowing former socialists and Jews in the party, contending that it was "honeycombed" with communist infiltrators. He further wrote that the BF "did not understand Fascism at all", the true nature of which was to Leese a "revolt against democracy and a return to statesmanship". An animal lover, he also claimed that the style of slaughter practised in Judaism influenced his anti-semitism.

Leese joined the Centre International d'Études sur le Fascisme (CINEF), an international 'think tank' based in Switzerland whose aim was the promotion of fascism, and served as its British correspondent. He also became close to one of his neighbours, the economist Arthur Kitson, a member of The Britons. Their friendship lasted until Kitson's death in 1937. The latter persuaded Leese that control of money was the key to power and that money was ultimately controlled by the Jews. Kitson supplied him with a copy of the Protocols of the Learned Elders of Zion, on which Leese wrote, "Everything in this little book rang true, I simply could not put it down until I had finished it." Leese also revered The Britons' founder Henry Hamilton Beamish as an anti-Jewish "pioneer". In 1924, he was elected a councillor to Stamford Borough Council along with fellow fascist Harry Simpson, becoming the first elected fascist councillors in Britain. The British Fascists had generally chosen not to intervene in "the despised democratic system", and Leese's own contempt for democracy seems to have been paradoxically reinforced by the election. He wrote, "Many people I knew voted for me because I had cured their pigs or pets and without the slightest idea what I stood for".

Leese was generally unsatisfied with the policies of the British Fascists, dismissing them as "conservatism with knobs on". In 1925, he and Simpson joined a splinter group of the BF, the National Fascisti (NF), renamed in July 1926 the British National Fascists (BNF). Leese took the Stamford BF branch over to the BNF and, following the collapse of the BNF in May 1927, founded the 'Fascist League' from the remnants of the Stamford BNF. In October 1927, he stepped down as a councillor after having served a single term, and retired in June 1928, at 50, before moving to Guildford, Surrey.

== Imperial Fascist League ==
Emblem of the Imperial Fascist League, founded and headed by Leese from 1929 to 1939

In 1929, Leese established his own organization, the Imperial Fascist League (IFL). The movement was initially modelled more along the lines of Italian fascism but, under the influence of Henry Hamilton Beamish, it began to focus on anti-semitism. The IFL and its extensive publishing interests were funded out of Leese's own pocket. In 1932, Oswald Mosley approached Leese with the aim of absorbing the IFL into his own British Union of Fascists. Although relations between the two men were initially cordial (Leese had addressed a New Party meeting on 27 April 1932 on the theme of "The Blindness of British Politics under the Jew Money-Power" that was chaired by Mosley), Leese soon began attacking Mosley for his failure to deal with the "Jewish question"; he eventually labelled Mosley's group "kosher fascists", and sardonically nicknamed the BUF the "British Jewnion of Fascists". Leese even went so far as to falsely claim that Mosley's first wife, Lady Cynthia, was "of Jewish descent", alleging that she "had had a Jewish grandfather", and that the marriage had therefore "defiled racial purity".

Leese's anti-semitism had become his defining political characteristic by that point and it came to take on an increasingly conspiratorial and hysterical tone. This increased after Leese visited Germany and met Julius Streicher, and he subsequently remodelled the IFL newspaper The Fascist along the lines of Der Stürmer. His antisemitism took on the theme of the Aryan race as the creator of civilisation and culture and he claimed that the Aryan was in a permanent struggle with the Jew, the outcome of which would determine the future completely. Leese's views, which extended to proposing the mass murder of Jews by the use of gas chambers as early as 1935, earned him a prison sentence in 1936. In 1936, Leese and fellow IFL member and printer Walter Whitehead were tried on six counts related to two articles published in the July issue of The Fascist entitled "Jewish Ritual Murder", which later appeared as a pamphlet. They were found guilty on two counts. Leese was sentenced to six months in prison for seditious libel "with intent to create ill will between his Majesty's subjects of the Jewish faith and those not of the Jewish faith so as to create a public mischief." Whitehead was fined £20. The judge berated Leese at sentencing.

"I am satisfied that nothing can be more mischievous to the public weal than the circulation of statements of this kind. I can appreciate that behind what you have done there is possibly a belief amounting in its intensity almost to fanaticism with regard to the truth or otherwise of these statements. That the public well-being can be served by the publication of stuff of this kind -- and I call it "stuff" advisably -- I cannot imagine. Nothing can be more harmful to the public weal than that."

Upon his release, he edited another pamphlet entitled My Irrelevant Defence, a lengthy work in defence of his earlier claim that Jewish Passover celebrations included the sacrifice of Christian children. He also used materials distributed by the Welt-Dienst news service headed by Ulrich Fleischhauer and wrote for it.

== Second World War ==
Leese was one of the last leaders of the fascist movement to be interned in the United Kingdom at the beginning of the Second World War under the Defence Regulation 18B. Leese, who claimed that his primary loyalty was to Britain, had been somewhat critical of Adolf Hitler since the start of the war and he reacted with bitter anger when an internment order was issued for him in June 1940. Having set up a series of hideouts from which he published several pamphlets that were critical of the war, he evaded capture until 9 November 1940. Still enraged by what he saw as a slur on his patriotism, Leese violently resisted arrest and smashed up his holding cell. Leese saw the war as a "Jew's War" but he strongly repudiated the Hitler-Stalin Pact and castigated the Nazis for their invasion of Norway. (Leese labelled his political creed "Racial Fascism" because he disliked the term "National Socialism" which was used by the Nazis, although he and other members of the IFL supported Nazi anti-semitism). He was released from detention in 1944 on health grounds following a major operation.

At the close of the War, he offered to testify at William Joyce's trial. Along with Beamish he was prepared to give evidence on the "Jewish issue" at Nuremberg in defence of the Nazis. Leese described the Nuremberg Trials as a "Jewish and Masonic affair, like the procedure in this country under '18.B'; it is an act of Revenge".

== Post-war activity ==
Soon after the end of the Second World War, Leese set up his own "Jewish Information Bureau" and began publishing his own journal, Gothic Ripples, which was largely concerned with attacking the Jews. He believed that there were 2.5m Jews in Britain at the time, seven times the actual number. The magazine also contained a strongly anti-black racist bent, with a regular column entitled "Nigger Notes" appearing. Gothic Ripples was an early proponent of what would come to be known as Holocaust denial, noting in 1953 that "The fable of the slaughter of six million Jews by Hitler has never been tackled by Gothic Ripples because we take the view that we would have liked Hitler even better if the figure had been larger; we are so 'obsessed with anti-semitism' that we believe that as long as the destruction was done in a humane manner, it was to the advantage of everyone ... if it had been true. However, it wasn't."

In 1946, Leese and six others, Emanuel John William Alford, Leslie Raymond Alford, Alfred McCarthy, Alfred John Robert McCarthy, Frederick Tom Edmunds, and Anthony William Gittens, were arrested for aiding two escaped Dutch prisoners of war who had been members of the Waffen-SS and were planning to flee to Argentina through the ratlines. At his trial, Edmunds openly admitted that he was a fascist. Tony Gittens had joined the Britons in 1924, and served as its secretary from 1950 until his death in 1973. Gittens joined the Imperial Fascist League in the 1930s and, in the late 1960s, he joined the National Front and worked with its founder, A. K. Chesterton.

Leese and his six accomplices were each found guilty sentenced to one year in prison for their roles in the attempted escape. Leese was released from prison in November 1947. In 1948, Leese formed the National Workers Movement in London. In December 1950 he stood trial for criminal libel on Harold Scott, Commissioner of the Metropolitan Police, but was acquitted. In 1951, he published his autobiography Out of Step: Events in the Two Lives of an Anti-Jewish Camel Doctor.

Leese was a mentor to Colin Jordan and John Tyndall, the "most significant figures on the extreme right since the 1960s". After his death, his widow, May Winifred Leese (died 1974), helped fund far-right groups. His London house, 74 Princedale Road, Holland Park, was left to Jordan, and became known as 'Arnold Leese House'. The property became Jordan's base of operations, housing the White Defence League, the National Socialist Movement and other far-right operations.

Leese died 18 January 1956, aged 77.

== Works ==
Articles

- "The Jewish Method of Cattle Slaughter: The Legalised Cruelty of Shechita". 1940.
- "Chinese Communism?". Gothic Ripples, No. 49, 28 February 1949.
- "The Destruction of India: Its Cause and Prevention". Undated.

Books

- A Treatise on the One-Humped Camel in Health and in Disease . Stamford, Lincolnshire: Haynes & Son. 1927 – via Wikisource.
- My Irrelevant Defence: Being Meditations Inside Gaol and Out on Jewish Ritual Murder. London: The I.F.L. Printing and Publishing Co., 1938. LCCN 46-29653
  - Swedish translation: Mitt Irrelevanta Försvar varandes Betraktelser bakom galler och ute om Judiska Ritualmord.
  - Judaism in Action. New and enlarged edition, 1964. LCCN 2001-373913
- Gentile Folly: The Rothschilds. London: Angles News Service, 1940.
- The Jewish War of Survival. Arnold S. Leese, January 1945.
- Out of Step: Events in Two Lives of an Anti-Jewish Camel-Doctor. Guildford, UK. 1951. LCCN 53-25974
  - Excerpts available.
- The Era Of World Ruin! (The Era Of Democracy). Undated.

Pamphlets

- Our Jewish Aristocracy. London: Imperial Fascist League, 1936. OCLC 3595498. 18 pages.
  - Reprint: Hollywood, California: Sons of Liberty, 1936. 8 pages.
- The Mass Madness of Sept. 1938 and its Jewish Cause. London: Imperial Fascist League, 1938. OCLC 40911990. 15 pages.
- The Edict of Expulsion of 1290: A catalogue of recorded history surrounding Jewry under Angevin Kings of England, leading up to the Edict of Expulsion by King Edward I (Co-authored with Geoffrey H. Smith). Undated.
