= Gertrude Hiscox =

British collaborator with Nazi Germany

Gertrude Blount Hiscox (later Houston; 23 August 1910 – 1969) was a British collaborator with Nazi Germany in World War II. In 1941, she was convicted of an offence under the Defence Regulations and sentenced to five years' penal servitude.

== Biography ==
Hiscox was born in Hendon, Middlesex to James Hiscox and Ethel Blount.

Hiscox was heavily involved in the inter-war politics of the British far-right. She joined the British Union of Fascists in 1934 and was the organizer of the 8th London Area BUF. She was the girlfriend of the notorious BUF member Richard Alister "Jock" Houston, a prominent street activist and anti-Semitic agitator. The couple lived at 50 Thornton Road, Streatham.

Hiscox was employed as a travel agent specialising in German holidays and visited Germany regularly from 1935.

In July 1937, she was a founding member of the Link, an organisation to promote Anglo-German friendship. She was also a member of the Right Club, a pro-German society founded by the right-wing extremist Captain Archibald Maule Ramsay, the MP for Peebles and Southern Midlothian.

She wrote a letter to Hitler on 31 August 1939 pledging her support to Germany in the event of conflict. Great Britain declared war on 3 September 1939 and the letter was intercepted by the wartime censor and returned to Hiscox.

== Wartime activity ==
Hiscox was detained under Defence Regulation 18B in 1940 but by early 1941 she had been released and was living in Chiswick, London, with her lodger, Norah Briscoe, a temporary shorthand typist at the Ministry of Supply. The Ministry of Supply was an important wartime department set up in 1939 to co-ordinate the supply of equipment to the British armed forces and Briscoe was both a former member of the BUF and an active pro-German sympathiser.

In March 1941 Hiscox invited a fellow-member of the Right Club to tea at her home, but unknown to her he was an MI5 agent monitoring the activities of its membership. In conversation, Briscoe disclosed to the agent that she was working in a sensitive area of the Ministry, that she was keeping carbon copies of documents she thought would be useful to Germany and that she wanted to pass them on. These documents related to the sites of war factories, shortages of strategic materials and the establishment of submarine bases in Northern Ireland.

== Arrest ==
A meeting was set up by the agent and when the classified documents were handed over at the flat of a supposed German agent, 'Harald Kurtz', Hiscox and Briscoe were arrested. They subsequently appeared at Bow Street Magistrates' Court on 17 March 1941 and were remanded to Holloway Prison.

== Trial ==
On 16 June 1941, Hiscox and Briscoe were tried in camera at the Old Bailey where they both pleaded guilty to a charge under Defence Regulation 2A of intentionally communicating information which was likely to assist the enemy. The trial lasted less than an hour. Hiscox was sentenced to 5 years' penal servitude, as was Briscoe.

== Subsequent life ==
On her release, Hiscox resumed her life with Jock Houston. She took his surname in November 1944 and confirmed the change by deed poll in May 1946.

Gertrude Houston died in 1969 in Ipswich.

== See also ==
- Leonard Banning
- Norah Briscoe
- Tyler Kent
- John Lingshaw
- Dorothy O'Grady
- Pearl Vardon
- Anna Wolkoff
