= Enid Riddell =

British socialite and racing driver

- Born: Enid Mary Riddell; 23 March 1903; Marylebone, London, England
- Died: 25 March 1980 (aged 77); Chelsea, London, England
- Occupation: Racing driver
- Organization(s): Nordic League; Right Club

Enid Mary Riddell (23 March 1903 – 25 March 1980) was a British socialite and racing driver during the 1930s and 1940s. She was also a member of some far-right political groups in the United Kingdom and was imprisoned for violating the Official Secrets Act 1911 during the Second World War.

== Biography ==
=== Early years ===
Riddell was born in Marylebone, London, on 23 March 1903.

=== Middle years ===
Described as a striking and poised young woman-about-town, Riddell pursued two interests: motor racing and fascism. She was a member of the Nordic League, a far-right, pro-Nazi organisation that worked to co-ordinate similarly-minded groups in Britain.

She was also a member of the Right Club (RC), a British fascist and antisemitic group established by the Scottish Unionist member of parliament (MP) Archibald Maule Ramsay, who was often referred to as "Captain Ramsay".

Riddell had been recruited to the RC by Anna Wolkoff, daughter of Admiral Nikolai Wolkoff (1870–1954), the last Imperial Russian naval attaché posted to London before the revolution. Wolkoff held right-wing, antisemitic, anti-communist views and was considered a Nazi sympathiser. Her family was naturalised and ran the Russian Tea Rooms in London. Riddell and Wolkoff maintained a long-lasting association.

When Britain declared war, Ramsay closed the RC down, but several women members, with Riddell prominent among them, kept the organisation in operation. Riddell trained as Wolkoff's understudy and as an aide-de-camp for Ramsay. Immediately after the arrest of Kent and Wolkoff, Riddell moved the meetings of the RC to the Wolkoffs' Russian Tea Rooms.

It was through Wolkoff that Riddell became involved in the Tyler Kent affair. Kent was a cypher clerk at the American embassy in London. He stole copies of correspondence between the American president, Franklin Delano Roosevelt, and Winston Churchill wherein Roosevelt, while publicly avowing America's neutrality, was making commitments that would draw the US into the war. Churchill was at the time First Lord of the Admiralty, and was communicating with the American president without the knowledge of the prime minister, Neville Chamberlain. Publication of the correspondence had the potential to harm both Roosevelt and Churchill. The documents were believed to have been forwarded to Germany via a contact at the Italian embassy in London.

In January 1940, Riddell, Wolkoff, Kent and Don Francesco Maringliano Duco Del Monte, an Italian assistant military attaché in London, met at the restaurant L'Escargot in Soho. Riddell and Del Monte tried to arrange another meeting with Kent at La Coquille restaurant, but by this time Kent had already been arrested. Riddell was called to testify as a witness for the defence for Kent and Wolkoff.

Riddell's flat was raided on 21 May 1940. Apart from her message to Kent, nothing significant was found. Riddell was interviewed at Scotland Yard, and her unco-operative responses convinced the officer questioning her that she knew more than she was saying, and that immediate detention was warranted.

In 1940, Riddell was convicted of offences under the Official Secrets Act 1911, then detained under the expanded Defence Regulation 18B (DR 18B) and interned in Holloway prison.

=== Later years ===
After her release from prison in 1943, Riddell resumed her activity in right-wing groups. She later moved to Málaga, Spain, where she ran a club called La Rascasse ("The Scorpion Fish"), a reference to the tight final corner of the Grand Prix course at Monaco, and the bar located inside its radius.

In 1973, Wolkoff visited Riddell in Spain. With her eyesight failing, Riddell allowed Wolkoff to drive, and the pair's car was struck from behind, throwing Wolkoff out to her death.

Riddell died in London in March 1980 at the age of 77.

== Racing career ==
In 1933, Riddell appeared in the Monte Carlo Rally driving an Alvis Speed 20, retiring due to fuel problems.

In May 1933, she bought a new MG K3 Magnette, chassis K3008, registered as AGW 37. The car was loaned to Hugh Hamilton, who drove it in the 1933 Mannin Beg and at Donington Park on 19 August the same year. Riddell drove K3008 in the 1934 Rallye Paris - Saint-Raphaël Féminin, where she finished first in class and second overall, and also posted the fastest time of the day on the Pougues Les Eaux hill climb stage.

She appeared in the Monte Carlo rally again in 1934, this time in an AC 16/80, paired with co-driver H. Comtesse Moy.

Riddell and K3008 ran the Paris - Saint-Raphaël again in 1935, 1936 and 1938, finishing ninth in 1935 and first in class in 1938. She appeared in the race again in 1939 in a Frazer Nash BMW.

In May 1936, Riddell and K3008 ran the hillclimb at La Turbie, where she took second place.

At the 1937 24 Hours of Le Mans, an MG PB owned by George Eyston was co-driven to a 16th place finish by Dorothy Stanley-Turner and a driver listed as Joan Riddell. Some references assert that Joan Riddell was actually Enid Riddell. While some have suggested that the name Joan Riddell is a conflation of Enid Riddell and Joan Richmond, one source mentions both Joan Riddell and Joan Richmond as distinct persons at the race. Another source of biographical information for the 1937 race records a full name of Joan Hardwick Riddell, born in Wales on 16 April 1912, died July 1997 in Surrey. A summary written shortly after the event lists Enid Riddell as Dorothy Turner's partner in an MG in the 751-1100 cc class.

Riddell took second place, a first in the 2 L class and the Coupe des Dames trophy in July 1946 at the Rallye des Alpes Françaises, driving a 1937 AC 16/80 Competition Sports, registration EPJ 101, partnered with Betty Haig.

Riddell drove an Austin-Healey 100 registered NUE 854 with co-driver Betty Haig in the 1954 Paris St. Raphael. They finished seventh overall, taking a class win in the 2000–3000 cc class and a Coupe de Vitesse.
