= Norah Briscoe =

British Nazi collaborator (1899–1995)

Norah Constance Lavinia Briscoe (née Davies, 1899–1995) was a British collaborator who attempted to supply classified information to Nazi Germany during World War II. In 1941, she was convicted of an offence under the Defence Regulations and sentenced to five years’ penal servitude.

== Biography ==
Norah Briscoe was born into a middle-class family in Wirral, Cheshire and was brought up in Liverpool. After her mother gave birth to triplets she was sent to live with two elderly aunts. She felt rejected and a convent schooling increased her sense of rejection.

She married Reginald Briscoe, a civil servant in 1925 at Birkenhead and they were living in Kingston on Thames when he died of acute appendicitis in 1932.

She began a career as a freelance journalist and writer and in 1934 she travelled to Germany to write articles. Briscoe later wrote in her unpublished autobiography: "We seemed to have found in that other land of mountains and streams and towering forests, a corner of the world as remote from war and evil as was possible... You could pray, dance, drink, smoke, and worship as you pleased. Young men in leather breeches leaped over flames on Midsummer Night in a pagan ritual and heard Mass next day. You could follow any creed you liked – provided you followed the Führer, too. And whose business was that but their own?"

There she became enthused by National Socialism, so much so that in 1936 she placed her only child, Paul born in 1930, with a German friend, Seppl Sauter. Paul was to be brought up in the Sauter family in Miltenberg, Lower Franconia, where he received a German education and joined the Hitler Youth. In 1939, with war in Europe looming, Briscoe made no attempt to bring her son home and when Britain declared war on 3 September 1939, Paul was stranded in Germany.

Briscoe joined the British Union of Fascists and was a BUF Team Leader in Bournemouth. She was also a member of the Right Club, a pro-German society founded by the right-wing extremist, Captain Archibald Maule Ramsay, the MP for Peebles and Southern Midlothian.

== Wartime activity ==
In early 1941, Briscoe was living as the lodger of Gertrude Hiscox in Chiswick, London. Like Briscoe, Hiscox was a former member of the BUF, an active pro-German sympathiser and a fellow member of the Right Club.

Briscoe worked as a temporary shorthand typist at the Ministry of Supply from 21 January 1941. This Ministry was an important wartime department set up in 1939 to co-ordinate the supply of equipment to the British armed forces.

In March 1941, Hiscox invited a fellow-member of the Right Club called “John” to tea at her home, but unknown to her he was an undercover MI5 agent monitoring the activities of its membership. In conversation, Briscoe disclosed to the agent that she was working in a sensitive area of the Ministry, that she was keeping carbon copies of documents she thought would be useful to Germany and that she wanted to pass them on. These documents related to the sites of war factories, shortages of strategic materials and the establishment of submarine bases in Northern Ireland.

== Arrest ==
A meeting was set up by the agent and when the classified documents were handed over at the flat of a supposed German agent, 'Harald Kurtz', Briscoe and Hiscox were arrested. A police search found letters of introduction to foreign fascists at Briscoe's flat. Briscoe and Hiscox subsequently appeared at Bow Street magistrate's court on 17 March 1941 and were remanded to Holloway Prison.

== Trial ==
On 16 June 1941, Briscoe and Hiscox were tried in camera at the Old Bailey where they both pleaded guilty to a charge under Defence Regulation 2A of intentionally communicating information which was likely to assist the enemy. The trial lasted less than an hour. Briscoe was sentenced to five years' penal servitude, as was Hiscox.

On release, Briscoe was immediately made the subject of a detention order under Defence Regulation 18B.

== Subsequent life ==
After the war, Briscoe was released on license. She was reunited with her son in the summer of 1945. She lived with him for the last 30 years of her life until her death in 1996.

== See also ==
- Leonard Banning
- Gertrude Hiscox
- Tyler Kent
- John Lingshaw
- Dorothy O'Grady
- Pearl Vardon
- Anna Wolkoff

== Source ==
- Paul Briscoe (2007). My Friend the Enemy: My Childhood in Nazi Germany. Aurum Press. ISBN 978-1-84513-231-6.
