= J. F. C. Fuller =

British Army general (1878–1966)

Major-General J. F. C. Fuller CB CBE DSO
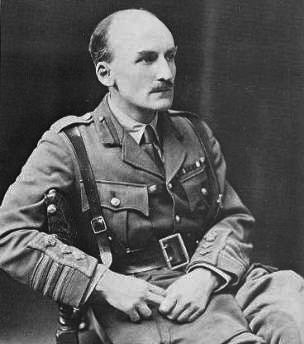
- Born: 1 September 1878; Chichester, West Sussex, England
- Died: 10 February 1966 (aged 87); Falmouth, Cornwall, England
- Military career
- Allegiance: United Kingdom
- Branch: British Army
- Service years: 1899–1933
- Rank: Major-General
- Nickname: "Boney"
- Service number: 16
- Unit: Oxfordshire and Buckinghamshire Light Infantry
- Commands: 14th Infantry Brigade
- Conflicts: Second Boer War; First World War
- Awards: Companion of the Order of the Bath; Commander of the Order of the British Empire; Distinguished Service Order
- Other work: Military historian, occultist, author

Major-General John Frederick Charles "Boney" Fuller (1 September 1878 – 10 February 1966) was a senior British Army officer, a military historian and strategist, a fascist, and an occultist.

During World War I, Fuller became a staff officer in the Tank Corps and helped plan the tank attack during the Battle of Cambrai. His Plan 1919 for a fully mechanised offensive against the German army was not implemented, due to the end of the war.

As a military theorist, Fuller was highly prolific and his ideas influenced army officers in Britain, Germany and the USA. He emphasised the potential of new weapons, especially tanks and aircraft, and was regarded as one of the progenitors of blitzkrieg.

After retiring from the Army, Fuller became an admirer of Nazism, and a member of several fascist and pro-Nazi organisations including the British Union of Fascists and the Right Club. In 1940 he was involved in two coup plots against the British government. Despite this, unlike many other British fascists, he avoided internment, possibly due to his military connections.

== Early life ==
Fuller was born in Chichester, West Sussex, the son of Alfred Fuller (1832–1927), an Anglican clergyman, and Selma Marie Philippine (1847- –1940), née de la Chevallerie, of French descent but raised in Germany. Alfred Fuller retired as rector of Itchenor and moved to Chichester, where his son was born. After moving to Lausanne with his parents as a boy, he returned to England at the age of 11 without them; three years later, at "the somewhat advanced age of 14", he began attending Malvern College and, later trained for an army career at the Royal Military College, Sandhurst, from 1897 to 1898. His nickname of "Boney", which he was to retain, is said to have come either from an admiration for Napoleon Bonaparte, or from an imperious manner combined with military brilliance which resembled Napoleon's.

== Military career ==
=== Pre-World War I ===
Fuller was commissioned into the 1st Battalion of the Oxfordshire Light Infantry (the old 43rd Foot) on 3 August 1898. He served in the Second Boer War in South Africa from December 1899 to 1902, and was promoted to lieutenant on 24 February 1900 a couple of months after arriving there. In the spring of 1904 Fuller was sent with his unit to India, where he contracted typhoid fever in autumn of 1905; he returned to England the next year on sick-leave, where he met the woman he married in December 1906 – Margaretha "Sonia" Karnatzki, the daughter of a Warsaw doctor. Instead of returning to India, he was reassigned to Volunteer units in England, serving as adjutant to the 2nd South Middlesex Volunteers (amalgamated into the Kensingtons during the Haldane Reforms) and helping to form the new 10th Middlesex. Fuller later claimed that his position with the 10th Middlesex inspired him to study soldiering seriously. In 1913, he was accepted into the Staff College, Camberley, starting work there in January 1914.

=== World War I ===
During the First World War, Fuller was a staff officer with the Home Forces and with VII Corps in France, and from 1916 in the Headquarters of the Machine-Gun Corps' Heavy Branch which was later to become the Tank Corps. In September 1917, he held discussions with the Minister of Munitions Winston Churchill at the Tank Corps Headquarters in Bermicourt. He helped plan the tank attack at the 20 November 1917 Battle of Cambrai and the tank operations for the autumn offensives of 1918. His Plan 1919 for a fully mechanised offensive against the German army was never implemented. After 1918, in January of which he was promoted to brevet lieutenant colonel, he held various leading positions, notably as a commander of an experimental brigade at Aldershot. He participated in the Allied Tank Committee in London in February 1918.

=== War Office and retirement ===
After the war Fuller, who in January 1919 was promoted to brevet colonel in recognition of "valuable services rendered in connection with the War", collaborated with his colleague B. H. Liddell Hart in developing new ideas for the mechanisation of armies, launching a crusade for the mechanisation and modernisation of the British Army. Chief instructor at the Staff College, Camberley from 1923, he served at the War Office as a GSO1 became military assistant to the chief of the Imperial General Staff in 1926. He was appointed a Commander of the Order of the British Empire (CBE) in the 1926 Birthday Honours. In what came to be known as the "Tidworth Incident", Fuller turned down the command of the Experimental Mechanized Force, which was formed on 27 August 1927. The appointment also carried responsibility for a regular infantry brigade and the garrison of Tidworth Camp on Salisbury Plain. Fuller believed he would be unable to devote himself to the Experimental Mechanized Force and the development of mechanized warfare techniques without extra staff to assist him with the additional extraneous duties, which the War Office refused to allocate. He was consulted on the development of warfare by Winston Churchill, then Chancellor of the Exchequer, in the summer of 1928. Fuller was promoted to major-general in 1930 and after refusing the command of the Second Class District of Bombay retired in December 1933 to devote himself entirely to writing.

== Political activism ==
=== Pre-World War II ===
==== Involvement with British fascism ====
Impatient with what he considered the inability of democracy to adopt military reforms and taking a "very conventional soldier's view of politics", Fuller became involved with Sir Oswald Mosley and the British fascist movement. He enlisted in the British Union of Fascists (BUF) in mid-1934. He sat on the party's Policy Directorate and was considered one of Mosley's closest allies. He had already lectured to the fascist-leaning New Britain Group in 1932. He also became a member of the clandestine far-right group the Nordic League by July 1939, a member of Lord Lymington's British Council against European Commitments (formed in September 1938) and of the Imperial Fascist League, as well as an editor of the New Pioneer (founded in December 1938), the monthly organ of English Array, a fascist group led by Lord Lymington. By March 1936 he was reported to claim that Mosley was an obstacle to fascism in Britain. His wife also became involved in BUF activities, attending Mosley's Earls Court Exhibition Centre in July 1939 and dinner meetings with Fuller's fellow far-right conspirators during the Phoney War.

==== Involvement with foreign fascism ====
After preparing a report on the party organisation of BUF in October 1934, Fuller travelled to Nazi Germany in January 1935 alongside Oswald Mosley's confidant William Edward David Allen on a mission to study the Nazi Party structure and was the only foreigner present at the first Nazi German armed manoeuvres.

A rare Italophile within the BUF ranks after 1935 and a member of the British Union of Friends of Italy, he acted as the military correspondent for the Daily Mail from the Italian camp during the Italian invasion of Ethiopia (1935), comparing Mussolini's invading force to the crusaders and the Hussites. Following his return, he was quizzed about the war by Winston Churchill at a Buck's Club dinner in the company of B. H. Liddell Hart and Lord Trenchard.

Fuller also travelled to Spain in March 1937, October 1937 and April 1938; his coverage of the Civil War, published in several outlets, was written from an "extremely pro-Nationalist" perspective, according to a War Office report.

Fuller visited Nazi Germany regularly and came to know a number of the Nazi Party leaders. He frequently praised Adolf Hitler in his speeches and articles, once describing him as "that realistic idealist who has awakened the common sense of the British people by setting out to create a new Germany". He came to believe that the Nazis had created a "scientific" state. On 20 April 1939, Fuller was an honoured guest at Hitler's 50th birthday parade (attending "with official disapproval" along with Baron Brocket), watching as "for three hours a completely mechanised and motorised army roared past the Führer." Afterwards Hitler asked, "I hope you were pleased with your children?" Fuller replied, "Your Excellency, they have grown up so quickly that I no longer recognise them."

Fuller's ideas on mechanised warfare continued to be influential in the lead-up to the Second World War, ironically less with his countrymen than with the Nazis, notably Heinz Guderian who spent his own money to have Fuller's Provisional Instructions for Tank and Armoured Car Training translated. In the 1930s, the German Army implemented tactics similar in many ways to Fuller's analysis, which became known as Blitzkrieg. Like Fuller, theorists of Blitzkrieg partly based their approach on the theory that areas of large enemy activity should be bypassed to be eventually surrounded and destroyed. Blitzkrieg-style tactics were used by several nations throughout the Second World War, predominantly by the Germans in the invasion of Poland (1939), Western Europe (1940), and the Soviet Union (1941). While Germany and to some degree the Western Allies adopted Blitzkrieg ideas, they were not much used by the Red Army, which developed its armored warfare doctrine based on deep operations, which were developed by Soviet military theorists Marshal M. N. Tukhachevsky et al. in the 1920s based on their experiences in the First World War and the Russian Civil War.

=== World War II ===
==== Pro-Nazi activities ====
At one meeting of the Right Club, which had been set up in May 1939, Fuller declared the need for "a bloody revolution" in Britain and added "I am ready to start one right away." He delivered a talk on "The Hebrew Mysteries" to the Nordic League in March 1939, and in mid-1939 was a speaker for The Link at its "most violently pro-Nazi and anti-Semitic branch" in Central London. Prior to the war, he was a regular guest at George Pitt-Rivers's estate in Hinton St Mary, worked closely with George Drummond, the "madly pro-German and anti-Jew" chairman of Drummonds Bank and president of the Northampton branch of The Link, and was known to the MI5 as an associate of Philip Tonstall Farrer (an ex-intelligence officer with Nazi links), the German prince Hans Heinrich XVII von Hochberg, and Archibald Maule Ramsay (the founder of the Right Club).

He continued to speak out in favour of a peaceful settlement with Germany. In July 1939, he was reported by the Evening Standard as the prospective BUF candidate at the 1940 general election. In October 1939, he conferred in private with Barry Domvile and Lancelot Lawton; a source described him on the occasion as "very interesting but very bloodthirsty". Between October 1939 and February 1940, he took part in a series of secret meetings held by the Marquess of Tavistock, a Hitler enthusiast, to discuss plans for collaboration with the Third Reich.

==== Plots to overthrow the British government ====
In a plot organized by John Beckett, Fuller was named as the Minister of Defence for a Quisling government. General Edmund Ironside had been implicated as a potential leader of the coup, with Fuller telling retired Admiral Barry Domvile, a fellow Nazi sympathizer, on 12 November 1939, that "Ironside is with us." A fellow conspirator, Samuel Darwin-Fox, told an MI5 agent that:

"Italy would declare war almost immediately, that France would then give in and that Britain would follow before the end of the week. There would be a short civil war, the Government would leave first for Bristol and then for the Colonies, General Ironside would become dictator and after things had settled down Germany could do as she liked with Britain."

Fuller was a regular attendee and occasional speaker at Norman Hay and Lancelot Lawton's pro-Nazi Information and Policy group, which met weekly from January 1940; he left the final meeting on 23 May 1940 in alarm at the news of Captain Ramsay and Norah Elam's arrest by the new war cabinet under Defence Regulation 18B and explained to the Evening Standard that he had come for "a lecture on egg farming". He agreed with Mosley, Liddell Hart and David Lloyd George that it was in the interest of Britain and Europe to make a deal with Hitler after the Battle of France in the summer of 1940 (he later called Churchill, whom he had still admired in 1937, "the greatest mountebank since Nero"). In November 1940, he offered to take part in organising aid for the fascist detainees.

==== Avoiding internment ====
Fuller had been under suspicion for his Nazi sympathies for some time. In his war diaries (p. 201), Alan Brooke commented that "the Director of Security called on him [in 1941] to discuss Boney Fuller and his Nazi activities", but failed to persuade him Fuller "had any unpatriotic intentions". Although Fuller was not interned or arrested, he was the only officer of his rank not invited to return to service during the war.

There was some suspicion that he was not incarcerated in May 1940 along with other leading officials of the BUF because of his association with General Ironside and other senior officers. According to historian Brian Holden-Reid, the decision not to arrest him was made by Churchill himself. Mosley himself admitted to "a little puzzlement" as to why Fuller had not been imprisoned, but Fuller's wife claimed he knew too much to ever be arrested. Ironside had in fact tried to appoint Fuller as his deputy while serving as the Chief of the General Staff in September or October 1939, but the move was blocked by the War Secretary Leslie Hore-Belisha.

==== Further pro-Nazi activities ====
Fuller resumed his pro-Nazi activities by 1942. In July 1942, B. H. Liddell Hart also renewed the friendship that had been severed by Fuller in 1937. Fuller joined the fascist Constitutional Research Association, founded in 1941 by Major Harry Edmonds, and participated in private lunches at the Charing Cross Hotel with its members, among them John Middleton Murry, Admiral Domvile, and the Earl of Portsmouth (the former Lord Lymington) by 1943 and as late as 1944. He became a leading officer of the British National Party, formed in 1942, and was a member of the National Front After Victory, organised at the end of the war by A. K. Chesterton. In December 1944, he attacked Winston Churchill's policy of unconditional surrender in the Sunday Pictorial. His opposition to the Allied war doctrine was predicated on his fear of Soviet domination, and he postulated a World War III by 1944.

=== Post-World War II ===
After the war, Fuller published most of his writings in the obscure US journal Ordnance, produced by the American Ordnance Association, whose secretary Leo A. Codd was a devoted enthusiast of his work since the 1920s.

In 1949, during a meeting in Cairo with Abdul Rahman Hassan Azzam, the Secretary General of the Arab League, Robert Gordon-Canning tried to persuade him to accept Fuller's services as a lecturer with a view to inspiring new Arab campaigns against Israel. In 1951, Fuller was asked by the American journalist Harold Montgomery Belgion, a critic of the Nuremberg trials, to comment on Duke of Bedford's proposal for demilitarising Western Europe. In 1954, he expressed his conviction that it should be the British aim to "blow up the Russian Imperialism internally" in a letter to the retired Lieutenant General Giffard Le Quesne Martel.

By 1951, Fuller became a propagandist and supporter of the Munich-based Anti-Bolshevik Bloc of Nations, and he contributed to the crypto-fascist West German journal Nation Europa from 1951 to 1958. He later joined the League of Empire Loyalists, formed in 1954.

He spent his last years believing that the wrong side had won the Second World War. He most fully announced that thesis in the 1961 edition of The Reformation of War. There, he announced his belief that Hitler was the saviour of the West against the Soviet Union and denounced Churchill and Roosevelt for being too stupid to see so. Fuller died in Falmouth, Cornwall, in 1966.

== Military theories ==
Fuller was a vigorous, expressive, and opinionated writer of military history and of controversial predictions of the future of war, publishing On Future Warfare in 1928. He was heavily influenced by the late Victorian doctrine of Social Imperialism, which drew on Social Darwinism and proposed to stem imperial decline with order and efficiency. Seeing his teachings largely vindicated by the Second World War, he published Machine Warfare: An Enquiry into the Influence of Mechanics on the Art of War in 1942.

=== The Foundations of the Science of War (1926) ===
Fuller is perhaps best known today for his "Nine Principles of War" which have formed the foundation of much of modern military theory since the 1930s, and which were originally derived from a convergence of Fuller's mystical and military interests. The Nine Principles went through several iterations; Fuller stated that "the system evolved from six principles in 1912, rose to eight in 1915, to, virtually, nineteen in 1923, and then descended to nine in 1925". For example, notice how his analysis of General Ulysses S. Grant was presented in 1929.

The United States Army modified Fuller's list and issued its first list of the principles of war in 1921, making it the basis of advanced training for officers into the 1990s, when it finally reconceptualised its training.

==== The Nine Principles of War ====
The Nine Principles involve the uses of force (combat power). They have been expressed in various ways, but Fuller's 1925 arrangement is as follows:

1. Direction: What is the overall aim? Which objectives must be met to achieve the aim?
2. Concentration: Where will the commander focus the most effort?
3. Distribution: Where and how will the commander position their force?
4. Determination: The will to fight, the will to persevere, and the will to win must be maintained.
5. Surprise (Demoralisation of Force): The commander's ability to veil their intentions while discovering those of their enemy. Properly executed Surprise unbalances the enemy – causing Demoralisation of Force.
6. Endurance: The force's resistance to pressure. This is measured by the force's ability to anticipate complications and threats. This is enhanced by planning on how best to avoid, overcome, or negate them and then properly educating and training the force in these methods.
7. Mobility: The commander's ability to manoeuvre their force while outmanoeuvring the enemy's forces.
8. Offensive Action (Disorganisation of Force): The ability to gain and maintain the initiative in combat. Properly executed Offensive Action disrupts the enemy - causing Disorganisation of Force.
9. Security: The ability to protect the force from threats.

==== Triads and Trichotomies ====
Cabalistic influences on his theories can be shown by his use of the "Law of Threes" throughout his work. Fuller did not believe the Principles stood alone as is thought today, but that they complemented and overlapped each other as part of a whole, forming the Law of Economy of Force.

==== Organisation of Force ====
These Principles were further grouped into the categories of Control (command / co-operation), Pressure (attack / activity) and Resistance (protection / stability). The Principles of Control guides the dual Principles of Pressure and of Resistance, which in turn create the Principles of Control.

- Principles of Control (1, 4, & 7): Direction, Determination, & Mobility.
- Principles of Pressure (2, 5, & 8): Concentration, Surprise, & Offensive Action.
- Principles of Resistance (3, 6, & 9): Distribution, Endurance, & Security.

==== The Unity of the Principles of War ====
They were also grouped into Cosmic (Spiritual), Mental (Mind / Thought / Reason), Moral (Soul / Sensations / Emotions), and Physical (Body / Musculature / Action) Spheres, in which two Principles (like the double-edged point of an arrowhead) combine to create or manifest a third, which in turn guides the first and second Principles (like the fletches on an arrow's tail). Each Sphere leads to the creation of the next until it returns to the beginning and repeats the circular cycle with reassessments of the Object and Objective to redefine the uses of Force. The Cosmic Sphere is seen as outside the other three Spheres, like the Heavens are outside the Realm of Man. They influence it indirectly in ways that cannot be controlled by the commander, but they are a factor in the use of Force. Force resides in the center of the pattern, as all of these elements revolve around it.

- Cosmic Sphere: Goal (Object) & Desire (Objective) = Method (Economy of Force)
  - Goal is the overall purpose or aim of the mission (what Goals must the mission complete or achieve?).
  - Desire concerns the priority of the achievement or acquisition of the Goal (how important and essential is the Goal to the overall mission effort?).
  - Method is how the forces available will carry out the mission (How much of the mission's force will be assigned - or are available – to accomplish the Goal?).
- Mental Sphere (1, 2, & 3): Reason (Direction) & Imagination (Concentration) = Will (Distribution)
- Moral Sphere (4, 5, & 6): Fear (Determination) & Morale (Surprise) = Courage (Endurance)
- Physical Sphere (7, 8, & 9): Attack (Offensive Action) & Protection (Security) = Movement (Mobility)

These Principles of War have been adopted and further refined by the military forces of several nations, most notably within NATO, and continue to be applied widely to modern strategic thinking. Recently they have also been applied to business tactics and hobby wargaming.

=== Lectures on Field Service Regulations III (1932) ===
Fuller also had a knack for aphorisms, witness: "To attack the nerves of an army, and through its nerves the will of its commander, is more profitable than battering to pieces the bodies of its men." His Lectures have attracted much attention over the course of decades, with one staff writer even going so far as to extend his vision of the tank as "master-weapon" to say that the helicopter not the tank would be the chief determinant of success on the battlefield from the late 20th century.

The book was carefully read by General Heinz Guderian of later Blitzkrieg fame and at the time Germany's foremost tank expert. The Soviet Army initially issued 30,000 copies of it and designated it as a table book for all Red Army officers. Later, the Soviets increased publication to 100,000 volumes. In Czechoslovakia, it became the standard reference for the teaching of mechanized warfare at their staff college. Ironically, in Britain only 500 copies were sold by 1935 while in the United States, the Infantry Journal received a copy at the time of publishing but failed to review it.

=== Armament and History (1945) ===
Fuller also developed the idea of the Constant Tactical Factor. This states that every improvement in warfare is checked by a counter-improvement, causing the advantage to shift back and forth between the offensive and the defensive. Fuller's firsthand experience in the First World War saw a shift from the defensive power of the machine gun to the offensive power of the tank.

== Magic and mysticism ==
Fuller had an occultist side that oddly mixed with his military side. He was an early disciple of English poet and magician Aleister Crowley, and was very familiar with his and other forms of magick and mysticism. He befriended Crowley in 1906 and introduced Crowley's principal disciple Victor Neuburg to him in the same year. While serving in the First Oxfordshire Light Infantry he had entered and won a contest to write the best review of Crowley's poetic works, after which it turned out that he was the only entrant. This essay was later published in book form in 1907 as The Star in the West. After this he became an enthusiastic supporter of Crowley, joining his magical order, the A∴A∴., within which he became a leading member, editing order documents and its journal, The Equinox. During this period he wrote The Treasure House of Images, edited early sections of Crowley's magical autobiography The Temple of Solomon the King and produced highly regarded paintings dealing with A∴A∴ teachings: these paintings have been used in recent years as the covers of the journal's revival, The Equinox, Volume IV.

After the April 1911 Jones vs. The Looking Glass case, in which a great deal was made of Aleister Crowley's bisexuality (although Crowley himself was not a party to the case), Fuller became worried that his association with Crowley might be a hindrance to his career. Crowley writes in chapter 67 of his book, The Confessions of Aleister Crowley:

...to my breathless amazement he fired pointblank at my head a document in which he agreed to continue his co-operation on condition that I refrain from mentioning his name in public or private under penalty of paying him a hundred pounds for each such offence. I sat down and poured in a broadside at close quarters.

"My dear man," I said in effect, "do recover your sense of proportion, to say nothing of your sense of humour. Your contribution, indeed! I can do in two days what takes you six months, and my real reason for ever printing your work at all is my friendship for you. I wanted to give you a leg up the literary ladder. I have taken endless pain to teach you the first principles of writing. When I met you, you were not so much as a fifth-rate journalist, and now you can write quite good prose with no more than my blue pencil through two out of every three adjectives, and five out of every six commas. Another three years with me and I will make you a master, but please don't think that either I or the Work depend on you, any more than J.P. Morgan depends on his favourite clerk."

After this, contact between the two men faded rapidly. The front pages of the 1913 issues of the Equinox (Volume 1, nos. 9 and 10), which gave general directions to A∴A∴ members, included a notice on the subject of Fuller, who was described as a "former Probationer"; the notice disparaged Fuller's magical accomplishments and warned A∴A∴ members to accept no magical training from him. However, Fuller continued to be fascinated with occult subjects and in later years he would write about topics such as the Qabalah and yoga. During the mid-1940s, Charles Richard Cammell (author of Aleister Crowley: The Man, The Mage, The Poet) met with Fuller and reported his views about Crowley: "I have heard an eminent personage, General J.F.C. Fuller, a man famous in arms and letters, one who has known the greatest statesmen, warriors, dictators, of our age, declare solemnly that the most extraordinary genius he ever knew was Crowley." After the Second World War and Crowley's death, Fuller wrote a letter to Edward Noel FitzGerald stating: "Crowley was a genuine avatar, but I don't think he knew it, but I do think he senses it in an emotional way." (17 September 1949)

== Works ==
Fuller was a prolific writer and published more than 45 books.

Books on Warfare

- Tanks in the Great War, 1914-1918 (New York: E.P. Dutton and Company, 1920) read online
- The Reformation of War (London: Hutchinson and Company, 1923) read online
- The Foundations of the Science of War. (London: Hutchinson and Company, 1926) read online
- On Future Warfare (London: Sifton, Praed & Company, 1928)
- India in Revolt (London: Eyre & Spottiswood, 1931) read online
- The Dragon's Teeth: A Study of War and Peace (London: Constable and Company, 1932) read online
- Lectures on Field Service Regulations III (1932) analysis
- The First of the League Wars: A Study of the Abyssinian War, Its Lessons and Omens (London: Eyre and Spottiswoode, 1936) read online (the book makes the claim that Bolshevism was Jewish
- Generalship: Its Diseases and Their Cure: A Study of the Personal Factor in Command (Harrisburg, Pennsylvania: Military Service Publishing Company, 1936) read online
- Decisive Battles: Their Influence upon History and Civilisation (New York: Charles Scribner's Sons, 1940, 1060 p.)
- Machine Warfare: An Enquiry into the Influence of Mechanics on the Art of War (London: Hutchinson, 1942)
- Warfare Today; How Modern Battles are Planned and Fought on Land, at Sea, and in the Air - joint editors: J.F.C. Fuller, Admiral Sir Reginald Bacon, and Air Marshal Sir Patrick Playfair (London: Odham's Press Ltd., 1944) read online
- Armament and History: The Influence of Armament on History from the Dawn of Classical Warfare to the End of the Second World War (London: Charles Scribner's Sons, 1945)
- The Second World War, 1939-1945: A Strategical and Tactical History (London: Eyre & Spottiswoode, 1948)
- The Decisive Battles of the Western World and Their Influence upon History (3 vols.) (London: Eyre & Spottiswoode, 1954–1956); it is - as described in its preface - a substantial revision of the 1940 edition. The U.S. ed. is A Military History of the Western World (3 vols.) (New York: Funk and Wagnalls, 1954–1957; republished by New York: Da Capo Press, 1987–8). A 2-volume edition, abridged by John Terraine to omit battles outside the European continent, was published in 1970 by Picador.
  - Volume 1: From the Earliest Times to the Battle of Lepanto
  - Volume 2: From the Defeat of the Spanish Armada to the Battle of Waterloo
  - Volume 3: From the American Civil War to the End of the Second World War
- The Conduct of War, 1789-1961: A Study of the Impact of the French, Industrial, and Russian Revolutions on War and Its Conduct (Rutgers University Press, 1961)
  - v. 1; ISBN 0-306-80304-6.
  - v. 2; ISBN 0-306-80305-4.
  - v. 3; ISBN 0-306-80306-2.

Biography

- The Generalship of Ulysses S. Grant (London: John Murray, 1929)
- Grant & Lee: A Study in Personality and Generalship (London: Eyre & Spottiswoode, 1933) read online
- Memoirs of an Unconventional Soldier (London: Nicholson & Watson, 1936) read online
- The Generalship of Alexander the Great (London: Eyre & Spottiswoode, 1958).
- Julius Caesar: Man, Soldier and Tyrant (London: Eyre & Spottiswoode, 1965)
- Fuller, J. F. C.; Aleister Crowley (1994). The Pathworkings of Aleister Crowley: The Treasure House of Images. James Wasserman (ed.). New Falcon Publications, U.S. ISBN 978-1-56184-074-8.

Books on Occultism

- The Star in The West: A Critical Essay Upon the Works of Aleister Crowley (London: Walter Scott Publishing Co., 1907) read online
- Yoga: A Study of the Mystical Philosophy of the Brahmins and Buddhists (London: W. Rider, 1925)
- Atlantis, America and the Future. (London: Kegan Paul, 1925)
- Pegasus (New York: E.P. Dutton and Company, 1926)
- The Secret Wisdom of the Qabalah: A Study in Jewish Mystical Thought (London: W. Rider & Co., 1937) read online
