= List of English-language broadcasters for Nazi Germany =

Rundfunkhaus was a radio station based in Berlin. It was used for broadcasting Nazi propaganda by the Ministry of Propaganda.

Broadcasters included:

Name	Previous Occupation	Details	Prosecution	Alias/ Pseudonym/ Nickname
John Amery	film producer		Death sentence at the Central Criminal Court for high treason, executed December 1945	
Norman Baillie-Stewart	soldier (former) - subaltern in the Seaforth Highlanders		Five years' penal servitude at the Central Criminal Court for offences under the Defence Regulations	"Sinister Sam" (possibly)
Leonard Banning	teacher in Germany at the outbreak of war		Ten years	"John Brown" and "William Brown"
Margaret Frances Bothamley	"member of the Ealing Branch of the pre-war pro-Nazi group The Link	'She ... stayed [in Germany in September 1939], broadcasting Nazi propaganda alongside William Joyce.'	'She was tried in March 1946 but, unlike Joyce, she was only handed down a year's imprisonment. Depositions - CRIM 1/1763	
Edward Salvin Bowlby	Living in Budapest at the outbreak of war, where he hoped to start at language school	Home Office file HO 45/25789 Dominions Office file - DO 130/74	Not prosecuted - partly because he had been born in Ireland	Broadcast under his own name
Elsa Gertrude Brietzmann	Dual national - British and German - lived in Germany from 1923		Bound over for two years at the Central Criminal Court; Depositions - CRIM 1/1764	
Arthur Chapple	soldier - Sergeant in the Royal Army Service Corps - mobilised Navy, Army and Air Force Institutes manager.	One of a group of 'Service renegades [who had] been employed in editing, writing scripts, and broadcasting for the enemy, and in certain cases the same men [were] also employed in journalism. The National Archives Security Service file KV 2/443	15 years' imprisonment, which was later reduced to 10 years National Archives Court-martial papers - WO 71/1133	"Lang"
James Clarke	schoolboy		Bound over for two years at the Central Criminal Court for offences under the Defence Regulations; Depositions - CRIM 1/1736	
William Colledge alias Winter	soldier - member of the North Somerset Yeomanry	'continued to broadcast until 1943.' Special Investigation Branch, Royal Air Force - Statement of Activities	National Archives Court-martial papers - WO 71/1131 - penal servitude for life	"Winter"
Roderick Anton Eduard Dietze	broadcaster born in Glasgow of a mixed German-British-Hungarian family background, - "son of a German father and Scottish mother ... in the early 1930s he became the BBC's commentator in Berlin"	The National Archives Security Service file KV 2/428	"in view of his nationality, it was decided not to prosecute him as a renegade"	
Patrick Joseph Dillon	Merchant Seaman - Fireman on SS Brisbane - "taken prisoner in 1940 after his ship was sunk"	Home Office file - HO 45/25815; The National Archives Security Service files KV 2/434 - 436 -	Ten years' penal servitude at the Central Criminal Court for offences under the Defence Regulations Depositions - CRIM 1/1732	"Patrick Callaghan"
Frances Dorothy Eckersley	wife of Edward Clark		One year's hard labour at the Central Criminal Court for offences under the Defence Regulations; Depositions - CRIM 1/1736	
Benson Railton Metcalf Freeman	RAF flying officer - No. 16 Squadron RAF	Also served in the SS-Standarte Kurt Eggers The National Archives Security Service file KV 2/631	Ten years penal servitude and cashiered National Archives Court-martial papers - AIR 18/27	N/A - scriptwriter
Charles Patrick Gilbert	Moved to Germany from the Channel Islands in 1940	Home Office - HO 45/25833 The National Archives Security Service file KV 2/442	Nine months' prison sentence - Depositions - CRIM 1/1783	"Kenneth James"
Donald Alexander Fraser Grant	travelling salesman - on an exchange trip when war broke out	The National Archives Security Service file KV 2/424 - 425	Six months imprisonment - Depositions - CRIM 1/1833	"Derrick Grant", "Donald Palmer", "Jock Palmer", et al., as well as his own name "Donald Grant"; dubbed: "Scotland's Lord Haw-Haw"
William Humphrey Griffiths	soldier - Guardsman in the Welsh Guards	One of a group of 'Service renegades [who had] been employed in editing, writing scripts, and broadcasting for the enemy, and in certain cases the same men [were] also employed in journalism.	Seven years penal servitude National Archives Court-martial papers - WO 71/1110	
Gerald Percy Sandys Hewitt	teacher of languages	a British citizen who lived most of his life in Paris and had been associated with Action Française. The National Archives Security Service file KV 2/426 - 427	Twelve years penal servitude at the Central Criminal Court for offences under the Defence Regulations Depositions - CRIM 1/1658	"Smith"
Susan Dorothea Mary Therese Hilton	"member pre-war of the British Union of Fascists, she was twice shipwrecked before detention in France in Autumn, 1940." Possibly the 'Plain Lady' captured by the German commerce raider Atlantis when it sank the passenger ship Kemmendine. Ulrich More, first officer of the Atlantis, says that after she had left the ship the crew learned that she was Irish and worked with William Joyce. The second shipwreck would be the Norwegian Tirranna, a prize of Atlantis, sunk by the British submarine HMS Tuna while carrying Kemmendine's passengers and crew to German-occupied Europe.	Worked in Irland-Redaktion. The National Archives Security Service file KV 2/423 - "Soon released, she worked for the German propaganda service as a broadcaster and scriptwriter until 1943, when she moved to Austria. Interned in August 1944 at her own request"	18 months' imprisonment for aiding the enemy Depositions - CRIM 1/1745	
Cyril Charles Hoskins	soldier - King's Royal Rifle Corps	The principal speaker and writer of the 'Christian Peace Movement'. This purported to be the output of an underground organization of pacifists agitating against British involvement in an immoral war.		
Raymond Davies Hughes	RAF warrant officer - Air gunner	"he was shot down over Germany and imprisoned. He aided the enemy in various ways including broadcasting propaganda." - see The National Archives Security Service files KV 2/262 and KV 2/263National Archives - German documents - AIR 40/2298	"In 1945 he was court martialled, sentenced to 5 years imprisonment and reduced to the ranks." National Archives Court-martial papers - AIR 18/26	"John Baker", "George Becker", "Raymond Sharples"
Reginald Arthur Humphries	teacher in Germany at the outbreak of war (according to his The National Archives Security Service file) or seaman on HMS Royal Arthur (shore establishment), Skegness	"he was interned and made broadcasts from Germany from 1943 onwards under the names, 'Father Donovan' and 'Jeffries'." - see The National Archives Security Service file KV 2/258 and Home Office file HO 45/25796	Five years' penal servitude at the Central Criminal Court for offences under the Defence Regulations Depositions - CRIM 1/1739	"Father Donovan"
Lewis Barrington (Barry) Payne Jones		See An Illustrated Dictionary of the Third Reich, by Jean-Denis G.G. Lepage, P 141 Home Office file HO 45/25786 The National Archives Security Service files KV 2/632 to 633	"After his arrest in April 1945 he claimed to have adopted German nationality in 1939 and he was therefore not prosecuted"	
Margaret Joyce	Wife of William Joyce	The National Archives Security Service file KV 2/253	Not prosecuted - naturalised as a German citizen in 1940	Broadcast under her real name from 1942
William Joyce	Director of Propaganda of the British Union of Fascists		Death sentence at the Central Criminal Court for high treason, executed January 1946	"Lord Haw-Haw"
Kenneth Vincent Lander	teacher at Hermann Lietz Schule, Schloss Bieberstein, near Fulda, Germany at the outbreak of war	Home Office file - HO 45/25827 - broadcast for the New British Broadcasting Service	'Let go with a warning as to [his] future conduct.	
John Lingshaw	Salvation Army social worker on Jersey		Five years' penal servitude at the Central Criminal Court for offences under the Defence Regulations Depositions - CRIM 1/1759	
Francis Paul Maton	soldier - Corporal in the Royal Artillery	The National Archives Security Service file KV 2/264	Court martialled in 1945, he was sentenced to 10 years imprisonment for voluntarily aiding the enemy. National Archives Court-martial papers - WO 71/1117	
Martin James Monti	United States Army Air Force pilot		25 years in prison at Leavenworth Penitentiary for treason. - paroled in 1960	
Professor de:Ludwig Mühlhausen	Professor of Celtic languages at Frederick William University, Berlin			
Liam Mullally			Not prosecuted - Irish citizen	
John O'Reilly	Irish seasonal worker stranded on Jersey	Irish section of German radio - Irland-Redaktion	Taken into Garda Síochána custody on 17 December 1943 - 'effectively interned' ...in the military prison at Arbour Hill in Dublin ... until the end of the war	"Pat O'Brien", then under his own name
William James Edward Percival	Air correspondent - travelled to Berlin and Cologne in late August 1939 to write on German aviation industry	The National Archives Security Service file KV 2/429 - Home Office file - HO 45/25781		
Ralph Powell	Teacher (language) in the Netherlands	Translator and newsreader in the German Foreign Ministry	Not prosecuted - "claimed that he was forced to work for the Nazis by threats of reprisals against his German wife's family"	
Suzanne Louise Provost-Booth	Was living in France when it was overrun by the Germans in 1940	Home Office file - HO 45/25806		"Mrs Evans"
Roy Walter Purdy	Merchant Navy officer, serving as a sub lieutenant in the Royal Navy on an emergency commission	propaganda broadcaster and informer at Colditz "reprieved on the grounds that [he] had been [a follower] in treason rather than [a leader] ... released from prison ... in December 1954" - died in 1982. Security Service files on him are held by the National Archives under references KV 2/259 to KV 2/261.	Death sentence at the Central Criminal Court for high treason Depositions - CRIM 1/1738 (1946) 10 JCL 182 - reprieved Central Criminal Court- Pardon - released 1954	"Pointer"
Ronald Spillman	soldier - lance-corporal	One of a group of 'Service renegades [who had] been employed in editing, writing scripts, and broadcasting for the enemy, and in certain cases the same men [were] also employed in journalism. The National Archives Security Service files KV 2/437 to KV 2/438	Seven years penal servitude National Archives Court-martial papers - WO 71/1112	
Vivian Stranders	RAF Captain (permission to retain rank withdrawn, 1933) previously Lieutenant, Kent Fortress Royal Engineers, (deprived of rank of lieutenant, 1933)	"broadcast on the English Section"	Not prosecuted - had been naturalized as a German citizen in 1933	
Francis Stuart	Lecturer in English and Irish literature at Berlin University		Not prosecuted - Irish citizen	
Jack Trevor (né Anthony Cedric Sebastian Steane)	actor	R v Steane; The National Archives Security Service files KV 2/622 to 624	Three years' imprisonment but the sentence was quashed on appeal as he was held to be acting under duress.	
Pearl Vardon	teacher on Jersey		Nine months imprisonment at the Central Criminal Court for offences under the Defence Regulations - Depositions - CRIM 1/1761	
John Alexander Ward	translator in Frankfurt	Home Office file HO 45/25826 - 'employed in various duties by German radio' "gave 'defeatist' talks"		"Private Donald Hodgson" of 3rd Battalion, the Gloucestershire Regiment (his former army unit).
Henry William Wicks		"[H]e went to Germany with his family in 1939 before war was declared and refused to return. Interned from July 1940 to November 1942, he was released and worked for German Radio in 1943-1944." - see The National Archives Security Service files KV 2/418 to KV 2/422.	"Sentenced in 1945 to four years' imprisonment for acts likely to assist the enemy, his appeal against conviction and sentence was dismissed." - Depositions - CRIM 1/1767	
P. G. Wodehouse	author		Not prosecuted	Broadcast under his own name
Edward Vieth Sittler	Educator		Not prosecuted (renounced US citizenship in 1939 on his naturalisation as a German citizen. Returned to the US post-war as a witness for the US Justice Department. Twice deported and failed to regain US citizenship.	
Charles Veith Sittler	Educator		Not prosecuted although, unlike, brother Edward Vieth Sittler, he had never renounced his US Citizenship. Also returned to the US by the Justice Department as a witness (arrived in the United States at Westover Field on the 18 January 1949, on a military flight via the Azores with Egidius A. Houben, both as Government witnesses destined for the United States Attorney's office in the Federal Building at Brooklyn, New York City). Remained in the US, employed by the University of Chicago in 1960 where another brother, Joseph Sittler, was also employed.	

== See also ==
- Büro Concordia
