= Dorothy O'Grady =

British woman found guilty of treachery in World War II

Dorothy Pamela O’Grady
- Born: 25 October 1897; Clapham, London, England
- Died: 11 October 1985 (aged 87); Lake, Isle of Wight, England
- Other name: Pamela Arland
- Occupation: Boarding housekeeper
- Known for: Nazi saboteur
- Spouse: Vincent O'Grady (m. 1926; died 1953)
- Status: Deceased
- Convictions: Treachery; Violating the Official Secrets Act (2 counts); Theft
- Penalty: Death; commuted to 14 years imprisonment

Dorothy Pamela O'Grady (25 October 1897 – 11 October 1985) was the first British woman to be found guilty of treachery in World War II. She was sentenced to death but on appeal the sentence was commuted to 14 years' penal servitude.

== Biography ==
O'Grady was adopted soon after birth by a British Museum official, George Squire. Her mother died when she was 11 and her father then married his housekeeper who treated her in a vindictive manner. By the age of 13, she was living in a home where young girls were trained for domestic service. In 1918, she was convicted of forging bank-notes and in 1920, while in service in Brighton, she was found guilty of stealing clothing and was sentenced to two years' penal servitude. On her release, she moved back to London where she worked as a prostitute until 1926 when she married a London fireman 19 years older than her, Vincent O'Grady. On his retirement, they moved to Sandown on the Isle of Wight where she ran a boarding house, Osborne Villa. On the outbreak of war in 1939 he was recalled to the London Fire Brigade for wartime service leaving O'Grady behind.

== Wartime activities ==
The Isle of Wight is immediately opposite France across the English Channel and commands the Solent which is the sea approach to the major ports of Southampton and Britain’s biggest naval base, Portsmouth. Its strategically important coastline was subject to strict restrictions on movement throughout World War II.

With her husband away on war service, O'Grady was seen frequenting restricted coastal areas while walking her dog, sometimes at night. Her activities were monitored and her mail intercepted and she was found to be making drawings and detailed maps of the coast. She was then caught in the act of cutting some telegraph wires and arrested.

== Trials ==
In August 1940, O'Grady was charged with being in a prohibited area and granted bail. But when she failed to attend the court hearing at Ryde Magistrate’s Court her home was searched and she was eventually apprehended living under the assumed name of Pamela Arland in a boarding house at Totland Bay on the west coast of the island.

In December 1940, the case against her was heard in camera at the Hampshire Assizes, Winchester. As there was no indication as to just how the information gathered by O'Grady was to have been communicated to the Germans she was tried not as a spy or agent, but as a saboteur.

On 17 December 1940, O'Grady was found guilty of two offences under the Treachery Act; of making a plan likely to assist the enemy and that with intent to help the enemy she cut a military telephone wire. She was also found guilty of two offences under the Official Secrets Act; that she had approached a prohibited place and that she had made a plan that might be useful to the enemy.

O'Grady received the death sentence mandated under law. Her subsequent appeal was heard in the Court of Appeal in London in February 1941, and on 10 February 1941, the sentence was commuted to fourteen years’ penal servitude.

== Prison and release ==
On conviction, O'Grady was moved from Holloway Prison to serve her sentence at Aylesbury Prison, Buckinghamshire. There she was examined by the prison psychologist who found she had an IQ of 140, but that she was also mentally disturbed exhibiting a range of masochistic behaviours.

O'Grady served 9 years of her sentence and was released in early 1950. She then sought to give her account of events and in an interview with Sidney Rodin, a reporter for the Sunday Express, she asserted that the whole episode "was a huge joke" and that "being sentenced to death gave her the biggest thrill in her life".

== Subsequent life ==
O'Grady returned to her home at Sandown where she resumed her life as a boarding house keeper. Her husband died in 1953 and in 1969 she went to live in a residential home at Lake on the Isle of Wight, where she remained until her death in 1985.

== Declassified files ==
The papers for the wartime prosecution were released by the National Archives in 1995 under reference HO 45/25408. These disclosed that the maps O'Grady had drawn of the Isle of Wight’s coastal defences were accurate and would have been of great assistance to any German attack on the island. Unknown at the time, as part of Operation Sea Lion, the Germans intended to invade the island with an assault by the Wehrmacht’s 9.Armee under Generaloberst Adolf Strauss.

In 2010 it transpired that the National Archives file was no longer available, "misplaced when on loan to government department". Two other files on the case (PCOM9/1497 and PCOM9/1497/1) can be viewed by appointment at the National Archives. There is also readily available news coverage from the time via the British Newspaper Archives.

== See also ==
- Leonard Banning
- Norah Briscoe
- Gertrude Hiscox
- Tyler Kent
- John Lingshaw
- Pearl Vardon
- Anna Wolkoff
