= Right Club =

British far-right antisemitic organisation

The Right Club was a small group of antisemitic and fascist-sympathising renegades within the British establishment formed a few months before World War II by the Scottish Unionist MP Archibald Maule Ramsay. It was focused on opposition to war with Germany up to and including by acts of treason. Many of its members were imprisoned for the duration of the war. Members of the group were implicated in two plots to launch a coup when Germany landed in Britain.

== Formation ==
The group was formed in May 1939, when Ramsay decided that the Conservative Party needed to rid itself of perceived Jewish control. Ramsay, in describing the Right Club, boasted that "The main objective was to oppose and expose the activities of organised Jewry". Its first objective "was to clear the Conservative Party of Jewish influence.

"The aim of the Club is to co-ordinate the activities of all the patriotic bodies which are striving to free this country from the Jewish domination in the financial, political, philosophical and cultural sphere. The organisations in question are such as the following: British Union, Nordic League, National Socialist League, Imperial Fascists, The Link, Liberty Restoration League and a few others."

Ramsay kept a record of those who had joined in a red leather-bound and lockable ledger (the "Red Book"). There were 135 names on the men's list and 100 on a separate ladies' list; the members of the Right Club included many known to be antisemitic (including William Joyce and MP John Hamilton Mackie), those who were in some respects "fellow travellers" with antisemitism, and some friends of Ramsay who may have joined without knowing the actual functions of the club.

At its early meetings, The 5th Duke of Wellington took the chair. Other members included Lord Redesdale, Lord Lymington, Arnold Leese, A. K. Chesterton, and George Henry Drummond (father-in-law of John Astor). The 2nd Duke of Westminster was also a supporter.

The motto of the Right Club was "Perish Judah" and the logo, seen on its badge, was of an eagle killing a snake with the initials "P.J."

While Ramsay was attempting to launch the Right Club, he spoke at a meeting of the Nordic League at the Wigmore Hall at which a reporter from the Daily Worker was present and reported Ramsay as saying that they needed to end Jewish control, "and if we don't do it constitutionally, we'll do it with steel"; a statement greeted with wild applause. The magazine John Bull picked up on the report and challenged Ramsay to contradict it or explain himself. Ramsay's local constituency newspaper, the Peeblesshire Advertiser, made the same challenge and Ramsay responded by admitting he had made the speech, citing the fact that three halls had refused to host the meeting as evidence of Jewish control.

== Outbreak of war ==
Privately, Ramsay had been invited to some of the "Secret Meetings" at which right-wing opponents of the war discussed tactics. However, after they grew to be dominated by Oswald Mosley and his supporters, Ramsay withdrew. The Right Club spent the Phoney War period distributing propaganda in the form of leaflets and "sticky-backs" (adhesive labels bearing slogans), with Ramsay later explaining that he wanted "to maintain the atmosphere in which the Phoney War, as it was called, might be converted into an honourable negotiated peace." Sticky-backs were printed to disseminate the frequencies used by the New British Broadcasting Station, a Nazi propaganda radio station broadcasting from Germany, which claimed to counter the "Jewish lies" of the British Broadcasting Corporation and promoted active resistance to the War as a Jewish plot. On 20 March 1940, Ramsay used a Parliamentary Question to set out the times and frequency of the nightly NBBS broadcasts under Parliamentary privilege. In addition to Ramsay's "Land of dope and Jewry" rhyme, the slogans included "War destroys workers" and "This is a Jews' War"; some of the leaflets asserted "the stark truth is that this war was plotted and engineered by the Jews for world-power and vengeance".

MI5 uncovered two fascist plots that involved members of the Right Club, all of which would've taken place when German troops landed in Britain, including one planned by Ramsay himself. The most militarily advanced coup, organized by Leigh Vaughan-Henry, who was not a member of the Right Club, reported to have already organized 18 cells of 25 members each for the coup. Among those named as potential participants retired general J. F. C. Fuller and retired admiral Barry Domvile. Also implicated, but not conclusively, was General Edmund Ironside, then Chief of the Imperial General Staff and about to be named commander-in-chief of the Home Guard. Fuller, a close friend of Ironside, told Domvile that "Ironside is with us."

== End of the club ==
One of the last members to join the Right Club was Tyler Kent, a cypher clerk at the American Embassy in London. Ramsay gave Kent, who had diplomatic immunity due to his job, the ledger containing the pre-war list of Right Club members for safe-keeping. Kent was stealing top-secret documents from the embassy, and Ramsay hoped to leak sensitive correspondence between Churchill and Roosevelt with the intention of discouraging US support for Britain in the war. Unknown to the conspirators they had already fallen under suspicion, and several active members of the Right Club were MI5 operatives. On 20 May, Kent's flat was raided and he was arrested; the locked 'Red Book' was forced open. Ramsay's involvement with Kent was extremely concerning to the authorities as Ramsay enjoyed Parliamentary privilege: Kent was passing the stolen documents to Ramsay, and if not intercepted it would have been impossible to prevent their publication.

The Cabinet decided to extend Defence Regulation 18B to give more power to detain people suspected of disloyalty. Ramsay was arrested and lodged in Brixton Prison on an order under Regulation 18B on 23 May 1940, and many other Right Club members were detained. This ended Ramsay's plans for a coup.
