= John Lingshaw =

British Nazi collaborator

John George Lingshaw (4 September 1909 – 1975) was a British collaborator who worked in Germany on Nazi propaganda during World War II. In 1946, he was convicted of offences under the Defence Regulations and sentenced to five years penal servitude.

== Biography ==
John Lingshaw was the son of George and Marie Lingshaw of Saint John, Jersey, and a member of the Jersey Island Salvation Army.

== Internment ==
Jersey fell under the German occupation of the Channel Islands on 30 June 1940.

In 1942, Hitler ordered the deportation from the Channel Islands of all those not born there or who had served in the British armed forces. This was in retaliation for the internment of German nationals in Iran following the Anglo-Soviet invasion in 1941.

As Lingshaw had joined the part-time Royal Militia of the Island of Jersey on 31 August 1929, he was subject to this order.

He was sentenced on 15 August 1942 to deportation by the German Feldkommandantur and on 13 February 1943, Lingshaw was in the group of Channel Island detainees deported to the internment camp at Oflag VII-C, Laufen, Bavaria.

== Collaboration ==
While interned, Lingshaw decided to collaborate with the Nazis and, on 16 August 1943, he was released to travel to Berlin where he was employed to teach English to a group of 15 women working in the German propaganda service. He worked on minor duties for the New British Broadcasting Station unit of the Reichs-Rundfunk-Gesellschaft, German State Radio, monitoring and recording the BBC's wartime news bulletins.

In 1944, Lingshaw appears to have fallen out with the NBBS as on 11 November 1944 he was sent back to internment, this time to Oflag V-B at Biberach, Bavaria, where he remained until 23 April 1945 when the camp was liberated by the French Army. Along with all other interned Channel Islanders, Lingshaw was repatriated to RAF Hendon, not to the Channel Islands, and there his wartime collaboration became known.

== Trial ==
Lingshaw was committed for trial on 6 February 1946 at a hearing at Bow Street Magistrates' Court in London, where he was charged with aiding the enemy by monitoring radio broadcasts.

At his following trial at the Old Bailey on 1 March 1946, he admitted to having assisted in the production and recording of British news bulletins for the German State Radio and was sentenced to five years' penal servitude.

== Later life ==
On his release, Lingshaw lived in Sheffield where he married in 1961. There he was occupied as a boarding house keeper and as a licensed hawker. His business activities appear to have been unsuccessful. He petitioned for bankruptcy in September 1959 and this was not discharged until May 1969.

He died in Sheffield in 1975.

== See also ==
- Leonard Banning
- Norah Briscoe
- Gertrude Hiscox
- Tyler Kent
- Dorothy O'Grady
- Pearl Vardon
- Anna Wolkoff
