= Bryan Clough =

English writer (born 1932)

Bryan Clough (born 1932, Oldham, Lancashire) is an English writer.

Clough has written several books and articles dealing with phreakers, hackers and computer virus writers; credit card fraud; banking; and the activities of MI5 during World War II, specifically the Tyler Kent–Anna Wolkoff Affair (2005).

== Works ==
In 1990, Clough and Paul Mungo, a journalist, wrote Approaching Zero (1992) a book that covered the activities of phreakers, hackers and computer virus writers. It was later published in North America and translations appeared in French, Spanish, Turkish and Japanese.

Three incidents of credit card fraud described in the book resulted in much interest in the press. Further investigations resulted in articles on computer viruses, and investigations into 'phantom withdrawals' from ATMs and credit card fraud.

These investigations culminated in the publication of Cheating at Cards (1994) which revealed 40 ways of fraudulently obtaining money from ATMs; and Beware of Your Bank (1995) in which he examined mistakes made by banks and explained how to detect errors, and how to obtain compensation.

Sparked by a close interest in cryptology, he then turned to the strange case of Tyler Kent, an American national employed as a code and cipher clerk at the American Embassy in London, at a time when Great Britain was at war with Germany and America claimed to be strictly neutral. In May 1940, Kent was arrested, tried in camera and sentenced to seven years' penal servitude.

Clough's book State Secrets: The Kent–Wolkoff Affair (2005) took advantage of privileged access to Government files and also the release of others under the Freedom of Information Act. Sixty-five years after the event, Clough finally revealed the 'real reason' for Kent's arrest and imprisonment – which was very different from the earlier versions in officially inspired publications. Clough appeared in the documentary Churchill and the Fascist Plot broadcast on Channel Four on 16 March 2013.

== Personal life ==
Clough was educated at the Hulme Grammar School, Oldham and served his national service with the 10th Royal Hussars in Germany. He then worked in a variety of industries, mainly in engineering, before becoming chief executive for a major international company which allowed him to travel widely.

He set up his own computer supply and maintenance company in 1983 which he sold out in 1990 in order to concentrate on research and writing.

Clough married his wife in 1971 and they had two daughters. He now lives in Hove, Sussex.

== Bibliography ==
- Clough, Bryan. Mungo, Paul. Approaching Zero: Data Crime & the Computer Underworld Faber & Faber, London 1992. ISBN 0-571-16546-X
- Clough, Bryan. Mungo, Paul. Approaching Zero: The Extraordinary World of Hackers, Phreakers, Virus Writers and Keyboard Criminals Random House, New York 1992. ISBN 0-679-40938-6
- Clough, Bryan. Mungo, Paul. Los Piratas del Chip: La Mafia Informatica al Desnudo Ediciones B, Barcelona 1992. ISBN 84-406-3152-9
- Clough, Bryan. Mungo, Paul. Delinquance Assistée par Ordinateur: La Saga des "Hackers" Nouveaux Flibustiers "High Tech"! Dunod, Paris 1993. ISBN 2-10-002013-7
- Clough, Bryan. Mungo, Paul. Approaching Zero Hayakawa Publishing, Tokyo 1994
- Clough, Bryan. Mungo, Paul. Sıfıra Doğru İletişim Yayınları, Istanbul 1994. ISBN 975-470-496-1
- Clough, Bryan. Cheating at Cards – Plastic Fraud: Sharp Practices and Naïve Systems Hideaway Publications, Hove 1994. ISBN 0-907923-28-3
- Clough, Bryan. Beware of Your Bank Hideaway Publications, Hove 1995. ISBN 0-9525477-1-6
- Clough, Bryan. State Secrets: The Kent-Wolkoff Affair. East Sussex: Hideaway Publications Ltd., 2005. ISBN 0-9525477-3-2
