= Leonard Banning =

Leonard Banning (born 1910, date of death unknown) was a British broadcaster of Nazi propaganda during World War II. In 1946, he was convicted of offences under the Defence Regulations and sentenced to 10 years' penal servitude. He was born in St Albans, Hertfordshire.

== Biography ==
Banning was a British school teacher who became involved in the politics of the Right. He joined the Conservative Party and became an organiser with them. He subsequently joined the British Union of Fascists and was based at the party's headquarters in the King's Road, Chelsea, London. He was a contributor to The Blackshirt, the newspaper of the BUF.

In 1939 Banning left for Germany to teach English in Düsseldorf. On the outbreak of World War II he attempted to leave Germany but was detained by the Gestapo. When his pre-war membership of the BUF became known to them, however, he was not interned but was allowed to live openly and without civil restrictions in Berlin on condition that he worked as a radio broadcaster for the Germans. In early 1940 Banning began work for the "New British Broadcasting Service" unit of the Reichs-Rundfunk-Gesellschaft, German State Radio.

== Propaganda for Nazi Germany ==
Banning broadcast for the Germans from 1940 to 1945. Initially he worked for the German Büro Concordia organisation which from February 1940 operated several black propaganda radio stations, such as Radio National, staffed by collaborators and Nazi sympathisers who purported to be broadcasting from within wartime Britain.

Banning was initially enthusiastic in his work, being described by a colleague as "the driving force behind the NBBS". On air, he used the pseudonyms of John Brown and William Brown and at first he was allowed to be a free agent, with his Between Ourselves talks that he broadcast to his British audience being both scripted and read by himself. Later, this freedom was curtailed under pressure from the station controller, Doctor Erich Hetzler, and he was obliged to conform. Along with another British expatriate collaborator, however, Kenneth James Gilbert, Banning was involved in a serious fight with a number of SS guards in October 1942 for which Gilbert was sent to a labour camp for five months. On his return, Gilbert's haggard appearance was used by Hetzler as a dire warning to those broadcasters who failed to obey orders. The effect on Banning was profound and, by the end of his time with the NBBS, he was "disillusioned, in fear of his life, half mad and wasted away".

== Arrest and trial ==
Banning returned to Britain by air after the war and was arrested at Croydon Airport on 3 November 1945 and then charged at the Old Bailey with broadcasting enemy propaganda. Banning was found guilty at the Old Bailey on five out of seven counts of assisting the enemy by making propaganda records and broadcasting. He was sentenced on 22 January 1946 to 10 years’ penal servitude. British Security Service files on him are held by The National Archives under references KV 2/432 and KV 2/433. The depositions in his trial are held at the National Archives under reference CRIM 1/1735

== See also ==
- Norah Briscoe
- Gertrude Hiscox
- Tyler Kent
- John Lingshaw
- Dorothy O'Grady
- Pearl Vardon
- Anna Wolkoff
