= Vardon (surname) =

Vardon is a surname. Notable people with the surname include:

- Edward Vardon (1866–1937), Australian politician
- Harry Vardon (1870–1937), professional golfer
- Joseph Vardon (1843–1937), Australian politician
- Pearl Vardon (1915–unknown), British broadcaster of Nazi propaganda during World War II
- Philippe Vardon (1980), French far-right politician and activist
