= New British Broadcasting Station =

Nazi Germany propaganda radio station

The New British Broadcasting Station or NBBS was a covert German propaganda radio station, but largely purporting to be of a British origin.

== History ==
On 30 October 1939, a meeting of the Germans decided to have propaganda radio stations. The station was set up by Adolf Raskin, who later was killed in the 1940 Deutsche Lufthansa Ju 90 crash. Prof Adolf Mahr took part in some broadcasting, for Irish broadcasts.

The station began at Soorstrasse 33 in Berlin. Erich Metzler (15 January 1910 - ) moved to London in 1929 to study at the LSE, returning to Germany in May 1930. He took over the running of the station.

It also monitored the BBC, and broadcast propaganda by native English speakers, being where some British collaborators worked. The station invented stories, which the BBC believed at times; the BBC was required to have two sources for each story.

The station was featured in the 'Nazi Propaganda' episode of Secrets of War. Although the NBBS never typically descended into rudeness or coarse language, being largely unerringly polite until the end, the content of the broadcasts was not as pleasant as the delivery.

== Broadcasting ==
The station went on air on the evening of Sunday 25 February 1940 on 50.63 metres wavelength.

The station was discussed in the House of Commons on Wednesday 20 March 1940, Wednesday 3 April 1940, Thursday 25 April 1940, a discussion of posters on Wednesday 8 May 1940, and Thursday 9 May 1940.

Programmes opened with a signature tune, which was a concatenation of British folk tunes - Annie Laurie, Comin' Thro' the Rye, The Bonnie Banks o' Loch Lomond and Auld Lang Syne, not unlike the later Radio 4 UK Theme.

There were ninety minutes daily, and the station concluded broadcast with God Save the King; it was an intentional parody of the BBC Home Service. It broadcast at 9.30pm and 10.30pm, and 5.30pm and 9.30pm on Sundays.

In 1942 the station tried to imply that RAF raids were ineffective, and the RAF should 'only be for close support of the army'. The station ran topics such as a belief of international Jewish finance and continental Freemasonry were pursuing a policy of world domination, by wars and revolution. On Thursday 4 April 1940, it announced that it had set up the 'Institute of British Opinion'. In Britain there was also the British Institute of Public Opinion.

== Effect on British people ==
English regional newspapers sniggered at the many geographical and cultural faux-pas of the material being portrayed as from the UK.

== Convictions ==
Once the war had finished, anyone that was found to have willingly broadcast for the NBBS faced prosecution under the Defence Regulations and lengthy prison sentences. Many of those prosecuted claimed ignorance, but the prosecutors merely saw this as nothing more than attempted further lying, or obvious subterfuge.

- Lance Corporal Ronald Spillman, aged 24, of Mare Street in east London, captured at Crete, from February 1943, he read four news items a day for the NBBS; at his court martial at Chelsea Barracks, he received seven years.
- Leonard Banning, aged 37 he was prosecuted in court by Gerald Howard, receiving ten years.
- Charles Gilbert, born March 1917, he claimed to be a Dutchman working for the UN until caught by an intelligence officer, aged 29 he received nine months
- John Lingshaw, at his trial on 1 March 1946, he was sentenced to five years.

== See also ==
- List of English-language broadcasters for Nazi Germany
- List of Allied traitors during World War II
