= Leigh Vaughan-Henry =

British composer and far-right activist (1889-1958)

- Born: 23 September 1889; Liverpool, England, UK
- Died: 8 March 1958 (aged 68); London, England, UK
- Occupation: Composer
- Known for: Composer and far-right activist

Leigh Vaughan-Henry (full name: Leigh Francis Howell Wynne Sackville de Montmorency Vaughan-Henry, born 23 September 1889 – 8 March 1958) was a British musicologist, composer, antisemite and far-right activist who was interned during World War II after plotting a pro-Nazi coup.

== Biography ==
Vaughan-Henry received his earliest training from his Welsh father, John Henry, a singer and composer. He then studied with Granville Bantock in London, Ricardo Viñes in France, and Giuseppe Buonamici in Italy, where he became musical director at Edward Gordon Craig’s Theatrical School in Florence (1912). While living in Liverpool in 1911, he met and befriended Margaret Glyn from Ewell in Surrey, an enthusiastic musician who would later leave a bequest to Vaughan-Henry in her will.

=== World War I ===
While on a visit to Germany in 1914, he was interned during World War I at the Ruhleben internment camp near Spandau. He was active in creating a series of Shakespeare plays (including The Merry Wives of Windsor, As You Like It and Twelfth Night) and musical performances in the camp which was humane and well-run, and left him with an abiding respect for Germany. He reportedly escaped the camp in 1917, wearing a German corporal's uniform, in a laundry wagon.

According to The New York Times in 1931, after his internment, Vaughan-Henry served on the Italian front in a cavalry unit, being later decorated with the British Military Cross and the Italian War Star as well as being made a Cavaliere of the Crown of Italy. Before the war he had married a woman named Nancy, an Oxford University Press editor and a friend of author D. H. Lawrence. While escaping from Ruhleben in 1917, he smuggling out a volume of poetry, "Poems of a Prisoner", which Nancy hoped would find a publisher via Lawrence.

=== Inter-war years ===
Returning to England after World War I, Vaughan-Henry edited a modern music journal, Fanfare (1921–22). He had a strong interest in Welsh culture and claimed a druid heritage. He wrote stories, poems and music based on Welsh culture and performed at various eisteddfodau and was in 1923 received into the Gorsedd as a Bard at the Mold Eisteddfod. While interned in Germany, he had composed a one-man opera, The Moon Robber, which was performed in Liverpool in 1929.

By 1931 Henry was divorced from Nancy and had been working in the United States as the musical director of Edgewood School in Greenwich, Connecticut for two years. He was invited by Elizabeth Sprague Coolidge to give a series of lectures during the Chicago Chamber of Music Festival. On 29 January 1931 he married a divorcée called Paula Lecler, an American poet. The marriage was short-lived and in July 1933 Henry married (bigamously) another divorcée, a German-born US citizen, Hedwig Steinborn Palmerly.

Vaughan-Henry had firm far-right views, was pro-German and antisemitic. During the inter-war period he was until 1935 a member of the British Union of Fascists and a leading light in the National Citizens Union. He spoke out against Jews at public meetings, and wrote on culture topics for the BUF's The Blackshirt, the party's official newspaper. He was a frequent visitor to Berlin, corresponded with and was entertained by Nazi Party officials, and made a radio broadcast for Hitler's propaganda chief Joseph Goebbels. During this period he also became acquainted with Norah Briscoe, later imprisoned as a Nazi collaborator.

=== World War II and the 'Notting Hill Conspiracy' ===
In April 1940, Vaughan-Henry was fined and bound over to keep the peace for six months for an antisemitic rant - "disgusting and unbridled language against the Jews" - made at a lunchtime meeting of the English National Association. Magistrates at Old Street police court gave him the choice between a £250 fine and three months in prison; he paid the fine. He was also bound over to be of good behaviour for six months, which he ignored. He continued to make violent anti-war and seditious speeches at concerts secretly funded by the Nazis.

Vaughan-Henry was behind the 'Notting Hill Conspiracy', the most serious and developed attempt at a coup in Britain during the Second World War. For this plot he established a secret network of 18 cells each with 25 members and planned a coup – installing General Edmund Ironside as leader – once the Nazis had captured the Channel ports. Vaughan-Henry, who was communicating with the Abwehr through his wife who was living in Germany, had acquired a printing press, transport facilities, a network of accommodation addresses, and was forging false identity papers. At the time of his arrest by Special Branch officers in June 1940 in Stanley Crescent, Notting Hill, Vaughan-Henry also appears to have marshalled considerable sums of money and was attempting to negotiate an arms deal to purchase weaponry. Vaughan-Henry was detained under the Defence Regulations and held in Liverpool and Brixton prisons and the Ham Common interrogation facility (Latchmere House) before being interned on the Isle of Man. (While at Brixton prison in December 1941, Vaughan-Henry applied for a 48-hour parole to meet Margaret Glyn, shortly before the death of her husband Sir Arthur Glyn, to discuss a possible bequest.)

Author Tim Tate speculates that the British government’s failure to prosecute him under the Treachery Act may have been due to a desire not to reveal the identities of senior figures from the upper echelons of society and military, even in the proceedings of a secret trial closed to the media. There is no evidence that Ironside was aware of the conspiracy or many of actors within it, although he was removed from his post shortly after Vaughan-Henry’s arrest.

=== Post-war life ===
Vaughan-Henry was released after the end of war and continued to be active in the British music community. He was music director of the London Shakespeare Festival Week in 1938, 1945, and 1946, and organized and conducted orchestra concerts of British music, and the National Welsh Festival Concerts and appeared on the BBC. As well as The Moon Robber opera, his compositions included Llyn-y-Fan, a symphonic poem, and various pieces on Welsh themes.

After Margaret Glyn died in 1946, Vaughan-Henry was a beneficiary of her will, which was contested by her surviving relatives. He inherited property and businesses which he sold off, while the Glyn family papers were acquired by the local council.

In 1951, Hedwig filed for divorce, accusing Vaughan-Henry of cruelty and adultery. However, the case was dismissed due to their bigamous marriage (Hedwig had obtained a mail-order 'quickie' divorce from Mexico, which was not recognised in England). Resident at Three Cups, Heathfield, Sussex, Vaughan-Henry died in a London hospital in March 1958; short obituaries (for example, in the Evening News and The Times) covered only his music career, including how The Moon Robber was smuggled out of the internment camp hidden in a bundle of washing.
