= Pearl Vardon =

British Nazi propaganda broadcaster

Pearl Joyce Vardon (5 April 1915 in Jersey, Channel Islands – November 2011) was a British broadcaster of Nazi propaganda during World War II. In 1946 she was convicted of an offence under the Defence Regulations and sentenced to nine months' imprisonment.

== Biography ==
Pearl Vardon was a school teacher on Jersey when the island fell under the German occupation of the Channel Islands in 1940. As she spoke German, she found herself ordered by the German administration to work locally as an interpreter for a construction company based in Cologne. She began a relationship with a Wehrmacht officer, Oberleutnant Siegfried Schwatlo, and when he was posted to Germany in 1944 she decided to go with him.

== Propaganda for Nazi Germany ==
Vardon began employment as an announcer at Radio Luxembourg for the DES, the Deutsche Europasender. She introduced music and programmes such as Ladies First which criticised the USA and praised Germany's social security system, and Matters of Moment which gave news from a German perspective. More significantly, in For the Forces and their Kin, she read out letters written by British POWs for their families back home. A German colleague later said of Vardon's attitude that she "simply hated all things English and loved all things German".

In mid 1944 she was evacuated to Berlin and in October 1944 she was working at Apen in Lower Saxony until the Red Army drew close on the advancing Eastern Front.

== Arrest and trial ==
Vardon fled from Apen to Wilhelmshaven, arriving on 30 April 1945. She was arrested there when she enquired how to obtain new identity papers and she was then held by the British Army at Esterwegen Internment Camp, the former Esterwegen concentration camp, where she was interrogated.

Vardon was tried at the Old Bailey in February 1946. There she pleaded guilty to the offence of ‘doing an act likely to assist the enemy’ and was given a nine-month prison sentence.

== After release ==
Pearl Vardon eventually married Siegfried Schwatlo in 1950 at Abergavenny, Monmouthshire. She died in November 2011, in Weißenburg, Bavaria, Germany, at the age of 96.

== Declassified files ==
The declassified MI5 files on her were released by the Public Record Office in 2000. They show that British prosecutors were inclined to take a more lenient attitude towards female collaborators such as Vardon and Margaret Joyce, the wife of the traitor William Joyce, than with their male counterparts.

The MI5 report on Vardon states, ‘Her motive seems to have been the clear one of avoiding as much as possible separation from the German officer with whom she fell in love’ but added, ‘It is just possible that her motives were not so simple as they appear to have been on the surface’. The Security Service file on her is held by The National Archives under reference KV 2/256 and the Home Office file on her is held there under reference HO 45/25811.

== See also ==
- Leonard Banning
- Norah Briscoe
- Gertrude Hiscox
- Tyler Kent
- John Lingshaw
- Dorothy O'Grady
- Anna Wolkoff
