= Margaret Glyn =

English music historian (1865–1946)

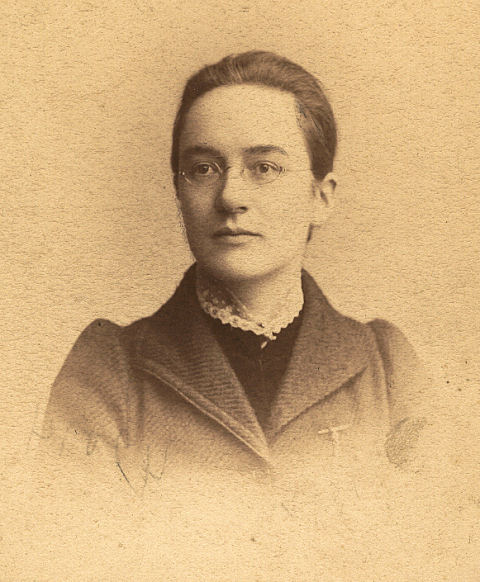

Margaret Henrietta Glyn (1865–1946) was an English music historian specialising in Elizabethan keyboard music. A member of the family of Glyn baronets of Ewell, she benefited Ewell by her life and legacy.

== Family ==
She was born on 28 February 1865 in Ewell, Surrey, the third child of Rev. George Lewen Glyn, 4th Baronet, and his second wife Henrietta, also née Glyn. She had three half-siblings including George Tubervill Glyn, 5th Baronet, and four siblings including Gervas Powell Glyn, 6th Baronet, who shared her interest in music. Gervas and Margaret published a collection of short stories called The Adventures of a Blockhead and His Family together in 1924. They also collaborated on a collection of poem and song translations in 1925.

== Music and writing ==
Margaret studied the organ, violin and viola privately in London with Yorke Trotter and C.J. Frost. She composed six symphonies and six orchestral suites among other music.

After publishing a translation of Wagner's Parsifal and two books on musicology, she turned her attention to early modern English keyboard music. She produced editions of Elizabethan composers for keyed instruments such as Orlando Gibbons, Thomas Weelkes and John Bull, and the comprehensive About Elizabethan Virginal Music and its Composers (1924). Though her conclusions have been questioned, her work is acknowledged for its innovation. She has been described as 'one of the first writers to situate non-Western music within an analytical context,' and 'among the earliest English writers to specialize in the study of 16th- and 17th-century English keyboard music.'

She set up two companies to 'further the cause of Tudor and Celtic music' with Welsh composer Leigh Vaughan Henry.

== Community involvement ==
Margaret was attached to her home village of Ewell, writing on its history and topography. In the 1920s she opposed plans by Surrey County Council to run a bypass through Hatch Furlong, and secured the Nonsuch Palace Banqueting House site as compensation for it.

She died in Ewell on 3 June 1946, bequeathing her music room, Glyn Hall, to the village. She had used it to host concerts and to display her collection of antique musical instruments. She left much of her property to Leigh Vaughan-Henry, leading to an unsuccessful court case arguing that he held too much influence over her.

== Works ==
=== As author ===
- The Rhythmic Conception of Music (London, 1907)
- Analysis of the Evolution of Musical Form (London, 1909)
- About Elizabethan Virginal Music and its Composers (London, 1924, enlarged 1934)

=== As editor ===
- The Byrd Organ Book (London, 1923)
- Thomas Weelkes: Pieces for Keyed Instruments (London, 1924)
- Orlando Gibbons: Complete Keyboard Works (London, 1925)
- Parthenia (London, 1927)
- John Bull: Keyboard Music (London, 1930)
- Early English Organ Music (16th Century), Plainsong and Mediaeval Music Society (London, 1939)

=== As translator ===
- R. Wagner: Parsifal (London, 1890, 2/1914)
- with G.P. Glyn: Poems and Song Translations (London, 1925)
