= Paul Briscoe =

English writer

- Born: July 12, 1930; Streatham, London, England, UK
- Died: August 15, 2010 (aged 80)
- Occupations: School teacher and writer
- Mother: Norah Briscoe

Paul Briscoe (July 12, 1930 – August 15, 2010) was an English schoolteacher and writer. Briscoe was known for his two autobiographies about spending much of his childhood living in Nazi Germany.

== Biography ==
=== Early life ===
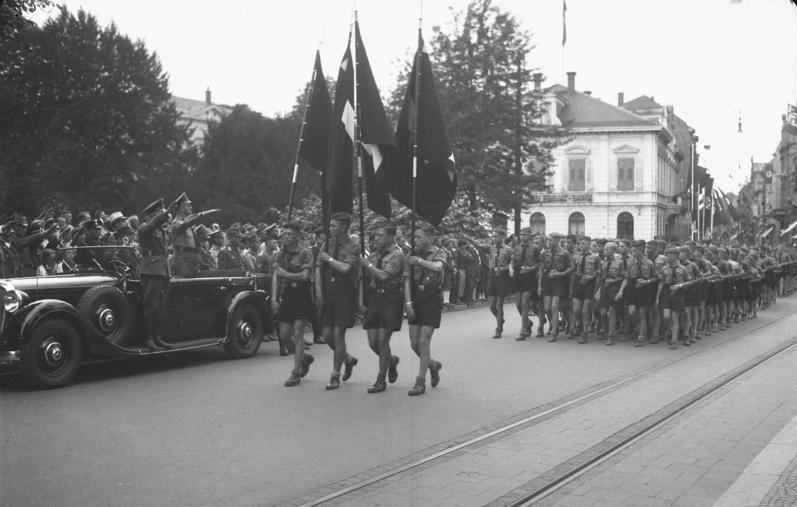
Keen to prove himself as a model German boy, Briscoe was excited to join the Deutsche Jungvolk (junior section of the Hitler Youth)

Paul Briscoe was born in Streatham, south-west London, on 12 July 1930. His father was a clerk who died in 1932 and his mother was a freelance journalist with fascist sympathies and little affection for her son whose care she primarily left to a nanny. In 1935, she took her son on a tour of Germany with her German boyfriend; they spent many months living in hotels and guesthouses around the country whilst Norah Briscoe wrote about the experience for British publications. When his mother returned home to continue her career and later drifted away from her fiancé, Briscoe was left with his parents in Miltenberg, Bavaria. He moved in with them permanently when he was six, so that he could attend school. Later in life, he would write that the ideology of the Nazi Party and antisemitism was taught in his lessons and how at the age of eight years old he was taken by his teachers to a local synagogue and sent in to loot it during Kristallnacht.

When, at the outbreak of the Second World War, his mother's attempts to get him back to the United Kingdom failed. Briscoe's foster family adopted him to spare the boy internment. Seeing the war as an opportunity to prove his loyalty to his adoptive family and nation, Briscoe became an enthusiastic member of the Hitler Youth and in 1944 joined the auxiliary fire service where he was injured in an air raid. The following year he was an eyewitness to the surrender of Miltenberg by its mayor and the town's occupation by American troops. In October 1945, a British Army officer came to collect him to return to his home country and mother. The two of them found a home and employment in a community for pacifists and misfits. Over the following years, Briscoe moved away from the worldview he had been taught as a child and began to look back on his participation in Kristallnacht with shame.

=== Adulthood ===
In 1949, Briscoe returned to Germany on national service where he was sent to spy on Neo-Nazi groups in civilian clothing. After demobilisation he repaired historic buildings for the Ministry of Works. In 1956 he married Monica Larter, an infant schoolteacher. In 1960 he, too, qualified as a teacher and he went on to teach woodwork and German at schools in Essex and Suffolk. In 1975 he became joint manager of his wife's family farm at Framlingham, where he played an active part in the community as a church warden, conservationist and supporter of local charities. Near the end of his life, he gave many talks about his experiences in Britain and Germany and wrote two autobiographical memoirs, Foster Fatherland (2002) and My Friend the Enemy (2007).
