= English National Association =

English far-right political organisation

The English National Association (ENA) was a political group active in the United Kingdom during the Second World War. It was accused of having fascist sympathies.

== History ==
Formed by John Webster in 1942, the ENA was led by Edward Godfrey, a former member of the British Union of Fascists who had served under Admiral Sir Barry Domvile in the Royal Navy. The ENA, which sought to regroup former members of the British Union of Fascists, was originally called the British National Party (BNP). The group was funded by the Duke of Bedford, a veteran supporter of right-wing movements, most notably the British People's Party. Calling for a negotiated peace, the group attempted to march on the Cenotaph in 1942 but the demonstration was banned by the authorities and the group came under suspicion. The BNP, which emphasised anti-Semitism, initially gained some support and not long after its foundation claimed to have 50 branches across the country. It also enjoyed the support of a number of right-wing journals, such as those of Captain Bernard Acworth and Joseph Ball, as well as the backing of the British League of Ex-Servicemen and Women, a group that had been associated with the BUF and which was later taken over by Jeffrey Hamm. William Craven, a farm worker from Gloucester who was sentenced to life imprisonment for twice writing to government agencies of Nazi Germany to offer his services, was also a BNP member following his expulsion from the BUF for extremism.

In order to avoid the attentions of the government Godfrey disbanded the BNP in 1943 before recreating the group immediately as the ENA. Like most groups in existence at the time however many supporters were loath to join as they feared that active groups were too easily infiltrated by MI5. Before long Webster had left to form his own English Legion and they did not survive the war.

The group contested the 1943 Acton by-election with Godfrey officially running as independent, although he finished bottom of the poll with 258 votes.
