= Büro Concordia =

WW2-era German radio organisation

Büro Concordia was an organisation of Joseph Goebbels' Ministry of Propaganda in Nazi Germany that operated clandestine or "black" radio stations that broadcast into Allied and neutral countries. The service was designed to appeal to discontented minorities and included Radio Caledonia, which was targeted at Scottish nationalists, the Christian Peace Movement station, which was aimed at Christian pacifists, and Workers' Challenge, which purported to be a British communist/socialist radio station and encouraged British workers to go on strike against their capitalist bosses. For the Soviet audience, the Ministry of Propaganda ran the station Lenin's Old Guard, speaking ostensibly on behalf of the anti-Stalinist Communist opposition in the USSR which was purged in the 1930s; it was the only remaining transmitter in the East. It was presented as though it was domestically generated by internal dissidents rather than broadcast from abroad by the Nazi regime.

== Incomplete list of Büro Concordia stations ==
Büro Concordia ran 19 black stations, not all simultaneously:

- Christian Peace Movement
- Lenin's Old Guard
- Nutcracker
- New British Broadcasting Station
- Radio Caledonia
- Radio Free America
- Radio Free India
- Radio Humanite
- Radio National
- Station Debunk
- Voice of Free Arabia
- Worker's Challenge

== See also ==
- List of English-language broadcasters for Nazi Germany
