= The Link (UK organisation) =

British pro-Nazi organisation 1937–1939

- Formation: July 1937; 89 years ago
- Founder: Admiral Barry Domvile
- Dissolved: September 1939; 87 years ago
- Purpose: Activism; Anglo-German friendship; appeasement; antisemitism
- Headquarters: Strand, London
- Members: 4,300 (1939)
- Main organ: National council
- Publication: The Anglo-German Review

The Link was a British pro-Nazi, independent, non-party organisation to promote Anglo-German friendship established in July 1937 and terminated by the outbreak of the Second World War in September 1939. At its height, its membership numbered around 4,300 in 35 chapters. It was founded by Admiral Barry Domvile as an explicitly pro-Nazi alternative to the less overtly pro-Nazi Anglo-German Fellowship. The Link generally operated as a cultural organisation hosting parties, dances, and film nights, although its magazine, The Anglo-German Review, reflected pro-Nazi views, and its chapters often hosted antisemitic and pro-Nazi speeches in addition to other cultural activities. It attracted a number of antisemites and pro-Nazis, particularly in its London and Belfast chapters, while also attracting some anti-war pacifists including the Labour Party member Wenman J. Bassett-Lowke.

Shortly before Britain entered World War II, the organisation was investigated by MI5 and the Home Secretary confirmed that The Link had acted as an instrument of the German propaganda service. During the war its founder, Domvile, was interned under Defence Regulation 18B, after being implicated in a fascist plot against the British government in 1940.

== Origins ==
A prior organisation with similar aims, the Anglo-German Fellowship, had been founded in 1935 by Ernest Tennant with the aid of Joachim von Ribbentrop as an unabashedly elitist organisation intended to bring together German and British elites. It had a complementary organisation in Berlin, the Deutsch-Englische Gesellschaft. The Fellowship was pro-German, but internally divided over the question of Nazi antisemitism.

One of the antisemitic members of the executive board of the Fellowship was the retired Admiral Barry Domvile who was quite outspoken about his beliefs about a Jewish-Masonic conspiracy to take over the world. Domvile was displeased with Fellowship's refusal to directly endorse Nazi antisemitism and with its elitism. He broke away in 1937 to found The Link as an openly pro-Nazi and antisemitic group that, as its name suggested, was to serve as a link with the Nazi Party, on a suggestion from the editor of The Anglo-German Review, Cola Ernest Carroll. Domvile established The Link in July 1937 as an "independent non-party organisation to promote Anglo-German friendship". In a press release, Domvile announced that the purpose of The Link was "to foster the mutual knowledge and understanding that ought to exist between the British and German peoples" and to counter the "flood of lies" written about Nazi Germany by allegedly Jewish-controlled British media.

== Organisation ==
The national council of The Link comprised Barry Domvile, John Brown of the British Legion, Anglo-German Review editor Cola Ernest Carroll, the chemist Arthur Pillans Laurie, Susan Fass of the Anglo-German Kameradschaft and the historian Raymond Beazley. As The Link grew in numbers, other prominent people who joined its national council included the father of the Mitford Sisters, Lord Redesdale; the Conservative MP, Sir Albert Lambert Ward; the war hero, Captain Edward Unwin, who won a Victoria Cross at the Battle of Gallipoli; the aviation pioneer and later traitor, Lord Sempill; Councillor Wenman J. Bassett-Lowke of Northampton county borough council; A.E.R. Dyer; Archibald Crawford and Hubert Maddocks. A notable late addition to The Link's national council, who joined in the summer of 1939,was the Duke of Westminster, a landlord who owned much of London and was one of the richest men in the world.

Of the members of the national council, Domvile, Carroll and Laurie were the most active while Ward, Unwin, Redesdale and Semphill merely lent their names to add prestige to the group. Bassett-Lowke, the president of the Northampton chapter; Maddocks, the president of the Southend chapter; and Beazley, the president of the Birmingham chapter were included on The Link's national council because their chapters were the largest chapters.

In March 1938, The Link had 1,800 members and it had 2,400 by July 1938. By June 1939, The Link had 4,300 members and 35 branches. The majority of the chapters of The Link were located in the London area and in the Midlands, though there were also large chapters in the West Country; "service towns" such as Bromley and Portsmouth; and Northern Ireland. The majority of the members of The Link were middle class and the group drew strong support from members of municipal councils with aldermen and councilors being well represented in its ranks.

Presumably because Domvile was a retired admiral, some of the chapters tended to be dominated by retired members of the Royal Navy. By contrast, the chapters in the West Country were more dominated by former Army officers and the gentry. Despite the organisation's stated purpose of being a link to the Nazi Party, the majority of its members seemed unaware of this. The historian Richard Griffiths wrote: "The members were perfectly ordinary people, drawn to Anglo-German friendship, who seem to have been almost unaware of the political implications of membership".

== Activities ==
=== Chapter activities ===
The Southend chapter seems to have been typical of The Link with the majority of its activities devoted to parties, dances and film nights. However, both Barry Domvile and Arthur Pillans Laurie gave explicitly political speeches at the Southend chapter on the subject of seeking closer relations with Nazi Germany. A German professor, Otto Wagner, gave a speech at the Southend chapter on 7 April 1938 on "the aims of German foreign policy". Finally, Hubert Maddocks gave a speech at the Southend chapter that complained that the British newspapers were trying to sabotage Anglo-German friendship by giving undue attention to the persecution of the Jews in Germany.

The Croydon chapter had an Anglican churchman give a speech on "peace through friendship" with Germany and sent the children of its members off to a trip to Hamburg, Germany to spend the summer of 1938 as guests of the Hitler Youth.

The most overtly fascistic of The Link's chapters were the Belfast, Acton and Ealing, and Central London chapters. The Central London chapter, which was founded in January 1939, was the most clearly antisemitic and pro-Nazi of The Link's chapters and its president, Margaret Bothamley, was an outspoken antisemitic conspiracy theorist. In one of her speeches given in May 1939, Bothamley stated: "the Jewish question was behind the determination to assert the 'independence' of Austria". Other speakers at the Central London chapter in 1939 included Philip Spranklin, formerly of the British Union of Fascists (BUF) who was now working as a spokesman for the Foreign Press Office of the German Ministry of Propaganda; General J. F. C. Fuller, the defense correspondent of the Daily Mail and the military adviser to the BUF who just returned from attending Hitler's 50th birthday in Berlin on 20 April 1939; and the Conservative MP, Archibald Ramsay who gave a speech in June 1939 on "The Secret Forces Working for War".

=== The Anglo-German Review ===
The Link was closely associated with the monthly glossy magazine The Anglo-German Review, known for its pro-German, anti-French stances and its flattering cover images and features for Nazi Party officials such as Adolf Hitler, Joseph Goebbels, and Hermann Göring.

The Review technically began operations almost a year before The Link was established, in September 1936, and remained technically independent, but Domvile nonetheless referred to it as "the organ of publicity used by the 'Link'", the Review's offices were next to The Link's offices on London's Strand, and the editor of the Review was Cola Ernest Carroll who was also a member of The Link's national council and who had suggested establishing The Link to Domvile. The Link also channeled funds from the Nazis to the Review. Carroll was a severely wounded veteran of World War I who had previously worked as editor for the newspaper of the British Legion. Due to limited staffing, Carroll also wrote lead news and analysis each month.

=== The Link letter ===
On 12 October 1938, a letter to The Times that came to be known as "The Link letter" was published. The letter read:

We, the undersigned, who believe that real friendship and co-operation between Great Britain and Germany are essential to the establishment of enduring peace not only in Western Europe, but throughout the whole world, strongly deprecate the attempt which is being made to sabotage an Anglo-German rapprochement by distorting the facts of the Czechoslovak settlement. We believe the Munich Agreement was nothing more than the rectification of one of the most flagrant injustices of the Peace Treaties. It took nothing from Czechoslovakia to which that country could rightly lay claim and gave nothing to Germany which could have been rightfully withheld. We see in the policy so courageously pursued by the Prime Minister the end of a long period of lost opportunities and the promise of a new era compared to which the tragic years that have gone since the War will seem like a bad dream.

Not all who signed the letter were members of The Link, and for this reason the letter is often seen as a sign of The Link's influence. Of the signatures who were members of The Link included Admiral Domvile, C.E. Carroll, Raymond Beazley; A.E.R. Dyer; Lord Redesdale and Arthur Laurie. People who were not members of The Link at the time who signed the letter included the Conservative MP Archibald Ramsay; Admiral Wilmot Nicholson; George Pitt-Rivers; Nesta Webster; Lord Londonderry; Lord Mount Temple; William Harbutt Dawson; the politician Lord Arnold; the Conservative MP John Smedley Crooke; the journalist Douglas Jerrold; the former Viceroy of India Lord Hardinge of Penhurst; Lord Fairfax; Sir John Latta; Bernard Acworth; Arthur Solly-Flood; Arthur Rogers; Vincent Molteno; and Admiral Edward Inglefield.

=== Appeals to pacifism and Labour ===
The Link opposed war between Britain and Germany and thus attracted the support of some British pacifists. After The Link and the Anglo-German Review were included among peace organisations across the political spectrum in the Peace Service Handbook, a publication put out by the Peace Pledge Union in May 1939, The Daily Telegraph in July 1939 published a memorandum of the Economic League asserting that the PPU was being used as a channel for Nazi propaganda and the News Chronicle on 11 August 1939 published an interview of PPU member Stuart Morris containing the quote "I'm all for giving a great deal more away [to Hitler]. I don't think that Mr. Chamberlain has really started yet on any serious appeasement."

The PPU was a much larger organisation, with 130,000 members in 1,150 local groups before the war in contrast to The Link's 4,300 members and 35 branches. In response to the News Chronicle, PPU member Stuart Morris wrote to the paper on 13 August 1939 stating there was no connection between the PPU and The Link and that the PPU did not support the German demand for colonies or support peace at the expense of smaller nations. The PPU also sent a letter to its group leaders dissociating The Link from the PPU and ceased publishing the Peace Service Handbook.

Wenman J. Basset-Lowke, the president of the Northampton chapter of The Link, was also a member of the Labour Party. Lord Paget in a letter of 17 September 1976 wrote: "Bill Bassett-Lowke was a model manufacturer, a Fabian Socialist; an internationalist, as good as gold, and as soft as a mop. He was a natural sucker for The Link". In the summer of 1939, there was some discussion about whatever Bassett-Lowke could be a member of both the Labour Party and The Link at the same time, and there were demands made by some Labour Party activists that Bassett-Lowke be expelled if he continued to serve as the president of The Link's Northampton chapter. The national executive of the Labour Party dithered over the question of expelling Bassett-Lowke and the matter had still not been resolved by September 1939, when the United Kingdom entered World War II.

The Labour Party was badly divided in the 1930s between a pacifistic faction opposed to all war in general along with rearmament vs. a faction that was willing to support a war provided it was done so under the auspices of the League of Nations to resist aggression. The Sudetenland crisis of 1938 caused much internal tension in the Labour Party between its anti-war vs anti-fascist wings with some Labour MPs stating that it would amoral for Britain to go to war against Germany under the grounds that all wars were evil while other Labour MPs argued that Britain had a moral duty to defend Czechoslovakia should Germany invade. By the time of the Danzig crisis in March 1939, the anti-fascist wing of the Labour Party was in ascendency. Labour accepted the imposition of peacetime conscription by the Chamberlain government in May 1939 despite having previously vowed to oppose such a policy and urged the government to create the "peace front" to unite Britain, France, and the Soviet Union in an alliance meant to deter Germany from invading Poland.

The decision by the Labour National Executive to essentially ignore the question of whatever Basset-Lowke should be expelled from the Labour Party represented a concession to the anti-war wing of the Labour Party. Basset-Lowke presented himself not as a fascist, but merely a man of peace who was trying to prevent a world war by seeking better understanding between the British and German peoples.

== Investigation and termination ==
The organisation was investigated by Maxwell Knight, head of counter-subversion in MI5. Of all the various British fascist groups, The Link was the one most suspect to officials because of its ties to the Nazi Party. In the summer of 1939, The Link's leader Barry Domvile's phone was tapped by MI5, which revealed that he was making regular phone calls to George Ward Price, the "extra-special correspondent" of the Daily Mail newspaper, urging him to write articles calling for Britain to abandon the "guarantee" of Poland. On 3 August 1939 British Home Secretary Sir Samuel Hoare confirmed to Parliament that The Link had been used as an instrument of German propaganda and that at least one of its organisers had been funded by Germany, albeit legally, via a question from Liberal Party MP Sir Geoffrey Mander.

The Link was not so pro-Nazi as to be overtly anti-British, and it closed immediately after the United Kingdom's entry into World War II against Germany on 3 September 1939. Domvile put out a statement in The Times on 7 September 1939 to the effect that, with war declared, “the King’s enemies became our enemies. We had done our best for better Anglo-German relations ... and there was no more to be done.”

Nonetheless, Domvile was interned in 1940 under Defence Regulation 18B, as someone who might be "prejudicial to the public safety or the defence of the realm". He had been recently implicated in a fascist plot against the British government.

Anthony Masters has alleged that the Link was resurrected in 1940 by Ian Fleming, then working in the Department of Naval Intelligence, in order to successfully lure Rudolf Hess (deputy party leader and third in leadership of Germany, after Adolf Hitler and Hermann Göring) to Britain in May 1941.

== See also ==
- Anglo-German Fellowship
- British Union of Fascists
- Appeasement

== Bibliography ==
- Goldman, Aaron L. (1972). "The Link and the Anglo-German Review". South Atlantic Quarterly. 71 (3): 424–433. doi:10.1215/00382876-71-3-424.
- Griffiths, Richard (1980). Fellow Travellers of the Right: British Enthusiasts for Nazi Germany, 1933-9. London: Constable. ISBN 0571271324.
- Griffiths, Richard (1998). Patriotism Perverted: Captain Ramsay, the Right Club, and British Anti-Semitism, 1939-1940. London: Faber & Faber. ISBN 9780571310456.
- Holmes, Colin (2016). Searching for Lord Haw-Haw: The Political Lives of William Joyce. London: Taylor & Francis. ISBN 9781317408352.
- Imlay, Talbot (2011). "Politics, Strategy and Economics: A Comparative Analysis of British and French 'Appeasement'". In Frank McDonough (ed.). The Origins of the Second World War: An International Perspective. London: Continuum. p. 262-279. ISBN 9781441164438.
- Kershaw, Ian (2004). Making Friends with Hitler: Lord Londonderry, the Nazis, and the Road to War. London: Penguin Books. ISBN 0143036076.
- Lukowitz, David C. (1974). "British Pacifists and Appeasement: The Peace Pledge Union". Journal of Contemporary History. 9 (1): 115–127. doi:10.1177/002200947400900107. JSTOR 260271.
