= Barry Domvile =

Royal Navy Admiral and Nazi sympathiser (1878–1971)

Admiral Sir Barry Domvile KBE CB CMG
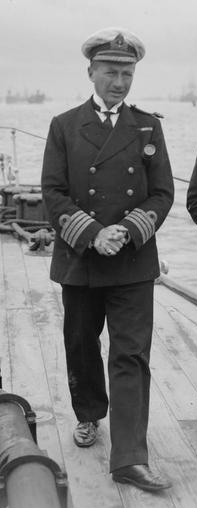
- Born: 5 September 1878; London, England, United Kingdom
- Died: 13 August 1971 (aged 92); London, England, United Kingdom
- Military career
- Allegiance: United Kingdom
- Branch: Royal Navy
- Service years: 1892–1936
- Rank: Admiral
- Commands: HMS Miranda; HMS Tipperary; HMS Centaur; HMS Curacoa; HMS Royal Sovereign; Royal Naval College, Greenwich
- Conflicts: World War I
- Awards: Knight Commander of the Order of the British Empire; Companion of the Order of the Bath; Companion of the Order of St Michael and St George

Admiral Sir Barry Edward Domvile, KBE, CB, CMG (5 September 1878 – 13 August 1971) was a high-ranking Royal Navy officer who was interned during the Second World War for being a Nazi sympathiser. Throughout the 1930s, he expressed support for Germany's Adolf Hitler as well as pro-Nazi and antisemitic sentiments. Domvile was implicated in two fascist plots against the British government in 1940.

== Naval career ==
Domvile was the son of Admiral Sir Compton Domvile and followed his father into the Royal Navy in 1892. In 1912, he became Naval Assistant Secretary to the Committee of Imperial Defence, and during the First World War he commanded the destroyer HMS Miranda, the destroyer HMS Tipperary, the cruiser HMS Centaur and then the cruiser HMS Curacoa. After the war, he became Director of Plans in 1920, and Chief of Staff to the Commander-in-Chief, Mediterranean in 1922 before becoming, in 1925, commanding officer of the battleship HMS Royal Sovereign.

He served as Director of Naval Intelligence from 1927 to 1930, then commanded the Third Cruiser Squadron from 1931 to 1932, and served as President of the Royal Naval College, Greenwich from 1932 to 1934.

== Far-right activism ==
Domvile visited Germany in 1935 and was impressed by many aspects of the Nazi government. He was invited to attend the Nuremberg Rally of September 1936 as a guest of German Ambassador Joachim von Ribbentrop. Domvile became a council member of the Anglo-German Fellowship and founded the Anglo-German organisation The Link. He was also a member of the Right Club.

Domvile supported St John Philby, the antisemitic British People's Party candidate in the Hythe by-election of 1939, and visited Salzburg that summer, which attracted some criticism. Domvile was prominent in British far-right circles as the prospect of war seemed imminent in the late 1930s. His pro-Nazi and anti-war sympathies were expressed in an endorsement to the 1939 book The Case For Germany.

== Second World War ==
In 1940, Domvile was implicated as a participant in a fascist plot, organized by Leigh Vaughan-Henry, against the British government. Vaughan-Henry was reported to have already organized 18 cells of 25 members each for the coup, which was intended to take place when Germany landed in Britain. He was also implicated in another plot organized by Archibald Maule Ramsay, the founder of the Right Club.

In June 1940, Domvile's mistress, Olive Baker, was arrested for distributing leaflets promoting Reichssender Hamburg. She tried to commit suicide in prison and was sentenced to five years' imprisonment. Domvile himself was interned during Second World War under Defence Regulation 18B from 7 July 1940 to 29 July 1943. During his wartime captivity, he wrote an autobiographical memoir, From Admiral to Cabin Boy. It was first published in 1947 and republished in 2008.

== Later life ==
Domvile largely faded from public life in the postwar period. He denied the Holocaust and continued to defend Germany, describing the war as a "punitive expedition" against a "nation which had rebelled against the financial system." Domvile decried the Nuremberg executions in October 1946, stating that, "The Nuremberg victims died bravely, and are more likely to survive in history as martyrs, than criminals." He later became a supporter of the League of Empire Loyalists but was never more than a peripheral figure in that group. Domvile was a member of the National Front's National Council from its formation in 1967 to his death in 1971.

Domvile served on the "Armed Services Committee" of the extreme right grouping known as the "Shickshinny Knights of Malta", not to be confused with the actual Knights of Malta.

== Books ==
- By and Large, pub Hutchinson, 1936 (His autobiography)
- From Admiral to Cabin Boy (1947; the 'cabin' referred to is Domvile's cell at Brixton prison during his internment) ISBN 0-89562-099-5; online
- Look to Your Moat (A history of British naval and merchant seamen)
- The Great Taboo: Freemasonry
- Straight from the Jew's Mouth
- Truth about Anti-Semitism

Military offices
Preceded by William Fisher	Director of Naval Intelligence; 1927–1930	Succeeded by Cecil Usborne
Preceded by Sir William Boyle	President, Royal Naval College, Greenwich; 1932–1934	Succeeded by Sir Ragnar Colvin
