= Archibald Maule Ramsay =

British politician (1894–1955)

- Ramsay in 1937

Member of Parliament for Peebles and Southern Midlothian
- In office 27 October 1931 – 15 June 1945
- Preceded by: Joseph Westwood
- Succeeded by: David Pryde

Personal details
- Born: Archibald Henry Maule Ramsay; 4 May 1894 Scotland
- Died: 11 March 1955 (aged 60) United Kingdom
- Party: Scottish Unionist
- Spouse: Lady Ismay Crichton-Stuart

Military service
- Allegiance: United Kingdom
- Branch/service: British Army
- Years of service: 1913–1920
- Rank: Captain
- Battles/wars: World War I

Archibald Henry Maule Ramsay (4 May 1894 – 11 March 1955) was a British Army officer who later went into politics as a Scottish Unionist Member of Parliament (MP). From the late 1930s, he developed increasingly strident antisemitic views. In 1940, after his involvement with a suspected spy at the United States embassy, he became the only British MP to be interned under Defence Regulation 18B.

In 1939, Ramsay formed the explicitly pro-Nazi Right Club, intending to unify far-right extremists across Britain. According to reports by MI5, he was plotting a fascist coup, intended to take place if and when German troops landed on British soil. In furtherance of this plan, he placed informants within the police, the Ministry of Economic Warfare, Air Ministry censorship branch, and Churchill's War Cabinet.

== Family and early life ==
Ramsay was from a Scottish aristocratic family; his grandfather was Sir Henry Ramsay, a younger brother of George Ramsay, 12th Earl of Dalhousie. He was educated at Eton College and the Royal Military College, Sandhurst, then in September 1913 was commissioned into the Coldstream Guards. After the outbreak of the First World War, Ramsay served in France for two years, then received a severe head injury and transferred to the War Office in London. Here he met and on 30 April 1917 married Lady Ismay Crichton-Stuart, the only daughter of Jenico Preston, 14th Viscount Gormanston and widow of Lord Ninian Crichton-Stuart MP, who had been killed on active service in 1915. His wife was the mother of three surviving children. The couple later had four sons together; the eldest died on active service in 1943.

As the war was coming to an end, Ramsay served at the British War Mission in Paris. He was placed on the half-pay list "on account of ill-health, caused by wounds" in 1920 and retired from the Army in 1922 with the rank of captain. He spent the 1920s as a company director, near Arbroath, Angus, and became active in the Unionist Party. In the 1931 general election, Ramsay was elected as MP for Peebles and Southern Midlothian. He was not considered a potential candidate for high office; the most senior appointment he obtained was as a Government member of the Potato Marketing Board. Ramsay was regarded as a "gentleman politician" that was common in rural Scotland at the time, a scion of the Scottish aristocracy, a graduate of Eton and Sandhurst who had served in the British Army, and lived in a castle. Ramsay represented a rural constituency in the House of Commons, and almost all of his questions in the House of Commons prior to 1937 related to agricultural questions, especially Scottish agriculture. Ramsay was generally known as "Jock" instead of Archibald or "Archie", and was popular in his seat.

== Spanish Civil War ==
After the Spanish Civil War broke out, Ramsay became a strong supporter of the Nationalists under Francisco Franco, largely arising out of his opposition to the violent anti-clericalism of the Spanish Republicans and their attacks on the Roman Catholic Church. Ramsay was a Protestant, but his religious zeal led him to side against the "godless" Spanish Republic. In the early months of the war, he objected in Parliament to what he saw as bias in BBC news reports on Spain; he pointed to links between Spanish Republicans and the Soviet Union. The British historian Richard Griffiths noted that Ramsay's career up to 1937 had been "fairly uneventful" with him playing the part of a Conservative backbencher holding the standard views associated with a Tory MP, but the Spanish Civil War radicalised him. The news that the Soviet Union had intervened in the Spanish Civil War on the side of the Spanish Republic was taken by him as a sort of declaration of war upon himself, and he committed himself to the victory of the Spanish Nationalists over the "godless" Spanish Republicans. In 1937, the German "pocket battleship" Deutschland which had been operating off the coast of Spain in support of the Nationalists was damaged in a Soviet air attack. In a speech in the House of Commons on 4 June 1937, Ramsay called the air attack on the Deutschland as having been "organised by international Communist agencies with the object of embroiling as many countries as possible in an European war". In July 1937, he denounced France for signing a military alliance with the Soviet Union in 1935, and called the Franco-Soviet alliance an opportunity for "Soviet subversive propaganda", which was "a more formidable weapon than the Soviet Army" to threaten Great Britain.

Late in 1937, Ramsay formed the 'United Christian Front' to combat attacks on Christianity "which emanate from Moscow". Many distinguished peers and churchmen joined, but the organisation was criticised in a letter to The Times by senior religious figures, including William Temple (Archbishop of York) and Donald Soper. The objectors said that while they supported Christian unity, they could not support the United Christian Front, as it was mainly concerned with the Spanish Civil War and "adopts a view of it which seems to us ill-founded".

Ramsay became aware of a plan to hold a conference of freethinkers in London in 1938, which was being organised by the International Federation of Freethinkers. Together with his supporters in Parliament, he denounced this as a "Godless Conference", organised by a Moscow-based organisation. On 28 June 1938, he asked for permission to introduce as a Private Member's Bill the "Aliens Restriction (Blasphemy) Bill" to prohibit conference attendees from entering Britain; he won the vote by 165 to 134, but the bill went no further. Ramsay's opposition to communism led him to look to other countries for examples. On 13 January 1938, he had given a speech to the Arbroath Business Club in which he observed that Adolf Hitler's antipathy to Jews arose from his knowledge "that the real power behind the Third International is a group of revolutionary Jews".

Some time later in 1938, he read The Rulers of Russia by a reactionary Roman Catholic priest from Ireland, Father Denis Fahey, which contended that of 59 members of the Central Committee of the Communist Party of the Soviet Union in 1935, 56 were Jews, and the remaining three were married to Jews. Ramsay became a believer in anti-Semitic conspiracy theories and credited the Jews with being the guiding force behind the English Civil War with Oliver Cromwell acting as their agent against King Charles I. Ramsay also blamed the Jews for the French Revolution, the Russian Revolution and the Spanish Civil War. He became convinced as he put it that "Bolshevism is Jewish" and that Nazi Germany was the world's only hope as Hitler was the only world leader "who grasped to the full the significance of these happenings and perceived behind the mobs of native hooligans the organisation and driving power of World Jewry". At the same time, Ramsay was becoming ever more sympathetic to Germany; in September, he wrote to The Times to defend the right of the Sudetenland to self-determination.

On 15 November 1938, Ramsay was invited to a luncheon party at the German Embassy in London, where he met British sympathisers with Nazi Germany, including Barry Domvile. In December he introduced another Private Member's Bill called the "Companies Act (1929) Amendment Bill", which would require shares in news agencies and newspapers to be held openly and not through nominees. In his speech promoting the Bill, Ramsay claimed the press was being manipulated and controlled by "international financiers" based in New York City who wanted to "thrust this country into a war". Ramsay was given permission to introduce his Bill by 151 to 104; again it went no further.

== Controversy ==
On 10 January 1939 Ismay Ramsay gave another speech to the Arbroath Business Club, at which she claimed the national press was "largely under Jewish control", that "an international group of Jews ... were behind world revolution in every single country" and that Hitler "must ... have had his reasons for what he did". The speech was reported in the local newspaper and attracted the attention of the rabbi of the Edinburgh Hebrew Congregation, Salis Daiches, who wrote to The Scotsman challenging Mrs Ramsay to produce evidence. Ramsay wrote on her behalf citing Father Fahey's booklet, and the resulting correspondence lasted for nearly a month—including a letter from eleven ministers of the Church of Scotland in the County of Peebles repudiating the views of their MP.

Some members of Ramsay's local Unionist Association in Peebles were not pleased by what they considered negative publicity. However, Ramsay reassured them that he would continue to be a supporter of Neville Chamberlain and the National Government. Ramsay made attempts to make controversial speeches to private meetings rather than in public. On 27 April he spoke to a branch of the (antisemitic) Nordic League in Kilburn, London, attacking Neville Chamberlain for introducing conscription "at the instigation of the Jews" and claiming that the Conservative Party "relies on ... Jew money".

== The Right Club ==
After the controversy over Mrs Ramsay's January speech died down, Ramsay decided to influence others so that they would rid the Conservative and Unionist Party of its alleged Jewish control. To this end, he set up the Right Club in May 1939, noting down those who had joined in a red leather-bound and lockable ledger (the "Red Book"). There were 135 names on the men's list and 100 on a separate ladies' list; the members of the Right Club include a broad spectrum of those known to be antisemitic (including William Joyce and the Member of Parliament John Hamilton Mackie), those who were in some respects "fellow travellers" with antisemitism, and some friends of Ramsay who may have joined without knowing the actual functions of the club. Ramsay wrote in 1952: "The main object of the Right Club was to oppose and expose the activities of Organised Jewry in the light of the evidence which came into my possession in 1938... Our hope was to avert war, which we considered to be mainly the work of Jewish intrigue centred in New York". The founding of the Right Club in May 1939 was a direct response to the Danzig crisis, which had threatened war with Germany, and reflected Ramsay's unhappiness over the foreign policy of the Chamberlain government. Ramsay kept the membership of the Right Club a secret, but known members of the Right Club included William Joyce, Admiral Wilmot Nicholson, Frances Eckersley and Anna Wolkoff. At its early meetings, the 5th Duke of Wellington took the chair.

While Ramsay was attempting to launch the Right Club, he spoke at a meeting of the Nordic League at the Wigmore Hall at which a reporter from the Daily Worker was present and reported Ramsay as saying that they needed to end Jewish control, "and if we don't do it constitutionally, we'll do it with steel" – a statement greeted with wild applause. The popular magazine John Bull picked up on the report and challenged Ramsay to contradict it or explain himself. Ramsay's local newspaper, the Peeblesshire Advertiser, made the same challenge and Ramsay responded by admitting he had made the speech, citing the fact that three halls had refused to host the meeting as evidence of Jewish control. During the Danzig crisis, Ramsay was one of the few MPs who continued to defend Nazi Germany on the floor of the House of Commons even as Britain moved closer and closer to war with Germany as the crisis intensified in the summer of 1939. Griffiths noted that there had been other MPs who expressed pro-Nazi feelings before the crisis, but almost all of them chose to distance themselves from their past views in 1939 lest they lose their seats in the next general election, and Ramsay along with Cyril Culverwell were 'eccentric' MPs who continued to express such views, regardless of the damage they were doing to their re-election chances.

== Outbreak of war ==
On the second day of the Second World War for Britain, 4 September 1939, Ramsay sat in the library of the House of Commons writing a parody of Land of Hope and Glory, beginning: "Land of dope and Jewry". When the Secretary of State for War Leslie Hore-Belisha (a frequent target of antisemitism) was forced out of office, Ramsay distributed in the House of Commons copies of Truth (a magazine closely connected to Neville Chamberlain) which argued that Hore-Belisha was no loss to the government. He also put down a motion which cited the regretful reactions of many newspapers to Hore-Belisha's sacking as evidence of Jewish control of the press.

Privately, Ramsay had been invited to some of the "Secret Meetings" at which right-wing opponents of the war discussed tactics. However, after they came to be dominated by Sir Oswald Mosley and his supporters, Ramsay withdrew. The Right Club spent the Phoney War period distributing propaganda in the form of leaflets and 'sticky-backs' (adhesive labels containing slogans), with Ramsay later explaining that he wanted "to maintain the atmosphere in which the "Phoney War", as it was called, might be converted into an honourable negotiated peace." In addition to Ramsay's "Land of dope and Jewry"' rhyme, the slogans included "War destroys workers" and "This is a Jews' War". Some of the leaflets asserted "the stark truth is that this war was plotted and engineered by the Jews for world-power and vengeance". In his speeches both inside and outside of the House of Commons throughout the Phoney War, he called for a negotiated peace with Germany and blamed the war on "our Jew-ridden Press".

== House of Commons ==
In Parliament, Ramsay attacked the internment procedure of Defence Regulation 18B and opposed the arrest of antisemitic speaker Richard A. V. "Jock" Houston under the Public Order Act 1936. On 20 March 1940, he asked a question about a propaganda radio station set up by Germany which gave its precise wavelength, which was suspected by both his allies and opponents as a subtle way of advertising it. On 9 May he asked for an assurance from the Home Secretary "that he refuses to be stampeded ... by a ramp in our Jew-ridden press?" His increasingly open antisemitism was picked up by Labour members and others and referred to in debate. According to informants to British intelligence, Ramsay said he would welcome a fascist coup in the case of a German invasion: "Personally, I should welcome a civil war with shots fired in the streets."

== Internment ==
One of the last members to join the Right Club was Tyler Kent, a cypher clerk at the Embassy of the United States in London. Ramsay gave Kent the ledger containing the list of Right Club members for safe-keeping. Kent was stealing top-secret documents from the embassy to pass on to the Italian embassy and had already fallen under suspicion. Right from the outset of the war, the administration of President Franklin D. Roosevelt had leaned in a pro-Allied neutrality, and Roosevelt had persuaded Congress to amend the Neutrality Act in November 1939 to allow the United States to sell Britain and France weapons. Kent through his work as a cypher clerk at the American embassy in London, was aware of at least the Anglo-American end of the secret talks about how the United States could aid the Allies without entering the war. He became convinced that Roosevelt was plotting to bring the United States into the war because he was working for the Jews and contacted Ramsay about how best to stop the alleged plot, showing him excerpts from messages to and from Roosevelt and Churchill. Anna Wolkoff of the Right Club had tried to contact Joyce who was now in Germany working as the 'Lord Haw-Haw' radio speaker about the information received from Kent. Kent was observed by MI5 at the Cumberland Hotel handing over a mysterious package to Ludwig Matthias, a Swedish man suspected (correctly as it turned out) to be working for German intelligence. Kent was considered to be a high-level security threat owing to his ability to access the most secret Anglo-American diplomatic talks and placed under surveillance by MI5 as a major security threat, which proved damaging to Ramsay who was observed to be in constant contact with Kent.

On 20 May, after the US ambassador Joseph Kennedy had agreed to waive Kent's diplomatic immunity, his flat was raided and he was arrested; the locked Red Book was forced open. Ramsay's involvement with Kent was worrying to the authorities, as Ramsay enjoyed parliamentary privilege; if Kent had given the stolen documents to Ramsay and he had spoken about them in Parliament, it would have been impossible to prevent their publication. The Cabinet decided to extend Defence Regulation 18B to give more power to detain people suspected of disloyalty.

Ramsay was arrested and lodged in Brixton Prison on an order under Regulation 18B on 23 May 1940. He engaged solicitors (Oswald Hickson, Collier & Co.) through whom he attempted to defend his reputation. When Lord Marley said in the House of Lords that Ramsay was Hitler's chosen Gauleiter for Scotland in the event of an invasion, Oswald Hickson, Collier immediately sent off a letter of complaint.

As an 18B detainee, Ramsay's only lawful method of challenging his detention was to appeal to the Advisory Committee under Norman Birkett, but that recommended his continued detention. However, some of Ramsay's colleagues argued that as he was a Member of Parliament his detention was a breach of parliamentary privilege. The detention was referred to the Committee of Privileges, but on 9 October the committee reported that the detention was not a breach of privilege. Ramsay liked to proclaim himself a British super-patriot, but his wartime activities had made his "name synonymous with treason", and he become one of the most hated MPs during the war.

== Libel trial ==
The New York Times published an article on "Britain's Fifth Column" in July 1940 which claimed "informed American sources said that he had sent to the German legation in Dublin treasonable information given to him by Tyler Kent". Ramsay sued for libel, resulting in a trial in July 1941. He asserted his loyalty to Britain. However, some of Ramsay's answers did him damage; for example when asked if he wanted Nazism to be defeated, he replied, substituting "Germany" for "Nazism"; "Not only Germany, but also the Judaic menace". In summing-up, the judge said he was convinced Hitler would call Ramsay "friend" and that Ramsay was disloyal in heart and soul to his King, his Government, and the people.

However, The New York Times could not defend its story, having found no evidence that Ramsay had communicated anything to the German legation, and it was found liable. The judge awarded a farthing (¼d) in damages, the customary award for a libel plaintiff who technically won a case, but was adjudged to have brought his trouble on himself. If the defendant in a libel case pays into court beforehand a sum not less than the damages ultimately awarded, he is not liable for costs; as The New York Times had paid £75 into court, Ramsay became liable for both prosecution and defence costs. Another consequence of the trial was that Ramsay's local Unionist Association disowned him and asked another Member of Parliament, David Robertson, to undertake Ramsay's constituency work.

== Subsequent political activity ==
Ramsay continued occasionally to put down written parliamentary questions from jail, sometimes taking up the cases of fellow 18B internees. His eldest son Alec, serving in the Scots Guards, died of pneumonia on active service in South Africa in August 1943. Ramsay was released from detention on 26 September 1944, being one of the last few 18B detainees. He returned to Westminster to resume his seat in the Commons, causing at least one member to walk out of the chamber. His only significant action in the remainder of the parliament was a motion calling for the reinstatement of the 1275 Statute of the Jewry passed under King Edward I. He did not defend his seat in the 1945 general election. Peebles and Southern Midlothian was won by the Labour Party candidate David Pryde.

In 1952, Ramsay wrote The Nameless War as an autobiography and a plea to justify his actions. Much of the book consisted of an antisemitic conspiracy theory interpreting the English, French, Russian and Spanish Revolutions as part of a Jewish campaign for world domination. It quoted extensively from The Protocols of the Elders of Zion, the authenticity of which Ramsay took for granted, and added assertions including that Calvin had been a Jew whose real name was "Cohen", that Cromwell had been "a paid agent of the Jews" and that the entire English Civil War and the execution of Charles I were staged for the sole purpose of allowing Jews to return to England.

Ramsay attended some far-right political meetings but did not attract attention. He died in 1955.

== Sources ==
- Nicholson, Peter [writer and director]. Churchill and the Fascist Plot Channel 4 2011 TV documentary detailing how Winston Churchill and MI5 hunted down a group of British fascist aristocrats plotting to bring down the government and forge an alliance with Adolf Hitler.
- The Nameless War by Archibald Maule Ramsay (Britons Publishing Company, London, 1952) – text available online here
- Conspirator: The Untold Story of Churchill, Roosevelt and Tyler Kent, Spy by Ray Bearse and Anthony Read (Macmillan, London, 1991)
- Griffiths, Richard (1980). Fellow Travellers of the Right British Enthusiasts for Nazi Germany, 1933-9. London: Constable. ISBN 0571271324.
- Griffiths, Richard (2016). What Did You Do During the War?: The Last Throes of the British Pro-Nazi Right, 1940-45. London: Taylor & Francis.
- Griffiths, Richard (1998). Patriotism Perverted: Captain Ramsay, the Right Club and English Anti-semitism, 1939-40. London: Constable. ISBN 978-0-09-467920-7.

Parliament of the United Kingdom
Preceded by Joseph Westwood	Member of Parliament for Peebles and South Midlothian; 1931–1945	Succeeded by David Johnstone Pryde
