= Defence Regulation 18B =

Regulation issued by the British government during World War II

Defence Regulation 18B, often referred to as simply 18B, was one of the Defence Regulations used by the British Government before and during the Second World War. The complete name for the rule was Regulation 18B of the Defence (General) Regulations 1939. It allowed the internment without trial of people suspected of being actively opposed to the ongoing war with Germany during World War II such as separatist elements (for example Irish republicans suspected of involvement in the Sabotage Campaign) or were otherwise suspected of ideological Nazi-aligned sympathy (this included members of the British Union of Fascists and similar groups). The effect of 18B was to suspend the right of affected individuals to habeas corpus.

== Preparations for war ==
The Defence Regulations existed in draft form, constantly revised, throughout the years between the world wars. In early 1939 it was decided that since a war might break out without warning or without time to pass an Act of Parliament to bring in emergency regulations, the Regulations should be split into two codes. Code A would be needed immediately if war broke out and could be passed in peacetime, while Code B, containing more severe restrictions on civil liberties, would be brought in later. In order not to alert the public to the existence of Code B, Code A was simply numbered consecutively. Defence Regulation 18 concerned restrictions on movement of aircraft. It was originally intended that Code B would be imposed by an Order in Council, with retrospective indemnity being granted by an Act of Parliament should anyone dispute the actions of the authorities.

On 24 August 1939, after tensions rose over Poland, the House of Commons was recalled from its summer recess to pass the Emergency Powers (Defence) Act, which gave authority to implement the Defence Regulations. Code A was brought into effect that day and Code B followed on 1 September. Enemy aliens were detained using powers under the royal prerogative, while 18B was used mainly for British subjects.

== Text of the Regulation ==
- (1) If the Secretary of State has reasonable cause to believe any person to be of hostile origin or associations or to have been recently concerned in acts prejudicial to the public safety or the defence of the realm or in the preparation or instigation of such acts and that by reason thereof it is necessary to exercise control over him, he may make an order against that person directing that he be detained.
- (1A) If the Secretary of State has reasonable cause to believe any person to have been or to be a member of, or to have been or to be active in the furtherance of the objects of, any such organisation as is hereinafter mentioned, and that it is necessary to exercise control over him, he may make an order against that person directing that he be detained. The organisations hereinbefore referred to are any organisation as respects which the Secretary of State is satisfied that either—
  - (a) the organisation is subject to foreign influence or control, or
  - (b) the persons in control of the organisation have or have had associations with persons concerned in the government of, or sympathies with the system of government of, any Power with which His Majesty is at war.
  and in either case that there is danger of the utilisation of the organisation for purposes prejudicial to the public safety, the defence of the realm, the maintenance of public order, the efficient " prosecution of any war in which His Majesty may be engaged or the maintenance of supplies or services essential to the life of the community.
- (2) At any time after an order has been made against any person under this Regulation, the Secretary of State may direct that the operation of the order be suspended subject to such conditions—
  - (a) prohibiting or restricting the possession or use by that person of any specified articles;
  - (b) imposing upon him such restrictions as may be specified in the direction in respect of his employment or business, in respect of the place of his residence, and in respect of his association or communication with other persons;
  - (c) requiring him to notify his movements in such manner, at such times, and to such authority or person as may be so specified;
  - (d) prohibiting him from travelling except in accordance with permission given to him by such authority or person as may be so specified;
  as the Secretary of State thinks fit; and the Secretary of State may revoke any such direction if he is satisfied that the person against whom the order was made has failed to observe any condition so imposed, or that the operation of the order can no longer remain suspended without detriment to the public safety or the defence of the realm.
- (3) For the purposes of this Regulation, there shall be one or more advisory committees consisting of persons appointed by the Secretary of State; and any person aggrieved by the making of an order against him, by a refusal of the Secretary of State to suspend the operation of such an order, by any condition attached to a direction given by the Secretary of State or by the revocation of any such direction, under the powers conferred by this Regulation, may make his objections to such a committee.
- (4) It shall be the duty of the Secretary of State to secure that any person against whom an order is made under this Regulation shall be afforded the earliest practicable opportunity of making to the Secretary of State representations in writing with respect thereto and that he shall be informed of his right, whether or not such representations are made, to make his objections to such an advisory committee as aforesaid.
- (5) Any meeting of an advisory committee held to consider such objections as aforesaid shall be presided over by a chairman nominated by the Secretary of State and it shall be the duty of the chairman to inform the objector of the grounds on which the order has been made against him and to furnish him with such particulars as are in the opinion of the chairman sufficient to enable him to present his case.
- (6) The Secretary of State shall make a report to Parliament at least once in every month as to the action taken under this Regulation (including the number of persons detained under orders made thereunder) and as to the number of cases, if any, in which he has declined to follow the advice of any such advisory committee as aforesaid.
- (7) If any person fails to comply with a condition attached to a direction given by the Secretary of State under paragraph (2) of this Regulation that person shall, whether or not the direction is revoked in consequence of the failure, be guilty of an offence against this Regulation.
- (8) Any person detained in pursuance of this Regulation shall be deemed to be in lawful custody and shall be detained in such place as may be authorised by the Secretary of State and in accordance with instructions issued by him.

== 18B in force ==
The initial arrests were few and confined to those believed to be hard-core Nazis. By 14 September 1939 there were only 14 people interned under 18B. Several of these were German or Austrian by birth but had been naturalised as British subjects. The total would have been higher if William Joyce had not been tipped off by an MI5 officer, who appears to have been Maxwell Knight, about his impending internment, allowing him to flee to Germany.

In the Commons a group of Labour and Liberal MPs attempted to have Code B annulled on 31 October 1939, but were persuaded to withdraw their motion in favour of consultation that produced slightly amended wording.

== Expansion in May 1940 ==
The authorities dramatically revised their approach to the British far right in the late spring of 1940. The recent rapid seizure of power in Norway by Vidkun Quisling raised the possibility of a fifth column deposing the British government. The fall of the Low Countries and the invasion of France led to fear of invasion. Then on 20 May 1940 a raid on the home of Tyler Kent, a cypher clerk at the U.S. Embassy, revealed that Kent had stolen copies of thousands of telegrams, including those between Winston Churchill and Franklin Roosevelt. Kent was an associate of Archibald Maule Ramsay, an openly antisemitic MP. This opened the possibility that Ramsay might use parliamentary privilege to reveal the telegrams, which Churchill had not told the Cabinet about. It would also reveal Roosevelt was trying to help Churchill while proclaiming his support for neutrality in public. The Cabinet decided in favour of widespread detentions of the far right on 22 May. This required an amended version of the Regulation, known as 18B (1A).

One of the first to be arrested, in the early morning of 23 May, was Sir Oswald Mosley. Others arrested later included Admiral Sir Barry Domvile, Sir Reginald Goodall and Leigh Vaughan-Henry. Popular reaction was strongly in favour, and one reader wrote to The Times to note with satisfaction that news of Mosley's arrest had been carried in the fifth column of the page. By December 1940 there were more than a thousand detainees in custody.

== Life for 18B detainees ==
A person subject to 18B would be arrested without warning. Some were in the forces and were arrested while on parade. They would be taken first to police cells and then to prison. The first detainees were sent to HM Prison Wandsworth for men and HM Prison Holloway for women, but the men were later moved to HM Prison Brixton. With the expansion in numbers in 1940 came a shortage of prison accommodation, so some derelict wings of prisons (including Stafford and Liverpool women's prison) were brought back into use to house internees.

Eventually it was decided to hold the internees in camps. The winter quarters of Bertram Mills's circus provided one camp at Ascot Racecourse, and uncompleted council housing at Huyton near Liverpool was used from March 1941. Finally the authorities solved the accommodation problem, both for 18B internees and for interned enemy aliens by setting up camps on the Isle of Man. A new Act of Parliament, the Isle of Man (Detention) Act 1941, was needed to authorise the transfer. The men stayed at Peveril Camp, Peel, and the women at Rushen Camp, Port Erin. A small number of designated leaders remained in Wandsworth Prison throughout, for greater security. In a few cases husbands and wives who had both been interned were later allowed to live together.

The regime in the camps was relatively liberal. Free association was permitted and there were some entertainments, even including trips to cinemas.

== Legal process and challenging detention ==
There were two justifications for an order to intern: "acts prejudicial to the public safety" and "hostile origin or associations." A detainee could challenge their detention by way of an appeal to an Advisory Committee headed by Norman Birkett. The committee would be presented with a statement of the reasons why detention had been proposed, drawn up by MI5, which the detainee was not permitted to see. The committee could recommend continued detention, release under conditions or unconditional release. The committee's recommendations went to the Home Secretary, who was not bound to accept them, and MI5 often lobbied him not to accept a recommendation to release.

Some detainees attempted to take further action through the courts. Challenges were brought on the basis of habeas corpus, but refused on the grounds that the Home Secretary had taken his decision to intern on the basis of reports that had to be kept secret, and that he had reasonable cause to sign the internment orders. The most significant case was Liversidge v Anderson, brought by Robert W. Liversidge who was a successful Jewish businessman and therefore a highly atypical 18B internee. He brought a civil action for damages for false imprisonment, but did not apply for habeas corpus. It was ultimately decided that where it is required in law that a minister "has reasonable cause to believe" something before acting, a court can inquire into whether he really did believe it, but not into whether the things causing this belief were true. Lord Atkin wrote a dissent from this judgment.

Archibald Maule Ramsay, the only MP detained, had the matter referred to the House of Commons Committee on Privileges for a ruling as to whether the detention of an MP was a breach of the Privilege of Parliament. The committee decided that it was not.

== Abolition of 18B internments ==
Fear of immediate invasion subsided after the Battle of Britain and the number of 18B internees slowly decreased as those of least concern were released. From a peak of about 1,000 in 1940, by summer 1943 there were fewer than 500. Oswald Mosley, who was said to be suffering from phlebitis, was released on 23 November 1943, to a great deal of public criticism. The Council for Civil Liberties demanded his continued imprisonment.

The invasion of France on D-Day again lifted pressure and by the end of 1944 only 65 internees under Regulation 18B remained, most of whom were naturalised German-born citizens. By the time Adolf Hitler killed himself there were 11 and by V-E Day there was only one. 18B ceased to have effect a few days later.

== See also ==
- Opposition to World War II
- United States Executive Order 9066, order for internment of U.S. citizens of Japanese descent

== Bibliography ==
- Simpson, A. W. Brian (1994). In the Highest Degree Odious. Oxford: Oxford University Press. ISBN 0-19-825775-9.
