= Anna Wolkoff =

British-Russian spy (1902–1973)

Anna Nikolayevna Wolkova (Russian: Анна Николаевна Волкова; 17 April 1902 – 2 August 1973), sometimes known as Anna de Wolkoff, was a White Russian émigrée and convicted spy. She was secretary of The Right Club, which was opposed to Britain's involvement in World War II. Her arrest for spying for Germany interrupted plans for a fascist coup by the Right Club.

== Early life ==
She was the eldest child of Admiral Nikolai Wolkoff (1870–1954) who was the last Imperial Russian naval attaché in London. Her family had decided to stay in Britain in the aftermath of the Bolshevik Revolution, and they became naturalised British subjects on 10 September 1935. In 1923 the Wolkoffs opened the Russian Tea Rooms, at 50 Harrington Road, South Kensington, near the Natural History Museum, a rendezvous point for other White Russians.

Anna and her father held right-wing, antisemitic views and were considered sympathizers of Nazi Germany, which she visited several times in the 1930s. She later claimed to have met Hans Frank and Rudolf Hess.

Her visits caused MI5 to take an interest in her activities and from 1935, she was placed under surveillance as a possible German spy. Wallis Simpson was a client of her couture business and also was under surveillance by British counterintelligence.

== The Right Club ==
Wolkoff belonged to "one of many small anti-semitic associations in Britain", the Right Club, an antiwar movement with a membership of about 350. The club had been founded by Captain Archibald Maule Ramsay, MP, who later stressed his patriotism in the House of Commons and said that there was a distinction between antisemitism and pro-Nazism.

Other members included William Joyce (briefly), who then defected to Germany as a broadcaster, A. K. Chesterton, later the author of The New Unhappy Lords, Francis Yeats-Brown, best-selling author of Bengal Lancer, Admiral Wilmot Nicholson and his wife Christabel, and the Duke of Wellington. The club's members often held their meetings in the Russian Tea Rooms. In his autobiography, The Nameless War, Ramsay argued: "The main object of the Right Club was to oppose and expose the activities of Organised Jewry, in the light of the evidence which came into my possession in 1938. Our first objective was to clear the Conservative Party of Jewish influence and the character of our membership and meetings were strictly in keeping with this objective".

== Espionage ==
When Britain went to war against Germany in September 1939, the Right Club officially disbanded but some members continued their antiwar activities. Wolkoff, using Assistant Military Attaché Col. Francesco Marigliano, an intermediary from the Italian embassy, sent information to Berlin, including suggestions for Joyce's propaganda broadcasts. The Right Club had been infiltrated early on by MI5, first by Marjorie Mackie (née Amor), "a stout, middle-aged single mother from Essex", and then by young Belgian mystic Helene De Muncke, as well as by Joan Miller, a young undercover agent who had worked as an office girl for Elizabeth Arden. Through these women, controlled by head of MI5 Section B(5)b Maxwell Knight, MI5 was kept informed of and was able even to influence the activities of the group.

In February 1940, Wolkoff met Tyler Kent, a cipher clerk from the US embassy with similar views, who became a regular visitor to the Right Club. Kent later revealed to Wolkoff and Ramsay some of the documents that he had stolen from the embassy and was holding in his flat, notably on sensitive communications between Winston Churchill and Franklin Roosevelt. On 13 April 1940, Wolkoff went to Kent's flat to borrow some of the documents to have them photographed, as it emerged later. Her espionage work took a downturn when she then approached De Muncke and asked her if she could pass a coded letter to William Joyce through her Italian embassy contacts. De Muncke agreed and then showed the letter to Knight.

== Arrest and trial ==
Wolkoff and Kent were arrested on 20 May 1940 and charged under the Official Secrets Act. As she was put into the police car, her arrest was witnessed by 11-year-old Len Deighton. She was tried in camera at the Old Bailey, with Sir William Jowitt as prosecutor. On 7 November 1940, Wolkoff was sentenced to 10 years' imprisonment for "attempting to assist the enemy" and Kent, an American citizen, was sentenced to 7 years in prison. The two narrowly avoided execution since their crimes had been committed barely a month before the Treachery Act 1940 was passed. The Treachery Act imposed death sentences for acts which aided the enemy. After Wolkoff's conviction, the Certificates of Naturalisation (Revocation) Committee was contacted and her citizenship was revoked on 13 August 1943.

Wolkoff's arrest interrupted Ramsay's plans for a fascist coup that would have taken place if German troops had landed on British soil. In anticipation of the coup, Ramsay infiltrated Right Club informants into the police, MI5, the Minister of Economic Warfare, the Air Ministry censorship branch, Churchill's war cabinet, and the top-secret codebreaking facility then working on the Enigma decryption.

== Release and death ==
Wolkoff was released from prison in 1947 and worked as a seamstress, lodging in the house of Felix Hope-Nicholson. She was killed in a road accident in Spain in 1973 in a car driven by Enid Riddell, another former member of the Right Club.
