= Tyler Kent =

American diplomat and convicted criminal (1911–1988)

Tyler Gatewood Kent
- Born: March 24, 1911; Newchwang, Manchuria
- Died: November 20, 1988 (aged 77); Kerrville, Texas, United States
- Resting place: East End Cemetery, Wytheville, Virginia
- Education: St. Albans School, Washington, D.C.
- Alma mater: Princeton University
- Employer: U.S. Foreign Service
- Known for: Conviction for espionage
- Status: Deceased
- Conviction: Offences under the Official Secrets Acts
- Penalty: 7 years imprisonment

Tyler Gatewood Kent (March 24, 1911 – November 20, 1988) was an American diplomat who stole thousands of secret documents while working as a cipher clerk at the US Embassy in London during World War II.

== Early life and career ==
Kent was born in Newchwang, Manchuria, where his father was the US Consul. He was educated at St. Albans School in Washington, D.C., followed by Princeton University where he studied history, George Washington University, the Sorbonne (where he studied Russian) and the University of Madrid. Through his father's connections, he joined the State Department and was posted to Moscow under William C. Bullitt, the first American ambassador to the Soviet Union. There he was promoted to cipher clerk.

By 1939, he was suspected of engaging in espionage for the Soviet Union, but lacking any solid evidence, the Diplomatic Service decided to transfer him to the embassy in London, where he began working on October 5, 1939. With a position that required him to encode and decode sensitive telegrams, Kent had access to a wide range of secret documents.

== In London ==
As soon as Kent arrived in London, he was seen in the company of Ludwig Matthias, a suspected German agent who was being tailed by detectives of Scotland Yard's Special Branch. He was observed being a frequent guest of the Russian Tea Room in South Kensington, a resort of White Russians led by Admiral Nikolai Wolkoff, the former naval attaché for Imperial Russia in London, and his wife, a former maid of honor to the Tsarina. Through one of their daughters, Anna Wolkoff, Kent met Irene Danishewsky, wife of a British merchant who was a frequent visitor to the Soviet Union. She became Kent's mistress. Because of their background, Irene and her husband were placed under surveillance by MI5 as possible Soviet spies.

Kent was also becoming active in politics. His views are uncertain, but many have assumed that he took an isolationist line and that he was prepared to help British anti-war campaigns. Early in 1940, through Anna Wolkoff, he met Archibald Maule Ramsay, an antisemitic Conservative Member of Parliament, and joined Ramsay's group The Right Club. Ramsay gave Kent, who had diplomatic immunity, the Right Club's membership list for safekeeping.

Kent later invited Wolkoff and Ramsay to his flat and showed them the stolen documents. He would later claim that he showed them to Ramsay in the hope that the latter would pass them to politicians hostile to Roosevelt. Anna Wolkoff made copies of some of these documents on April 13 and sent them to Berlin through an intermediary from the Italian Embassy. It was subsequently found, through interception of wireless messages by MI8, that they then came into the possession of Vice Admiral Wilhelm Canaris, head of the Abwehr.

Wolkoff approached fellow Right Club member Joan Miller and asked her if she could pass a coded letter to William Joyce (later 'Lord Haw-Haw'), through her contacts at the Italian embassy, not knowing that Miller was an undercover agent for MI5 and directly under the supervision of its head of counter-subversion, Maxwell Knight. Miller agreed to take the letter, but instead of taking it to the Italian embassy, she showed it to Knight.

== Arrest, trial and conviction ==
On May 18, 1940, the US ambassador Joseph P. Kennedy Sr. was informed of this development and agreed to waive Kent's diplomatic immunity. On May 20, Kent was arrested under the Official Secrets Act in a dawn raid at his flat. Officers of MI5 found 1,929 official documents there, and besides Churchill's cables was a book containing the names of people under surveillance by Special Branch and MI5. Searchers also found keys to the US embassy code room. Anna Wolkoff was arrested on the same day and charged with violating the same Act.

On May 31, after 11 days of secret detention, the US State Department announced that Kent had been fired and "detained by order of the Home Secretary" but not that he had been arrested under the Official Secrets Act.

On October 23, Kent was tried in camera at the Old Bailey. Brown paper was pasted on the windows and glass door panels. He was specifically charged with obtaining documents that "might be directly or indirectly useful to an enemy" and letting Wolkoff have them in her possession. He was also accused of stealing documents that were the property of Ambassador Kennedy. The only spectators allowed at the trial were official observers, including Malcolm Muggeridge, representing MI6. Two of the witnesses against Kent were Maxwell Knight and Archibald Ramsay, who was interned on the Isle of Man under Defence Regulation 18B because he had seen the documents. British officials who had knowledge of the documents believed that if they had come to light at that time, Anglo-American relations would have been seriously damaged, for they showed that Roosevelt was looking at ways to evade the Neutrality Acts to help Britain survive a German onslaught. This would also have damaged Roosevelt's re-election bid for the presidency that year.

At his trial, Kent also admitted he had taken documents from the US Embassy in Moscow, with the vague notion of someday showing them to US senators who shared his isolationist, antisemitic views. He said he burned the Moscow documents before being assigned to London. It was learned later that he had fallen in love with an interpreter who worked for the NKVD, thus fueling speculations that he had Soviet contacts.

On November 7, 1940, Kent was convicted and sentenced to seven years' imprisonment. He and Wolkoff narrowly avoided execution since their crimes had been committed barely a month before the Treachery Act 1940 was passed. The Treachery Act imposed death sentences for acts which aided the enemy. Isolationist groups in the United States claimed he had been framed and that the trial was an attempted cover-up of an attempt to get the US to join the war. The documents, finally released in 1972, did not support this claim. The papers that Kent had purloined indicated British-American naval co-operation, but they also showed that Roosevelt was not prepared to go further without support from the US Congress or the public.

== Later years ==
At the end of the war, Kent was released from prison in October 1945. He was then deported to the United States. He never changed his beliefs, insisting that he had always been a staunch anti-communist. After marrying a wealthy woman, he became a publisher of a pro-segregation Florida newspaper with links to the Ku Klux Klan. He condemned President John F. Kennedy as a communist, and charged that Kennedy was killed by communists because he was abandoning his communist leanings. Kent would later join the Liberty Lobby.

According to Ray Bearse and Anthony Read, despite Kent's stated anti-communist beliefs, officials in the FBI believed him to be a secret Soviet sympathizer. He was the subject of six FBI investigations from 1952 to 1963, all ending inconclusively.

Kent died in Kerrville, Texas, in 1988.

== Bibliography ==
- Ray Bearse and Anthony Read, Conspirator: The Untold Story of Tyler Kent (New York: Doubleday, 1991).
- Clough, Bryan. State Secrets: The Kent-Wolkoff Affair. East Sussex: Hideaway Publications Ltd., 2005. ISBN 0-9525477-3-2
- Warren Kimball and Bruce Bartlett, "Roosevelt and Prewar Commitments to Churchill: The Tyler Kent Affair", Diplomatic History, vol. 5, no. 4 (Fall 1981), pp. 291–311.
- Peter Nicholson (director), Churchill and the Fascist Plot, Channel 4 (UK), 16 March 2013 television documentary.
