= List of University of Edinburgh medical people =

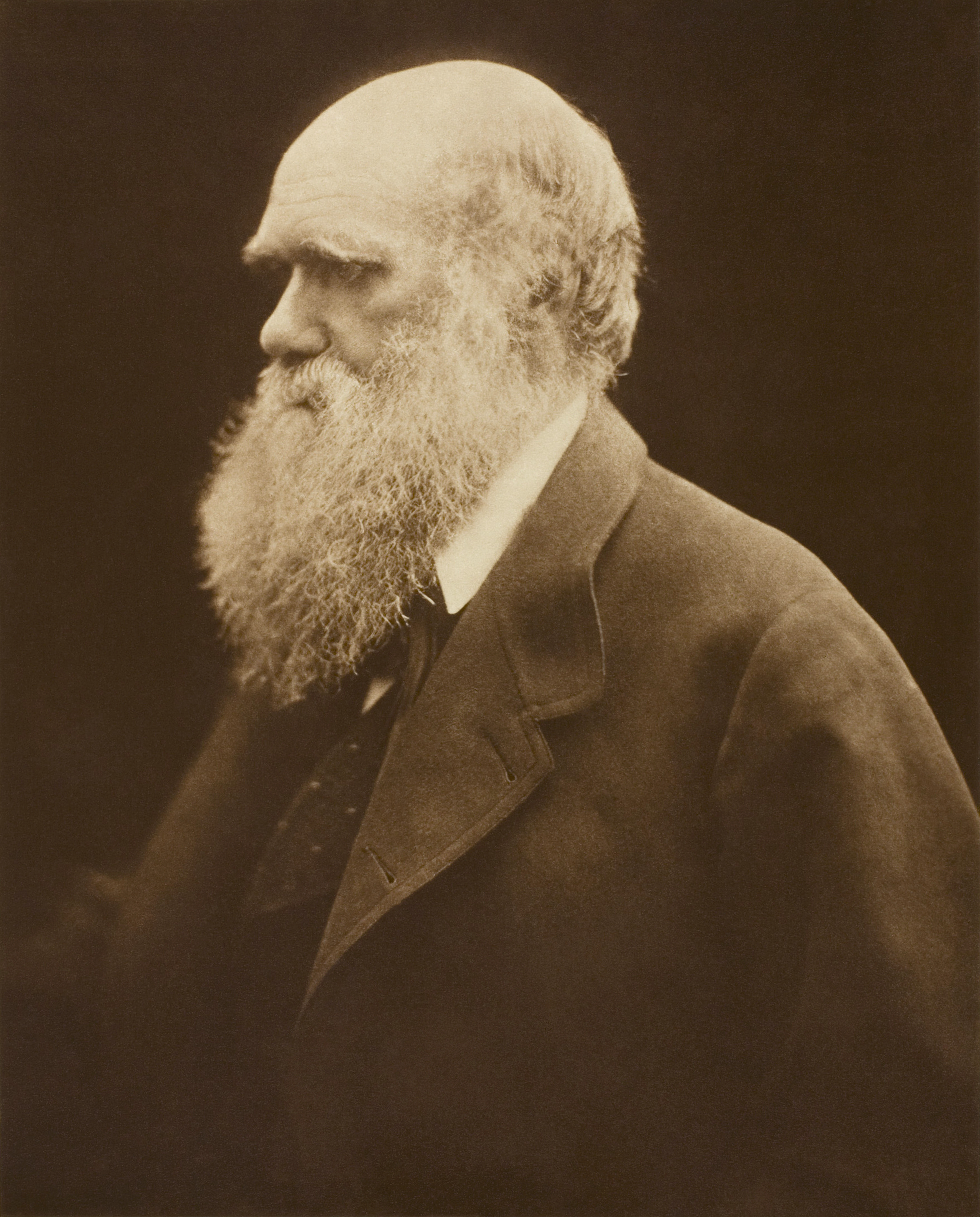
Charles Darwin was a student at the University of Edinburgh Medical School from 1825 to 1827.

List of University of Edinburgh medical people is a list of notable graduates as well as non-graduates, and academic staffs of the University of Edinburgh Medical School in Scotland.

== Pioneers in medicine ==
Name	Class year	Notability	Reference(s)
Thomas Addis	MB 1905, ChB 1905, MD 1908	Scottish-American physician, described the pathogenesis of haemophilia as well as the concept of renal clearance, demonstrated that normal blood plasma could correct the defect in haemophilia	
Thomas Addison	MD 1815	English physician, discovered Addison's disease, pernicious anemia and Addison-Schilder syndrome	
William John Adie	MB 1911, ChB 1911, MD 1926	British physician, described Adie syndrome and narcolepsy	
Arthur Cecil Alport	MB 1905, ChB 1905, MD 1919	South African physician, described Alport syndrome	
Thomas Annandale	MD 1860, Regius Chair of Clinical Surgery 1877–1907	Scottish surgeon, performed the first repair of the meniscus, the first successful removal of an acoustic neuroma and introduced the pre-peritoneal approach to inguinal hernia repair	
Martin Barry	MD 1823	English pathologist, discovered the segmentation of yolk in the mammalian ovum and demonstrated that sperm could be found inside the ovum	
Edward Baxter	1877	Pioneer medical missionary to East Africa, Church Missionary Society, hunter, guide to first 'Ladies Mission'	
Sir George Beatson	MD 1878	Surgical oncologist who pioneered oophorectomy, the removal of the ovaries in the treatment of breast cancer	
James Begbie	MD 1821	Scottish physician, first described Graves' Disease, also known as Begbie's disease, President of the Royal College of Physicians of Edinburgh	
Benjamin Bell	1767	Scottish surgeon, father of Edinburgh's school of surgery, a significant advocate of the 'dualist doctrine' suggesting syphilis and gonorrhea were not the same disease	
Charles Bell	MD 1798	Scottish anatomist and neurologist, discovered Bell's palsy and the functions of the roots of the spinal nerves	
John Hughes Bennett	MD 1837	English physician, first to describe aspergillosis and first identified leukaemia as a blood disorder	
James Blundell	MD 1813	English obstetrician, performed the first successful human to human blood transfusion	
Richard Bright	MD 1813	English physician, discovered Bright's disease, known as the "father of nephrology"	
David Bruce	MB 1881, CM 1881	Scottish pathologist, identified the cause of sleeping sickness and discovered Malta fever and brucellosis	
Sir Thomas Lauder Brunton	BSc 1867, MD 1768, DSc 1870	Discovered organic nitrates had the ability to alleviate angina pectoris	
William Budd	MD 1838	Scottish physician, first recognized that infectious disease was contagious and could be spread through feces	
John Murray Carnochan	1834	American neurosurgeon, performed the world's first successful surgery for trigeminal neuralgia	
John Cheyne	MD 1795	Scottish physician, discovered Cheyne-Stokes respiration, Physician General to the British Armed Forces in Ireland	
Matilda J. Clerk	MBChB 1949	First Ghanaian woman to win an academic merit scholarship for university education abroad and second Ghanaian woman to qualify as a physician	
Ezekiel Quarmina Allotey Cofie	LDS, RCS Ed. 1949	First Ghanaian dental surgeon	
Abraham Colles	MD 1797	Irish physician, discovered and described the Colles' fracture, Colles' fascia and Colles' ligament	
Dominic Corrigan	MD 1825	Irish physician, described Corrigan's pulse and was Liberal MP for Dublin	
Peter C. Doherty	PhD 1970	Australian veterinary surgeon, discovered how T cells recognise antigens in combination with major histocompatibility complex proteins, awarded the 1996 Nobel Prize in Physiology or Medicine	
Cuthbert Dukes	MD 1914	English pathologist, devised the Dukes classification system for colorectal cancer	
Charles Odamtten Easmon	MBChB 1940, DTM&H 1941	first Ghanaian surgeon and the first Dean of the University of Ghana Medical School	
Richard Eastell	MB 1977, ChB 1977, MD 1984	British physician, pioneered treatments in osteoporosis	
Robert Edwards	PhD 1955	British physiologist, developed in-vitro fertilisation (IVF), awarded the 2010 Nobel Prize in Physiology or Medicine	
John Fothergill	MD 1736	Scottish physician, first identified and named trigeminal neuralgia	
Thomas Richard Fraser	MD 1862, Professor of Medicine 1877–1918	Scottish physician, described the calabar bean and the strophanthus hispidus	
Ian Frazer	BSc 1974, MB 1977, ChB 1977	Scottish-Australian physician, discovered the link between HPV and cervical cancer, co-invented the HPV vaccine for cervical cancer, CEO and Director of Research at the Translational Institute of Research, University of Queensland	
David Ferrier	MB 1868, CM 1868, MD 1870	Scottish neurologist, mapped the cortical function of the brain, the idea that specific areas of the brain are associated with specific behaviours	
Valentín Fuster	PhD 1971, Research Fellow 1968–71	Prominent Spanish cardiologist, only cardiologist to receive the two highest gold medals and all four major research awards from the world's four major cardiovascular organizations, named as "one of the best doctors in America and New York" since 1992, leader of the CNIC-Ferrer polypill project, demonstrated platelets' role in CABG occlusion	
Olivier James Garden	BSc 1974 MB 1977, ChB 1977, MD 1987, FRCS (Edin) 1994, Regius Chair of Clinical Surgery 2000-present	British surgeon, performed the first liver transplant in Scotland in 1992, president of the International Hepato-Pancreto-Biliary Association 2012–14	
Robert Marcus Gunn	MB 1873, CM 1873	Scottish ophthalmologist, discovered Gunn's Sign and the Marcus Gunn pupil	
John Scott Haldane	MB 1884, CM 1884	Scottish physiologist, invented the decompression chamber, first proposed placing a "canary in the coal mine" to warn of dangerous carbon monoxide levels, international authority on ether and respiration, discovered the Haldane effect on hemoglobin	
George Harley	MD 1850	Scottish physician, demonstrated that the colour of urine was due to urobilin	
Percy Theodore Herring	MB 1896, CM 1896, MD 1899	English physician, discovered Herring bodies	
William Hewson	1762	English surgeon, isolated fibrin, known as the "father of haematology"	
Henry Hill Hickman	1820	Scottish general practitioner, considered one of the "fathers of anesthesia", first experimented with carbon dioxide as anaesthesia on dogs	
Thomas Hodgkin	MD 1823	English pathologist, described Hodgkin's lymphoma	
James Hope	MD 1825	English physician, discovered the murmur of mitral stenosis	
Thomas Wharton Jones	1827	Scottish ophthalmologist, discovered the germinal vesicle in the mammalian ovum and described the origin of the chorion	
Matthew Kaufman	MB 1967, ChB 1967, Prof. Anatomy 1987–2007, Prof. Emeritus 2008–13, FRS (Edin) 2008	British physician, first to derive embryonic stem cells from mouse embryos	
George Kellie	MD 1803	Scottish surgeon, described the Monro-Kellie doctrine on intracranial pressure	
Thomas Aitchison Latta	MD 1819	Scottish general practitioner, responsible for the introduction of the saline solution (saline drip) methodology	
James Lind	MD 1748	Scottish military surgeon, pioneer of naval hygiene, conducted the first ever clinical trial, developed cure for scurvy and typhus, first proposed fresh water could be obtained from distilling sea water	
Robert Liston	1815	Scottish surgeon, inventor of artery forceps and the Liston knife, known as "the fastest surgeon alive"	
Sir Henry Littlejohn	MD 1847, Prof. Medical Jurisprudence 1897–1906	Scottish surgeon and public health officer, developed IV saline injection for cholera, Edinburgh's first Medical Officer of Health and co-founded the Royal Hospital for Sick Children	
B. K. Misra	PDC 1984-'87	Indian neurosurgeon, first neurosurgeon in the world to perform image-guided surgery for aneurysms, first in South Asia to perform stereotactic radiosurgery, first in India to perform awake craniotomy and laparoscopic spine surgery.	
Alexander Monro	MD 1755, Prof. Anatomy and Surgery 1754–98	Scottish physician and anatomist, described the lymphatic system, elucidated the musculo-skeletal system, described the foramen of Monro, described the Monro-Kellie doctrine on intracranial pressure	
James Rutherford Morison	MB 1874, CM 1874	Scottish surgeon, discovered Morison's pouch	
Susan Ofori-Atta	MBChB 1947	First Ghanaian woman to train as a physician	
Sir William Brooke O'Shaughnessy	MD 1829	Irish physician, introduced cannabis (medical marijuana) into Western medicine, inventor of IV therapy, pioneered work on telegraphy and installed 3500 miles of telegraph lines in India	
Philip Syng Physick	MD 1792	American surgeon, "father of American surgery", pioneered the use of the stomach pump, designed needle forceps	
Isabella Pringle	MBChB 1909	Scottish physician and pioneer of child health	
James Hogarth Pringle	MB 1885, CM 1885	Scottish surgeon, developed the Pringle manoeuvre, a technique of occluding the portal triad to control hemorrhage, first surgeon in Britain to carry out a saphenous vein graft, pioneered the hindquarter amputation	
John Reid	MD 1830	Scottish physician, described the function of the glossopharyngeal and vagus nerves	
Agnes Yewande Savage	MD 1929	Scottish-Nigerian physician, first woman of West African heritage to qualify in orthodox medicine	
Randy Schekman	Exchange student 1970	American cell biologist, discovered cell membrane trafficking, discovered machinery regulating vesicle traffic, awarded the 2013 Nobel Prize in Physiology or Medicine	
Edward Henry Sieveking	MD 1841	English physician, pioneer in epilepsy treatments, invented the aesthesiometer, used to measure two-point discrimination, Physician to King Edward VII	
Sir James Young Simpson	MD 1832	Discovered chloroform anaesthesia in 1847, revolutionising obstetric and surgical practice	
James Spence	1832, Prof. Systemic Surgery 1864–82	Scottish surgeon, President of the Royal College of Surgeons Edinburgh, the tail of Spence is named after him	
Graham Steell	MB 1872, CM 1872, MD 1877	Described the Graham Steell murmur	
Sir Thomas Grainger Stewart	MD 1858, Prof. Medicine 1876–1900	Scottish physician, described multiple neuritis	
Harold Stiles	MB 1885, CM 1885, FRCS (Edin) 1889	British surgeon, known for research in tuberculosis and breast cancer, performed first pyloromyotomy	
William Stokes	MD 1825	Irish physician, discovered Cheyne-Stokes respiration and Stokes-Adams syndrome	
John Struthers	MD 1845	Scottish anatomist, discovered and described the vestigial organ Ligament of Struthers which was used by Charles Darwin to argue the case for evolution	
Mary Broadfoot Walker	MD 1935	Scottish physician, demonstrated the effectiveness of physostigmine in the treatment of myasthenia gravis	
John Collins Warren	MD 1801	American surgeon, performed the first surgery under ether anesthesia in 1846, first dean of Harvard Medical School, co-founder of Massachusetts General Hospital	
John Clarence Webster	MB 1888, CM 1888	Canadian OB/GYN, known for the Baldy-Webster operation to retrovert the uterus by shortening the round ligaments	
William Charles Wells	MD 1780	Scottish-American physician, known for the first description of acute rheumatic fever	
Patrick Heron Watson	MD 1853	Scottish surgeon, pioneer of anaesthetic development, advocate of women training in medicine	
Robert Willan	MD 1780	English physician, founder of the speciality dermatology, described several dermatological diseases including impetigo, lupus, psoriasis, scleroderma, erythema infectiosum and ichthyosis	
Samuel Wilson	MB 1902, ChB 1902, BSc 1903, MD 1912	British neurologist, described Wilson's disease	
Gordon Wishart	MB 1983, ChB 1983, MD 1992	British breast surgeon, identified P-glycoprotein in breast cancer, introduced early patient discharge following breast surgery, pioneered minimally invasive parathyroid surgery, pioneered pre-operative axillary lymph node breast cancer staging	
William Withering	MD 1766	English botanist and physician, discovered digoxin	
Alexander Wood	MD 1839	Scottish physician, invented the first hypodermic syringe	
William Cleaver Woods	MB 1882, ChM 1882, MD 1882	British Australian, physician, politician and pioneer in Australian medical science specializing in X-rays for diagnostic applications and perhaps the first in the world to utilize X-rays for the treatment of cancer Dr. Kadambini Ganguly: First woman student of Calcutta Medical College, first practicing woman doctor of India and first western medical trained woman doctor of South Asia and whole of the British colonial countries	
Guy Alfred Wyon	MD with distinction 1915	One of the 1916–1917 team which resolved the issue of potentially-fatal TNT poisoning in British World War I shell factories, preventing further deaths of female employees	
Nanshan Zhong	MD 1981	Chinese pulmonologist, discovered the SARS virus in 2003, President of the Chinese Medical Association	

== Founders of medical schools and universities ==
Name	Class year	Notability	Reference(s)
Francis Badgley	MD 1829	Co-founder and professor of the Université de Montréal Faculty of Medicine	
Samuel Bard	MD 1765	Founder and President of the Columbia University College of Physicians and Surgeons, described diphtheria, presidential physician to George Washington	
George Birkbeck	MD 1799	English physician and founder of Birkbeck, University of London	
John Carson (physician)	1776	Original Trustee, University of Pennsylvania and original incorporator and Fellow of The College of Physicians of Philadelphia	
Dugald Christie	MB 1882, CM 1882	Founder of Mukden Medical College in China, now known as the China Medical University	
Godfrey Howitt	MD 1830	Co-founder of the University of Melbourne Medical School	
Andrew Fernando Holmes	MD 1819	Co-founder and dean of the McGill University Faculty of Medicine	
Francis Richard Fraser	MB 1910, ChB 1910, MD 1922	Founder and first director of the Royal Postgraduate Medical School, now part of the Imperial College School of Medicine, vice-chancellor of the University of London	
Sophia Jex-Blake	1873	Founder of the London School of Medicine for Women (now UCL Medical School) and the Edinburgh School of Medicine for Women	
John Morgan	MD 1763	Founder of the University of Pennsylvania Medical School, founder of the American Philosophical Society, served as Chief Physician and Director General of the Continental Army	
Charles Nicholson	MD 1833	co-founder and chancellor of the University of Sydney, co-founder of the University of Sydney Faculty of Medicine	
Benjamin Rush	MD 1768	Founding Father of the United States, Surgeon General of the Continental Army, founder of Dickinson College	
Nathan Smith	1797	New England physician, founder of the Yale School of Medicine, Dartmouth Medical School, University of Vermont College of Medicine and the medical school at Bowdoin College	
John Stephenson	MD 1820	Co-founder of the McGill University Faculty of Medicine	
Thomas Peter Anderson Stuart	MB 1880, CM 1880, MD 1882	Co-founder of the University of Sydney Faculty of Medicine	
Colin S. Valentine	LLD 1876	Medical missionary, founded coeducational Agra Medical Training Institution	,
Benjamin Waterhouse	1778	Co-founder of Harvard Medical School	

== Leaders in medicine ==
Name	Class year	Notability	Reference(s)
John Abercrombie	MD 1803	Wrote Pathological and Practical Researches on Diseases of the Brain and Spinal Cord, the first textbook on neuropathology, known for Abercrombie's degeneration, the deposition of amyloid between cells	
William Alison	MD 1811, Prof. Medicine and Physic 1822–56	Scottish physician, President of the Royal College of Physicians of Edinburgh, advocate of preventative social medicine	
Andrew Balfour	MB 1894, CM 1894, MD 1898, BSc 1900	Scottish physician, Medical Officer of Health in Khartoum, Director of the London School of Hygiene and Tropical Medicine	
Thomas Graham Balfour	MD 1834	Scottish physician, President of the Royal Statistical Society, Staff Surgeon at the Royal Military Asylum	
James Barry	1809	Irish surgeon and Inspector General of military hospitals, advocated for improved sanitation in British overseas territories and performed one of the first successful caesarean sections by a European doctor	
Joseph Bell	MD 1859	Scottish surgeon, lecturer at the University of Edinburgh Medical School and personal surgeon to Queen Victoria, served as the inspiration for Sherlock Holmes	
Seneka Bibile	PhD 1952	Founder of the Sri Lanka National Pharmaceuticals Policy	
Alexander Biggam	MB 1911, ChB 1911, MD 1942	Scottish physician, Major General in the British Army, Honorary physician to King George VI	
Sir Gilbert Blane	1773	Physician to the King (George IV and William IV) and the Prince of Wales, instituted health reform in the Royal Navy	
James Couper Brash	BSc 1908, MB 1910, ChB 1910, Chair of Anatomy 1931–54	British anatomist, President of the Anatomical Society of Great Britain and Ireland from 1945–1947	
Walter Channing	1811	American obstetrician, co-founder of Boston Lying-In Hospital, now Brigham and Women's Hospital, Professor of Obstetrics and Medical Jurisprudence at Harvard Medical School 1815–54	
Robert Christison	MD 1819, Prof. Medical Jurisprudence 1822–32, Prof. Materia Medica and Therapeutics 1832–77	Scottish physician, President of the Royal College of Physicians of Edinburgh, President of the Royal College of Surgeons of Edinburgh, President of the British Medical Association, Physician in Ordinary to the Queen in Scotland, expert in toxicology, key witness in the Burke and Hare trial	
John Conolly	MD 1821	English psychiatrist, co-founder of the British Medical Association	
James Craik	MD 1750	Physician General of the Continental Army, personal physician and close friend of George Washington	
Graham Creasey	BMSc 1970, MB 1972, ChB 1972, FRCSEd 1979, Residency in Neurosurgery 1972–1986	Scottish neurosurgeon, Professor of Spinal Cord Injury Medicine at Stanford University School of Medicine	
William Cullen	1736, Prof. Physiology 1756–89	President of the Royal College of Physicians and Surgeons of Glasgow (1746-7), President of the Royal College of Physicians of Edinburgh (1773–75), first physician to the King in Scotland	
Daniel John Cunningham	MD 1876, Prof. Anatomy 1903–1909	Scottish physician and anatomist, author of Cunningham's Textbook of Anatomy and Cunningham's Manual of Practical Anatomy	
Stanley Davidson	MB 1919, ChB 1919, Chair of Medicine 1938–59	British physician, author of Davidson's Principles and Practice of Medicine, the first medical textbook to sell over a million copies	
Andrew Duncan Jr.	MA 1793, MD 1794, Prof. Med Jurisprudence 1807–32	Creator of the journal Edinburgh New Dispensatory, Chief Editor of the Edinburgh Medical and Surgical Journal	
Andrew Duncan Sr.	1768, Prof. Medicine 1773–1824	President of the Royal Medical Society and the Royal College of Physicians of Edinburgh, first physician to the King in Scotland, founder of the Harveian Society, founder of the first lunatic asylum in Edinburgh	
Emmanuel Evans-Anfom	MBChB 1947, DTM&H 1950	Ghanaian physician, university administrator and public servant; Vice Chancellor of the Kwame Nkrumah University of Science and Technology (1967−1973)	
Joseph Fayrer	MD 1859	English physician, physician to King Edward VII, expert on snake venom	
Wong Fun	MD 1855, PhD 1857	First Chinese student to study medicine in the west, Deputy-Chief of Boji Hospital	
William Tennant Gairdner	MD 1845	President of the British Medical Association	
Kate Granger	MBChB 2005	Founded the #HelloMyNameIs campaign	
John C. Boileau Grant	MB 1908, ChB 1908	Anatomist, author of Grant's Atlas of Anatomy	
James Gregory	MD 1774	President of the Royal College of Physicians of Edinburgh, and author	
Charles Hastings	MD 1818	English physician, co-founder of the British Medical Association	
Gertrude Herzfeld	MD 1914	First practising women surgeon in Scotland, chair of the British Medical Association	
Francis Home	MD 1750, Prof. Materia Medica 1768–98	President of the Royal College of Physicians of Edinburgh, co-founder of the Royal Medical Society, made the first attempt to vaccinate against measles	
Sir Robert Hutchison, 1st Baronet	MB 1893, CM 1893, MD 1896	Scottish physician, author of Hutchison's Clinical Methods	
Charles Illingworth	MB 1922, ChB 1922, MD 1929, ChM 1939	President of the Royal College of Physicians and Surgeons of Glasgow, Surgeon to the Queen in Scotland	
Obadiah Johnson	MB 1886, CM 1886, MD 1889	Nigerian physician, second Nigerian to qualify as a doctor, author of A History of the Yorubas from the Earliest Times to the Beginning of the British Protectorate	
Adam Kuhn	MD 1768	Co-founder and President of the College of Physicians of Philadelphia, founding Professor of Materia Medica at the University of Pennsylvania School of Medicine	
John Coakley Lettsom	1768	Philanthropist, founder of the Medical Society of London	
Barry Kay	MBBS 1963	Immunologist and president of the European Academy of Allergy and Clinical Immunology	
Lim Boon Keng	MB 1892, CM 1892	Singaporean physician, co-founder of the Singapore Chinese Girls' School, recipient of the Order of the British Empire as an officer, President of Xiamen University	
Robert Lim	MB 1919, ChB 1919, PhD 1920, DSc 1924	Singaporean physician, Lieutenant General and Surgeon General of the Army of the Republic of China	
David Maclagan	MD 1805	Physician to the Forces, President of the Royal College of Surgeons of Edinburgh and Royal College of Physicians of Edinburgh	
Douglas Maclagan	MD 1833, Prof. Forensic Medicine 1864–1885	Scottish physician, President of the Royal College of Physicians of Edinburgh, President of the Royal College of Surgeons of Edinburgh, President of the Royal Medical Society and the President of the Royal Society of Edinburgh	
John George Macleod	MB 1938, ChB 1938	Scottish physician, author of Macleod's Clinical Examination	
Normand MacLaurin	MD 1854	Vice-President of the Executive council of the Legislative Council of New South Wales, Chancellor of the University of Sydney	
Samuel Manuwa	BSc 1926	Nigerian surgeon, Inspector General of Medical Services and former Chief Medical Adviser to the Federal Government of Nigeria	
Barbara Mawer	BSc 1957, PhD 1961	Biochemist and medical researcher, regarded as a "highly influential figure in the calcium homoeostasis field"	
Sir James McGrigor, 1st Baronet	1788	Founder of the Royal Army Medical Corps	
Claire McLintock	MBChB 1989	President of the International Society on Thrombosis and Haemostasis (2018–2020), President of the Society of Obstetric Medicine of Australia and New Zealand (2007–2009), President of the Thrombosis and Haemostasis Society of Australia and New Zealand (2009-2011), Officer of the New Zealand Order of Merit in 2019 "for services to haematology and obstetrics"	
B. K. Misra	PDC 1984-'87	Indian neurosurgeon, Vice-President of the World Federation of Neurosurgical Societies, former President of the Asian Australasian Society of Neurological Surgeons, and the Neurological Society of India. Recipient of Dr. B. C. Roy Award, the highest medical honour in India	
Frederick Montizambert	MD 1865	Canadian physician, first Director-General of Public Health in Canada, President of the Canadian Medical Association, President of the American Public Health Association, inductee to the Canadian Medical Hall of Fame	
Robert Muir	MA 1884, MB 1888, CM 1888, MD 1890	Scottish pathologist, author of Muir's Textbook of Pathology	
George Newman	MD 1895	English physician, Chief Medical Officer of England	
Thomas Bevill Peacock	MD 1842	English cardiologist, founder of the London Chest Hospital and expert on valvular heart disease	
Philip Raffaelli	MB 1979, ChB 1979	Surgeon General of the British Armed Forces, Vice Admiral in the Royal Navy, Governor of the University Hospitals Birmingham NHS Foundation Trust	
Mabel L. Ramsay	1904, 1905	First woman president of the Plymouth Medical Society, third woman elected a fellow of the Royal College of Surgeons	
Hugh Robson	MB 1941, ChB 1941	Principal and Vice-Chancellor of the University of Edinburgh and Vice-Chancellor of the University of Sheffield	
Sydney Selwyn	BSc, MB, ChB, MD	Authority on the history of medicine, designed the Florence Nightingale 10 pound note, pioneer in bone marrow transplantation	
Sheila Sherlock	MB 1941, ChB 1941, MD 1945	First woman in the UK to be appointed professor of medicine, published over 600 papers, founded the liver unit at London's Royal Free Hospital	
William Shippen Jr.	MD 1761	Surgeon General of the Continental Army, co-founder and president of the College of Physicians of Philadelphia	
Austin Smith	PhD 1986, MRC Prof. of Stem Cell Research 2003–06	Co-recipient of the Louis-Jeantet Prize for Medicine, Director of the Wellcome Trust/MRC Cambridge Stem Cell Institute	
John Smith	MD 1847	Founder of the Edinburgh school of dentistry, President of the Royal College of Surgeons of Edinburgh, President of the British Dental Association, co-founder of the Royal Hospital for Sick Children	
Sydney Smith	MB 1912, ChB 1912, MD 1914, Regius Chair of Forensic Medicine 1928–53, Dean of the Faculty of Medicine 1931–53, Rector of the University of Edinburgh 1954–57	Scottish forensic pathologist, published the textbook Textbook of Forensic Medicine in 1925	
Thomas Stewart Traill	MD 1802, Prof. Med Jurisprudence 1833–1862	Founder of the Royal Institution of Liverpool and the Liverpool Mechanics' Institution	
Ekkehard von Kuenssberg	MB 1939, ChB 1939	founder and President of the Royal College of General Practitioners	
Alexander Burns Wallace	MB 1922, ChB 1922, Reader 1946–1970	Scottish plastic surgeon, co-founder and president of the British Association of Plastic Surgeons and founding editor of the British Journal of Plastic Surgery, developed the Wallace rule of nines, a guide to estimate the proportion of body affected by burns	
Joanna Wardlaw	BSc 1979, MB ChB 1982, MD 1994, Professor of Applied Neuroimaging 2002–present	Internationally recognised expert in neuroimaging	
Robert Whytt	1734	President of the Royal College of Physicians of Edinburgh, first physician to the King in Scotland, wrote book on diseases of the nervous system	
David Wilkie	MB 1904, ChB 1904, MD 1909, ChM 1909, Prof. Systematic Surgery 1924–38	Scottish surgeon, regarded as the "father of British academic surgery"	
Caspar Wistar	MD 1786	American physician and anatomist, described the posterior part of the ethmoid bone, President of the American Philosophical Society and Society for the Abolition of Slavery	
Asrat Woldeyes	MD 1959	Ethiopian surgeon, physician, university dean, and political party leader	

== Pioneers in science and humanities ==
Name	Class year	Notability	Reference(s)
John Anderson	MD 1862	Scottish zoologist, first curator of the Indian Museum in Calcutta	
Joseph Black	MD 1754	Scottish physician and chemist, discoverer of carbon dioxide, latent heat and specific heat	
James Braid	1814	Scottish surgeon, pioneer of hypnotism and hypnotherapy	
Alexander Crum Brown	MA 1858, MD 1861, Prof. Chemistry 1869–1908	Scottish physician and chemist, discovered the double bond of ethylene, introduced the name kerogen for insoluble organic matter in oil shale	
Robert Brown	1793	Scottish botanist, named and described the cell nucleus and cytoplasmic streaming, discovered Brownian motion, discovered the difference between gymnosperms and angiosperms	
Thomas Brown	MD 1803	Scottish metaphysician	
Charles Darwin	1827	English naturalist, published the theory of evolution, author of On the Origin of Species and The Descent of Man	
Erasmus Darwin	1755	Physician, poet, author and evolutionary biologist	
Robert Edmond Grant	MD 1814	Scottish physician, biologist, mentor of Charles Darwin	
William Gregory	MD 1828, Chair of Chemistry 1844–1858	Scottish chemist, introduced "muriate of morphia" and "Gregory's salt" a mixture of morphine and codeine	
André Hellegers	MD 1951	Founder and director of the Kennedy Institute of Ethics	
Thomas Charles Hope	MD 1787, Prof. Medicine and Chemistry 1799–1843	Scottish physician, chemist, discovered the element strontium, demonstrated that water reached its maximum density at 4C in "Hope's experiment", President of the Royal College of Physicians of Edinburgh	
James Hutton	1747	Scottish physician and geologist, known for theories on deep time and the Gaia hypothesis	
John Kirk	MD 1854	Scottish physician, botanist, companion of David Livingstone, identified the Zanzibar red colobus, British Consul in Zanzibar	
Neil Gordon Munro	MB 1888, CM 1888, MD 1909	Scottish physician and anthropologist, one of the first people to study the Ainu people of Hokkaido	
Richard Owen	1825	English biologist, coined the word "Dinosauria", opponent of the theory of evolution	
William Prout	MD 1811	English physician and chemist, known for Prout's hypothesis, discovered hydrochloric acid in the stomach and improved the barometer	
David Boswell Reid	MD 1830	Scottish physician and inventor, expert on ventilation, President of the Royal Medical Society	
Daniel Rutherford	MD 1772, Prof. Medicine and Botany 1786–1819	Scottish physician, chemist and botanist, first to isolate nitrogen in 1772	
Charles Wyville Thomson	MD 1845	Chief scientist of the Challenger expedition, discovered animal life at depths of 1200m	
Edward Turner	MD 1819, Lecturer in Chemistry 1823–27	Scottish chemist, first Professor of Chemistry at University College London	
Thomas Young	1794–95	English polymath and optical physicists, performed Young's interference experiment and contributed in the fields of optics and solid mechanics	

== Non-medical accomplishments ==
Name	Class year	Notability	Reference(s)
William Johnston Almon	1836	Nova Scotian physician, Canadian Senator from Nova Scotia, Canadian MP for Halifax	
William Babtie	LRCP (Edin) 1880, LRCS (Edin) 1880	Scottish surgeon, recipient of the Victoria Cross, Lieutenant General in the British Army	
Hastings Banda	MB 1941, ChB 1941	Malawian politician, 1st President of Malawi from 1966 to 1994	
Gustavus Richard Brown	MD 1768	United States Representative from Maryland, physician at George Washington's deathbed.	
William Buchan	MD 1761	Author of the book Domestic Medicine	
Logan Campbell	MD 1839	New Zealand physician, Mayor of Auckland, co-founder of Auckland Savings Bank, Superintendent of Auckland, known as the "Father of Auckland"	
William Crawford	MD 1781	United States Representative from Pennsylvania's 5th and 6th Congressional districts	
John Crawfurd	MD 1803	Scottish physician, Governor of Singapore	
James C. Crow	MD 1822	Scottish inventor of the sour mash process for creating Bourbon whiskey, creator of the Old Crow brand of Bourbon whiskey	
Campbell Mellis Douglas	MD 1861	Canadian army surgeon, recipient of the Victoria Cross	
Henry Edward Manning Douglas	LRCP (Edin) 1898, LRCS (Edin) 1898	Scottish surgeon, recipient of the Victoria Cross, Major General in the British Army	
Arthur Ignatius Conan Doyle	MB 1881, CM 1881, MD 1885	Novelist, creator of the character Sherlock Holmes	
Bernard Friedman	MB 1921, ChB 1921	South African surgeon, co-founder of the anti-apartheid Progressive Party	
Oliver Goldsmith	1754	Anglo-Irish novelist, playwright, author of the novel The Vicar of Wakefield and the children's tale The History of Little Goody Two-Shoes	
James Graham	MA 1879, MB 1882, CM 1882, MD 1888	Australian physician, 38th Mayor of Sydney	
William Jardine	MD 1802	Co-founder of Hong Kong conglomerate Jardine, Matheson and Company, Whig MP for Ashburton	
Henry Halcro Johnston	MB 1880, CM 1880, MD 1893, BSc 1893, DSc 1894	Scottish botanist, represented Scotland internationally in rugby union, Colonel in the British Army	
James Jones	MD 1796	United States Representative from Virginia	
Kerry Lang	MB 1998, ChB 1998	British triathlete, British Triathlon Vice Champion of the Year 2009	
Henry Latimer	MD 1775	United States Senator from Delaware	
Lim Chong Eu	MB 1944, ChB 1944	Malaysian politician, served as Chief Minister of Penang for a record 21 years, co-founder and president of Parti Gerakan Rakyat Malaysia	
George Logan	MD 1779	United States Senator from Pennsylvania	
Robert McIntyre	MB 1938, ChB 1938	Scottish politician, leader of the Scottish National Party from 1947 to 1956, first SNP MP for Motherwell	
Valentine Munbee McMaster	MD 1853	British army surgeon, recipient of the Victoria Cross	
Samuel L. Mitchill	MD 1786	United States Senator from New York	
David Monro	MD 1835	Speaker of the New Zealand House of Representatives, MP representing Waimea	
George Ernest Morrison	MD 1895	Australian adventurer, The Times correspondent in Peking during the Boxer Rebellion	
John Moultrie	MD 1749	American politician, acting governor of East Florida	
Mungo Park	1791	Scottish explorer, first westerner to have travelled to the Niger River	
John Rae	MD 1833	Scottish explorer, discovered the fate of the Franklin Expedition, discovered Rae Straight, showed that King William Land was an island	
Peter Mark Roget	MD 1798	British physician and author, published Roget's Thesaurus	
Samuel Seabury	1753	First American Episcopal bishop, first bishop of Connecticut	
Bhagvat Singh	MB 1895, CM 1895	Indian prince, Maharaja of the princely state of Gondal	
Samuel Smiles	MD 1832	Scottish author and biographer, wrote the book Self-Help	
William Henry Thomas Sylvester	LRCS (Edin) 1853	British army surgeon, recipient of the Victoria Cross	
Robert Stirton Thornton	MB 1884, CM 1884	Minister of Education for Manitoba, President of the Medical Council of Canada	
Alec Boswell Timms	LRCP (Edin) 1903, LRCS (Edin) 1903	Scottish-Australian rugby union forward, played for Scotland and participated in the 1899 British Lions tour to Australia	
Thomas Tudor Tucker	MD 1770	United States Representative from South Carolina, longest serving Treasurer of the United States, presidential physician to James Madison	
John Batty Tuke	MB 1881, CM 1881, MD 1890	Scottish psychiatrist, Conservative MP for the University of Edinburgh and St Andrews	
Sir Charles Tupper	MD 1843	6th Prime Minister of Canada and father of confederation	

== Faculty (who were not also graduates of the medical school) ==
Name	Department	Notability	Reference
George Barger	Prof. Chemistry in Relation to Medicine 1919–37	British chemist, identified tyramine, contributed to the synthesis of thyroxine and Vitamin B1	
Clare Blackburn	Chair of Tissue Stem Cell Biology 2011-present	British embryologist, first to grow a whole organ, a thymus, inside an animal	
John Crofton	Prof. Respiratory Disease and Tuberculosis 1952–77, Dean of Medicine 1964–66, Vice Principal of the University 1969–70	British physician, pioneered the treatment of tuberculosis, known as the Edinburgh method	
William Cullen	Prof. of Chemistry and Medicine 1755–66, Prof. of Institutes of Medicine 1766–73, Prof. of Medicine 1773–90	Scottish physician, first demonstrated artificial refrigeration	
Vincent du Vigneaud	National Research Council Fellow 1928–29	American biochemist, discovered oxytocin, awarded the 1955 Nobel Prize in Chemistry	
Charles ffrench-Constant	Professor of Medical Neurology 2007-present	British neurologist, first to identify adult glial precursor cells	
John Gaddum	Chair of Materia Medica 1942–58	British pharmacologist, discovered Substance P, a neuropeptide	
Varsha Jain	Research	"Space gynaecologist"	
Robert Evan Kendell	Chair of Psychiatry 1973–90, Dean of the College of Medicine and Veterinary Medicine 1990–94	Welsh psychiatrist, Chief Medical Officer of Scotland 1991–96	
James Learmonth	Chair of Surgery 1939–56	Scottish surgeon, performed lumbar sympathectomy on King George VI to treat his vascular disease	
Joseph Lister	Prof. Clinical Surgery 1869–77, FRCS (Edin) 1855	Scottish surgeon, introduced carbolic acid to sterilize surgical instruments	
Barrie Marmion	Robert Irvine Chair of Bacteriology 1968–79	English microbiologist, developed the first vaccine against Q fever	
Edvard Moser	Post-doctoral researcher 1995–97, Honorary Professor	Norwegian neuroscientist, discovered entorhinal grid cells, awarded the 2014 Nobel Prize in Physiology or Medicine	
May-Britt Moser	Post-doctoral researcher 1995–97	Norwegian neuroscientist, discovered entorhinal grid cells, awarded the 2014 Nobel Prize in Physiology or Medicine	
John Savill	Prof. Medicine 1998-present, Dean of the College of Medicine and Veterinary Medicine 2002-present	Scottish physician, CEO of the Medical Research Council 2010-present	
Edward Albert Sharpey-Schafer	Chair of Physiology 1883–1933	English physiologist, regarded as the founder of endocrinology, discovered adrenaline, coined the terms endocrine and insulin	
Robert Sibbald	Prof. of Medicine 1685–1722	Scottish physician, first described the blue whale, founder of the Royal College of Physicians of Edinburgh	
Edwin Southern	Post-doctoral researcher MRC Mammalian Genome Unit 1967–85	Developed the Southern blot, founder of Oxford Gene Technology, received the 2005 Lasker Award for Clinical Medical Research	
James Syme	Prof. Clinical Surgery 1833–48, FRCS (Edin) 1823	Scottish surgeon, his chemical experiments led to invention of the Mackintosh raincoat, conducted the first exarticulation of the hip, known for Syme's amputation	
Michael Woodruff	Chair of Surgical Science 1957–76	British transplant surgeon, performed the first ever kidney transplant in the UK at the Edinburgh Royal Infirmary in 1960	
Andrew H. Wyllie	Prof. Experimental Pathology 1992–98, FRS 1995	Scottish pathologist, discovered the importance of programmed cell death, coined the term "apoptosis"	

== See also ==
- List of Nobel laureates affiliated with the University of Edinburgh
