= Bessie Pullen-Burry =

British novelist, explorer, and suffragist

- Born: 1858; Sompting, England
- Died: 21 September 1937 (aged 78–79); Hindhead, England

Bessie Pullen-Burry (1858 – 21 September 1937) was a British novelist, geographer, explorer, suffragist, and anti-Semite.

Bessie Pullen-Burry was born in 1858 in Sompting, Sussex, England, the daughter of John Pullen Burry, a market gardener. Her brother was the occultist Henry B. Pullen Burry.

After publishing three novels, Pullen-Burry turned to travel writing. Her well-received travel narratives and her numerous papers delivered before learned societies brought her respect as a geographer. In 1903, she became a fellow of the Royal Anthropological Institute. In 1912, Pullen-Burry founded the Geographical Circle of the Lyceum Club, to promote female geographers at a time when women were excluded from the Royal Geographical Society. Shortly thereafter, the RGS allowed female members and Pullen-Burry was inducted as a fellow of the RGS in 1913.

Pullen-Burry was an ardent suffragist and women's suffrage is a significant theme in her travel books.

Pullen-Burry was an early member of The Britons, an anti-Semitic and anti-immigration organisation. Their imprint Judaic Publishing Company published her Letters from Palestine (1922).

Pullen-Burry died on 21 September 1937 in Hindhead, England.

== Bibliography ==
- Nobly Won: A Novel. 2 vol. London: Remington, 1888.
- Eleanor Lewknor. 2 vol. London: Remington, 1889.
- Blotted Out. 1 vol. London: Roxburghe Press, 1897.
- Jamaica as It Is. London: T. Fisher Unwin, 1903.
- Ethiopia in Exile: Jamaica Revisited. London: T. Fisher Unwin, 1905.
- In a German Colony; or, Four Weeks in New Britain. London: Methuen. 1909.
- From Halifax to Vancouver . London: Mills & Boon, 1912.
- Letters from Palestine, February–April, 1922. Judaic Publishing Company, 1922.
