= Julia Lawton =

British medical sociologist

Julia Lawton is a British health services researcher. She is the current Professor of Health and Social Science at the University of Edinburgh Medical School's Usher Institute and a member of the Chief Scientist Office's Health Improvement Committee.

== Research ==
Having studied Social Anthropology at the University of Cambridge's Department of Social Anthropology, Lawton specialises in qualitative research in the fields of medical sociology and the sociology of health and illness. Lawton has contributed significantly to the understanding of a number of health related fields including medication adherence, diabetes, obesity and sexual and reproductive health. For a number of years she served as a lead editor on the journal Sociology of Health and Illness and has authored over 80 publications in books and peer-reviewed journals.

== Key publications ==
Lawton's first book, titled The Dying Process: Patient Experiences of Palliative Care took an ethnographic look at dying within a hospice setting in modern-day Britain. The book has been described as 'lifting the lid' on the challenging ethical practices of palliative care and despite proving controversial at the time of release remains a definitive text in this field.

Lawton has conducted a considerable amount of research into the lived illness experiences and management of health conditions, including much research in the field of diabetes. Within this field Lawton has contributed to our understanding of the barriers to effective diabetes (self-)management and the benefits of tailored health education programmes.

== See also ==
- University of Edinburgh Medical School
- List of University of Edinburgh medical people
- List of University of Edinburgh people
