= Gisela C. Lebzelter =

Gisela C. Lebzelter is an author, historian, and scholar, and an expert on British fascism and antisemitism. Scholars who study British fascism and antisemitism frequently cite her 1978 book Political Anti-Semitism in England 1918-1939—a revision of her thesis submitted to St Antony's College, Oxford.

Lebzelter has done much research on The Britons (responsible for repeatedly publishing The Protocols of the Elders of Zion in the UK), including its founding President, Henry Hamilton Beamish, and his successor, John Henry Clarke.

Dr. Lebzelter has a non-Jewish background. She was a student at the Free University of Berlin and University College London.

== Works ==
- Political Anti-Semitism in England, 1918-1939

(Thesis [D.Phil.]--University of Oxford, 1977)
Description: 5, ii, 349 leaves: ill.; 30 cm.
BLDSC reference no.: D37413/87.

- Ibid.

(New York: Holmes & Meier Publishers, Inc., 1978)
ISBN 978-0-8419-0426-2

- Ibid.

(London: Macmillan, in association with St Antony’s College, Oxford, 1978) :ISBN 978-0-333-24251-3
