= Judaic Publishing Co. =

Judaic Publishing Co. was an antisemitic publishing entity controlled by Henry Hamilton Beamish, an Irish-born journalist and founder of The Britons. In 1920 Beamish took over the publication of The Jewish Peril from Eyre & Spottiswoode, and published it under the imprint of The Britons. Subsequently, this entity was effectively merged by Beamish and his associates into the Britons Publishing Company, which continued disseminating antisemitic propaganda. The British Library has three imprints by this entity (listed below).

== Works ==
- The Jews’ Who’s Who. Israelite finance: its sinister influence, Judaic Publishing Co., London, 1920. pp. 255.
- The Jews’ who’s who. Israelite finance: its sinister influence ..., Popular edition by Henry Hamilton Beamish, London: Judaic Publishing Co., 1921. pp. 255. 18 cm.
- Letters from Palestine, February–April, 1922, Bessie Pullen Burry, Judaic Publishing Co. London, [1922]. pp. 137.
