= Britons Publishing Society =

English antisemitic publisher

Britons Publishing Society, founded in 1923, was an offshoot of The Britons. According to scholar Gisela C. Lebzelter, The Britons split because:

... internal disagreements proved paralysing. Seven members were excluded in November 1923, and three executives members, J. H. Clarke, the famous British homeopath, R. T. Cooper and W. A. Peters, seceded to establish 'The Britons Publishing Society'.

On 15 December 1923 the three executed a memorandum in which they expressed their organisational purpose as follows:

"propagating views in regard to the Jews, the Christian Religion, the Government of the British Isles and the British Empire, and other matters which, in our opinion from time to time, it is in the interests of the British Public should be expressed and distributed and to do anything at all which, in our opinion, equips us for this purpose.

The Society to be conducted not for the purpose of making profit"

== Publications ==
- British Library

   Title: Protocols of the Meetings of the Learned Elders of Zion / translated from the Russian Text by Victor E. Marsden.
   Contributor: Nilus.
   Publication Details: London : The Britons Publishing Society, [between 1937 and 1971].
   Language: English
   Uniform Title: Protocols of the wise men of Zion.
   Identifier: System number 009601120
   Physical Description: 65 p.; 21 cm.
   Shelfmark(s): Document Supply W73/5522
   UIN: BLL01009601120

- Apionus, pseud.

The bolshevists of ancient history ...
(London: The Britons publishing society, 1924)

- Anonymous

Related names: Sergi︠e︡ǐ Aleksandrovich Nilus, 1862-1929, Victor E. Marsden (Victor Emile), 1866-1920

Protocols of the Meetings of the Learned Elders of Zion
(London: The Britons Publishing Society, 1931)

- Anonymous

Protocols of the Meetings of the Learned Elders of Zion
Translated from the Russian text by Victor E. Marsden
(London: Britons publishing society, 1933)
Related Names: Sergi︠e︡ǐ Aleksandrovich Nilus, 1862-1929, Victor E. Marsden (Victor Emile), 1866-1920

- George F. Dillon

'Grand Orient Freemasonry unmasked: as the Secret Powers Behind communism through Discovery of Lost Lectures,
Delivered at Edinburgh in October 1884
With preface by Dennis Fahey
(London: Britons Publishing Society, c1950; [New and rev. ed.])

== See also ==
- The Britons
- John Henry Clarke
- Protocols of the Elders of Zion
