= Alexander Peter Buchan =

English physician

- Born: 1761; Ackworth, England
- Died: 5 December 1824 (aged 62–63)
- Occupation: Physician

Alexander Peter Buchan (1761 – 5 December 1824) was an English medical doctor.

== Biography ==
Buchan was born at Ackworth, near Pontefract, in 1764, being the son of Dr. William Buchan, author of ‘Domestic, Medicine’. He was educated at the high school and university of Edinburgh, studied anatomy and medicine also in London under the Hunters and Dr. George Fordyce, and proceeded to Leyden, where he graduated M.D. on 11 July 1793. Settling in London, he became physician to the Westminster Hospital in 1813, but resigned that office in 1818. He was re-elected in 1820, and died on 5 December 1824.

Buchan's works include ‘Enchiridion Syphiliticum,’ 1797; ‘Treatise on Sea Bathing, with Remarks on the Use of the Warm Bath,’ 1801; ‘Bionomia, or Opinions concerning Life and Health,’ 1811; ‘Symptomatology,’ 1824; besides a translation o Daubenton's ‘Observations on Indigestion,’ 1807; an edition of Dr. Armstrong's ‘Diseases of Children,’ 1808; and the twenty-first edition of his father's ‘Domestic Medicine,’ 1813.
