= John Henry Clarke =

English homeopath

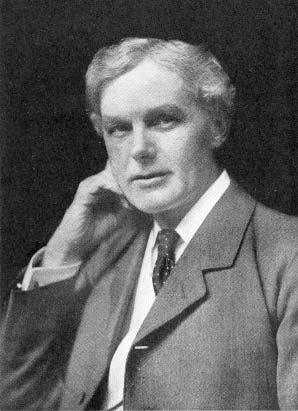
- John Henry Clarke
- Born: 1853; England
- Died: 24 November 1931 (aged 77–78)
- Scientific career
- Fields: Homeopathy

John Henry Clarke (1853 – 24 November 1931) was an English classical homeopath, and one of the highest-profile antisemites of his era in Great Britain. He helped found and led The Britons, an antisemitic organisation, from 1919 until his death in 1931. Educated at the University of Edinburgh, he received his medical degree in 1877.

== Homeopathy ==
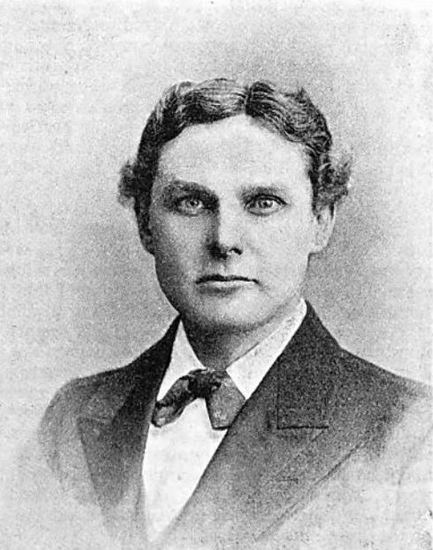
c. 1895

As a physician Clarke had a clinic in Piccadilly, London, which was quite successful, and had many private clients. He also was "chief consulting physician" at the London Homeopathic Hospital. Clarke was a longtime editor of The Homeopathic World, and wrote a number of books on the practice, including The Prescriber: A Dictionary of the New Therapeutics, a standard book in the field.

== Politics ==
Clarke was a leading advocate of antisemitism. He was the chair at the meeting where The Britons was founded, as an associate of Henry Hamilton Beamish, and was vice-president and chairman until his death. He wrote several articles on Christianity that have a militant bent. When Beamish became a fugitive and fled England, Clarke became the head of The Britons, and formed with two others a splinter organization, the Britons Publishing Society.

== Anti-vivisection ==
Clarke was an opponent of vivisection and was on the executive committee of the Victoria Street Society for the Protection of Animals from Vivisection. He described carbolic acid and the antiseptic system as "fruits of vivisection". He aimed to discredit antiseptic and medical research that required animal models.

Clarke criticized the germ theory of disease and experiments of Louis Pasteur. He authored The Germ Theory and the Public, published by the Victoria Street Society in 1892.

== Works ==
For many years, he was the editor of The Homeopathic World. He wrote many books, his best known were Dictionary of Practical Materia Medica and Repertory of Materia Medica (i.e., the Clinical Repertory), both of which are recommended by the U.S. Food and Drug Administration's rules on "Conditions under Which Homeopathic Drugs May be Marketed".

=== Homeopathy ===
- A Dictionary of Domestic Medicine and Homeopathic Treatment
- Catarrh, Colds and Grippe
- Cholera, Diarrhea and Dysentery
- Clinical Repertory
- Clinical Repertory (Indian edition)
- Constitutional Medicine
- Dictionary of Practical Materia Medica, 3 volumes (British edition)
- Dictionary of Practical Materia Medica, 3 volumes (Indian edition)
- Diseases of Heart and Arteries
- Grand Characteristics of Materia Medica
- Gunpowder As A War Remedy
- Hahnemann and Paracelsus
- Homeopathy Explained
- Indigestion-Its Causes and Cure
- Non-Surgical Treatment of Diseases of Glands and Bones
- Prescriber
- Prescriber (Indian edition)
- Radium As An Internal Remedy
- The Revolution in Medicine
- The Therapeutics of Cancer
- Therapeutics of the Serpent Poisons
- Tumours
- Un Diccionario De Materia Médica Practica (3 volumes)
- Whooping Cough

=== Antisemitic ===
- White Labour Versus Red
- Call of the Sword (London: Financial News, 1917)
- England Under the Heel of the Jew (London: C. F. Roworth, 1918)

=== Anti-vivisection ===
- The Pasteur Craze (1886)
- Vivisection: A Question of the Day (1887)
- M. Pasteur at Bay: Failure of the Experiment (1890)

== See also ==
- Domestic medicine
- On Homeopathy
  - List of homeopaths
- On Anti-Semitism
  - The Britons
  - Henry Hamilton Beamish
  - Protocols of the Elders of Zion
