= Henry B. Pullen Burry =

Henry Burry Pullen-Burry (born Henry Burry Pullen; 18 December 1854 – 30 December 1926) was a British medical doctor best known as an occultist and author of the book Qabalism. He belonged to the famed occult group The Hermetic Order of the Golden Dawn, founded in London in 1888. The order taught and practised ceremonial magic, Qabalism, Rosicrucianism, and psychic arts such as astral projection, divination, astrology, etc.

== Early life ==
Pullen-Burry was born on 18 December 1854, at the Rectory, Sompting, Sussex, to John Pullen and his wife Emily, née Heather. In 1868, his father John formally changed the family surname to Pullen-Burry - John's mother was born Ann Burry. Henry was educated at Craufurd College in Maidenhead and entered the University of London in June 1873. He did further training at the Royal College of Physicians in London.

He was married to Rose Anwyl, with whom he had a son given the same name (born 1882) and two daughters, Ethel and Winifred.

== Occult activity ==
On 27 November 1892, he joined the Isis-Urania Temple, which was the first founded Golden Dawn temple (in 1888). Other temples were established elsewhere later. Each Golden Dawn member was required to choose a magical motto. Pullen Burry chose Anima Pura Sit ("Let the Soul Be Pure"). His wife Rose joined the order in 1894. Her motto was Urge semper igitur ("Always press forward"?).

One of the most active members in London, he rose rapidly in the Isis-Urania Temple governing hierarchy, becoming its Sub-Cancellarius official in July 1894, promoted to cancellarius November 1896. Cancellarius (Latin for "chancellor") of a Golden Dawn temple was its chief keeper of records and was one of the top three presiding officials in authority over a temple. During the late 1890s internal revolt against top leader and co-founder of the G.D. Order, Samuel Liddell MacGregor Mathers, Pullen Burry remained in the camp that stayed loyal to Mathers.

Pullen-Burry unexpectedly abandoned family, his Golden Dawn temple, and home country to emigrate to the US, initially drawn by the lure of gold during the Klondike Gold Rush. The Klondike began as a widespread rush in 1897, peaking in 1898 as far as drawing the largest numbers (in the tens of thousands) of would-be-wealthy gold miners, the vast majority of whom ended up disappointed, and poorer for their adventure. The best mining claims had already been staked very early on, mostly by locals already up there, and not by the hordes of hopefuls who came later. Without having evidence to the contrary, it is probably a safe bet to think Pullen Burry did not succeed as a gold prospector. One could speculate his medical skills may have stood him in good stead, though, and perhaps he made a decent living treating medical complaints of the masses of prospectors drawn North. Annie Horniman, a prominent Golden Dawn member, also prominent in English theatre circles as founder/manager of theatre companies, came to the rescue of the Doctor's abandoned family, taking them under her wing financially, and paying for the education of the two daughters. Wife Rose later remarried.

Pullen Burry did not abandon occultism when he moved to America, however. He reportedly influenced the development of several temples in the US organised along Golden Dawn lines. He corresponded for many years with American Paul Foster Case who had joined an American Golden Dawn temple affiliated with the British-based Order. Pullen Burry encouraged Case to found his own US-based, Golden Dawn-influenced occult organisation, which came to be known as The Builders of the Adytum. Case wrote well-known books on the Tarot, and Qabalah.

== Pullen-Burry and Sir Arthur Conan Doyle ==
Sir Arthur Conan Doyle described Pullen-Burry in an article "Early Psychic Experiences", published in Pearson's Magazine, March 1924. It's reproduced in part in occult historian Ellic Howe's book on The Golden Dawn. [Quote from Conan Doyle]:"There was a small doctor dwelling near me, small in stature, and also I fear, in practice. Pullen Bury [sic] was the name. He was a student of the occult, and my curiosity was aroused by learning that he had one room in his house which no one entered but himself, as it was reserved for mystic and philosophic purposes." Ellic Howe continues the story, "Pullen Burry suggested that Conan Doyle should join the G.D., but did not reveal its name. Conan Doyle described an unusual dream which he appeared to equate with an 'astral visit' made by some member of the order to discover whether or not he was a suitable candidate. He decided not to ask for admission." Another occult historian, R.A. Gilbert, mentions Conan Doyle's meetings with Pullen Burry occurred in 1898. Gilbert further quotes Conan Doyle as saying he in fact found his apparent astral examination "queer and disagreeable". A month or two later, Pullen Burry brought [fellow G.D. member] Dr. Felkin (see Robert Felkin) to see him. The [Conan Doyle] article records his two visitors' extraordinary conversation about an 'astral journey' they had made together to Central Africa." [Quote from Conan Doyle's article]: "To return to the little doctor, he went out to the Klondyke [sic] and I lost sight of him for a long time. From what I learnt, I should judge that the powers of this society included that of loosening their own etheric bodies [see: "etheric body"], in summoning the etheric bodies of others (mine for example), and in making thought images ... But their line of development or philosophy is beyond me. I was destined to meet Pullen Burry again, for when I was in America last year I found him full of Rosicrucian lore and occult knowledge."

If Conan Doyle had decided to join instead of reject the Golden Dawn, he would have joined the ranks of a number of famous folks who became members, including writers W. B. Yeats, Arthur Machen, Algernon Blackwood, Bram Stoker, and Evelyn Underhill, Irish revolutionary and feminist Maude Gonne, British stage actress Florence Farr, and Oscar Wilde's wife Constance Mary Wilde who joined in the first year, 1888.

== The writer ==
Pullen-Burry wrote at least two books that were published. One is a little-known book called Our Morning Bath, possibly on the topic of personal hygiene and health. The other is his much better known Qabalism, published by The Yogi Publication Society, Chicago, 1925. The Yogi Publication Society hardcover has been reprinted repeatedly through the decades. In his book Qabalism, Pullen-Burry challenges Qabalistic orthodoxy by putting forth his own theory that the Tree of Life, the central symbolic diagram of Qabalah mysticism, should have 34 paths linking its 10 Sephira (or Spheres), instead of 32 paths, as traditionally taught.

== Death ==
His death was reported as occurring on 30 December 1926 at the age of 72 years from toxemia, in Multnomah Hospital in Portland, Oregon.
