= Gordon Wishart =

Professor Gordon C Wishart
- Born: 3 September 1960 (age 65); Edinburgh, Scotland
- Education: University of Edinburgh
- Known for: Diagnosis and treatment of breast cancer, development of Predict cancer survival model, founder of Check4Cancer Ltd
- Scientific career
- Fields: Medicine, oncology, surgical oncology
- Workplaces: Royal College of Surgeons of Glasgow, Royal College of Surgeons of England, Addenbrooke’s Hospital, Cambridge, University of Cambridge, Anglia Ruskin School of Medicine

Professor Gordon C. Wishart FRCS (Eng.) FRCS (Gen.) (3 September 1960-) is the founder, Chief Medical Officer, and CEO of Check4Cancer, an early cancer detection and prevention organisation . In 2016, Check4Cancer launched rapid access, streamlined, and audited diagnostic pathways for breast and skin cancer for the insured and self-pay markets, leading to the award of “Diagnostic Provider of the Year” at the annual Health Investor Awards in 2018. In late 2017, Check4Cancer launched the first worldwide breast cancer risk test (MyBreastRisk) to combine genetic, family history, and lifestyle risk factors to underpin a risk-stratified breast screening programme.

As the former Director of the Cambridge Breast Unit from 2005-2010, and current Professor of Cancer Surgery at Anglia Ruskin School of Medicine since 2008, he has contributed to clinical research and modernisation of cancer diagnosis and treatment, with more than 100 peer-reviewed papers in scientific journals. In 2010, he led a team of clinicians and scientists that developed the PREDICT breast cancer treatment and survival model, which is now used worldwide.

== Early life and education ==
Gordon Cranston Wishart was born in Edinburgh, Scotland, on 3 September 1960.

He studied at the University of Edinburgh Medical School, where he received his MB ChB in July 1983. He subsequently obtained his MD from the University of Edinburgh in June 1992 with a thesis entitled Aspects of multidrug resistance in breast cancer.

== Research and publications ==
Wishart is notable for his prolific clinical research output, alongside his work as a practising breast and endocrine surgeon.

He has received the following prizes as recognition for his scientific contribution:

- Best paper: British Association of Day Surgery, 2002
- British Journal of Surgery Prize for best paper at British Association of Endocrine Surgeons, September 2006
- British Journal of Surgery Prize for best paper at British Association of Endocrine Surgeons, September 2007

As of October 2009, he is principal investigator on the following studies:

- Reasons for improved survival in screen-detected breast cancer
- Development of a UK version of Adjuvantonline.
- Infrared Imaging for breast cancer diagnosis
- BT blood test for breast cancer detection

In addition, he is a co-investigator, surgical coordinator, or clinical surgical coordinator on an additional 15 research studies.

His research has been published in The Lancet, the British Journal of Cancer, the British Medical Journal, the Journal of Clinical Oncology, and the British Journal of Surgery.

== Major achievements ==
- In 1990, Wishart identified that P-glycoprotein, a trans-membrane export pump involved in multidrug resistance, was present in breast cancer.
- In 1998, Wishart introduced early patient discharge, with wound drains still in situ, following breast cancer surgery. Although controversial at the time, this technique has since been widely adopted.
- Wishart pioneered minimally invasive parathyroid surgery as a daycase procedure in the UK, together with the use of intraoperative parathyroid hormone (PTH) measurement for parathyroid surgery.
- In 2007, Wishart piloted gold seed insertion following breast conserving surgery for breast cancer to facilitate targeted radiotherapy.
- In 2009, Wishart pioneered preoperative axillary lymph node staging in breast cancer treatment.

== Current posts ==
Gordon Wishart currently holds the following posts:

- Medical Director, BreastHealth UK
- Visiting Professor of Cancer Surgery, Anglia Ruskin University
- Associate Lecturer, Faculty of Clinical Medicine, University of Cambridge

He also acts as a referee for the British Journal of Surgery, the European Journal of Surgical Oncology, and Nuclear Medicine Communications.
