= William Buchan (physician) =

Scottish physician and author (1729–1805)

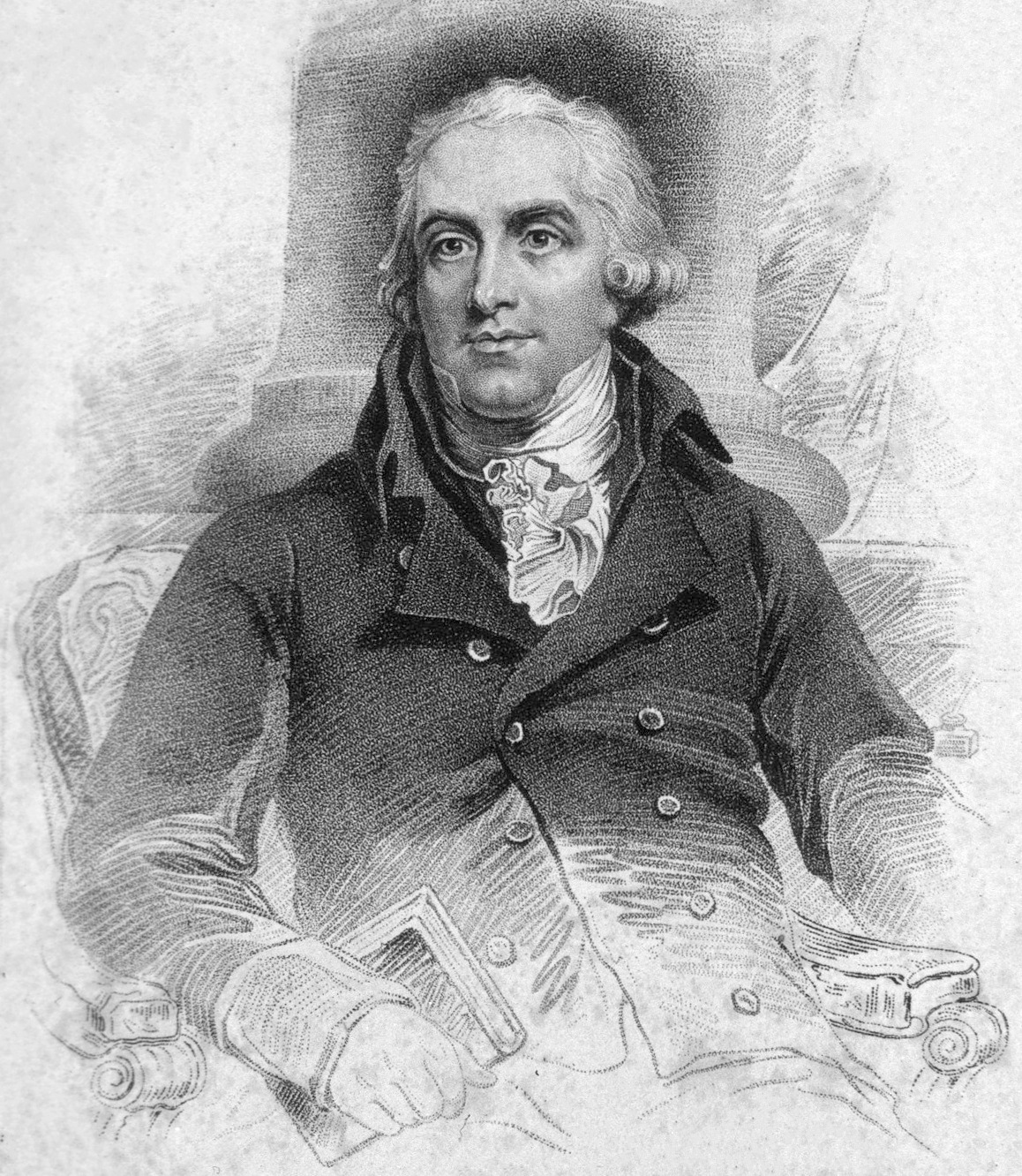
- William Buchan
- Born: 1729; Ancrum, Scotland
- Died: 1805 (aged 75–76)
- Occupation: Scottish physician

William Buchan (1729 – 25 February 1805) was a Scottish physician and writer. He is best known for his work Domestic Medicine: or, a Treatise on the Prevention and Cure of Diseases by Regimen and Simple Medicines, which provided laypeople with detailed descriptions of the causes and prevention of diseases. Buchan's goal was one of "laying medicine more open to mankind." With over 80,000 copies and 19 editions sold in Buchan's lifetime, it was one of the most popular medical texts in Europe and even in the European colonies in the Americas, and was translated into almost every major European language.

== Life and career ==
William Buchan was born in Ancrum, Roxburghshire, Scotland, in 1729. During his early years he attended a local grammar school and took a keen interest in medicine. At an early age with no formal training, he acted as one of the novice village physicians.

Upon entering Edinburgh University in 1749, he enrolled in the School of Divinity under pressure from his family. He soon replaced his theological studies with studies in mathematics, botany, and ultimately medicine. He completed his studies in medicine in 1758 after approximately nine years at the university.

After leaving the university, he started a small practice in rural Yorkshire before being appointed as a physician at the Foundling Hospital in Ackworth, Yorkshire in 1759. At the Foundling Hospital, he worked frequently with children. In 1761 he wrote his medical dissertation, On the Preservation of Infant Life, arguing that far too many infants were dying in Great Britain each year. There was little response to his work.

Soon after, Buchan married a lady of the Dundas clan, one of the most noble clans of Scotland. Later that year, Parliament stopped funding the Foundling Hospital, so Buchan took up a practice in Sheffield from 1761 until 1766, when he returned to Edinburgh. While in Edinburgh, he ran his own practice and gave lectures in Newtonianism and natural philosophy. A son, Alexander Peter Buchan, was born in Sheffield in 1764 and later followed his father into medicine.

William Buchan published his famous work Domestic Medicine in 1769. The first edition sold for only six shillings and was a great success. Domestic Medicine went on to sell over 80,000 copies, and 19 editions were printed, translated into almost every major European language. The German naturalists Spix and Martius, after travelling in Brazil in 1817–1820, wrote that people, even in isolated farms and towns in the interior of the Portuguese colony, consulted the Portuguese translation of Buchan's book in order to treat maladies. In 1772, Buchan became a fellow of the Royal College of Physicians of Edinburgh.

In 1778, Buchan announced his candidacy for the position as chair of the Institute of Medicine upon the death of John Gregory; however, he lost the election. He later moved to London, practicing there until his death on 25 February 1805. He is buried in the cloisters of Westminster Abbey.

== Works ==
=== Domestic Medicine ===
Published in 1769, Domestic Medicine was printed in Britain until 1846 and in the Americas until 1913. Catherine the Great, Czar of Russia, was so impressed by the work that she sent Buchan a gold medal and personal letter.

It was the first text of its kind. Previous to Buchan's work, most medical texts either were theoretical and written for the more educated, or were short manuals not descriptive enough to help diagnose illnesses. A combination of these two styles, Domestic Medicine was written in lay terms in order to reach a wider audience. It described the diseases and treatments thoroughly enough to allow people to create cures themselves. Only Swiss physician Samuel-Auguste Tissot’s Avis au peuple was of similar style, and Buchan acknowledged it influenced his writing.

Buchan experienced wider exposure than Tissot because he addressed new health areas such as industrial diseases. The writing of Domestic Medicine took place near the start of the Industrial Revolution and was welcomed by the industrial workers. Generally, these industrial diseases and cures suffered from secondhand observation rather than more stringent clinical observation; however, their promise of better health garnered general support.

Domestic Medicine also was one of the first texts not only to discuss potential cures to diseases, but also to emphasize prevention. The first third of the text is dedicated to how to prevent a number of diseases, including inoculation against smallpox. Buchan's emphasis on a strict regimen of hygiene and cleanliness extended into moral judgement, in that he argued that immoral people were more likely to develop illness.

Even though Domestic Medicine was groundbreaking in many areas, Buchan's conclusions about health were framed within academic theories of iatrophysics that would dominate the European medical world until the introduction of cell theory in the nineteenth century. The medical recommendations given throughout Domestic Medicine followed the logic that the human body functioned as a hydraulic machine, with one's health dependent on restoring the correct motion of bodily fluids as well as the correct tension of organs, vessels, and other solid parts. Like many physicians at the time, Buchan was a proponent of bloodletting and purging as treatment for inflammatory conditions: these and other evacuation-based therapies were viewed as physical methods of correcting improper solid-fluid tension within the body. Buchan also advocated careful tracking of non-naturals (air, meat and drink, sleeping and watching, exercise and quiet, evacuations and obstructions, and passions).

== Death ==
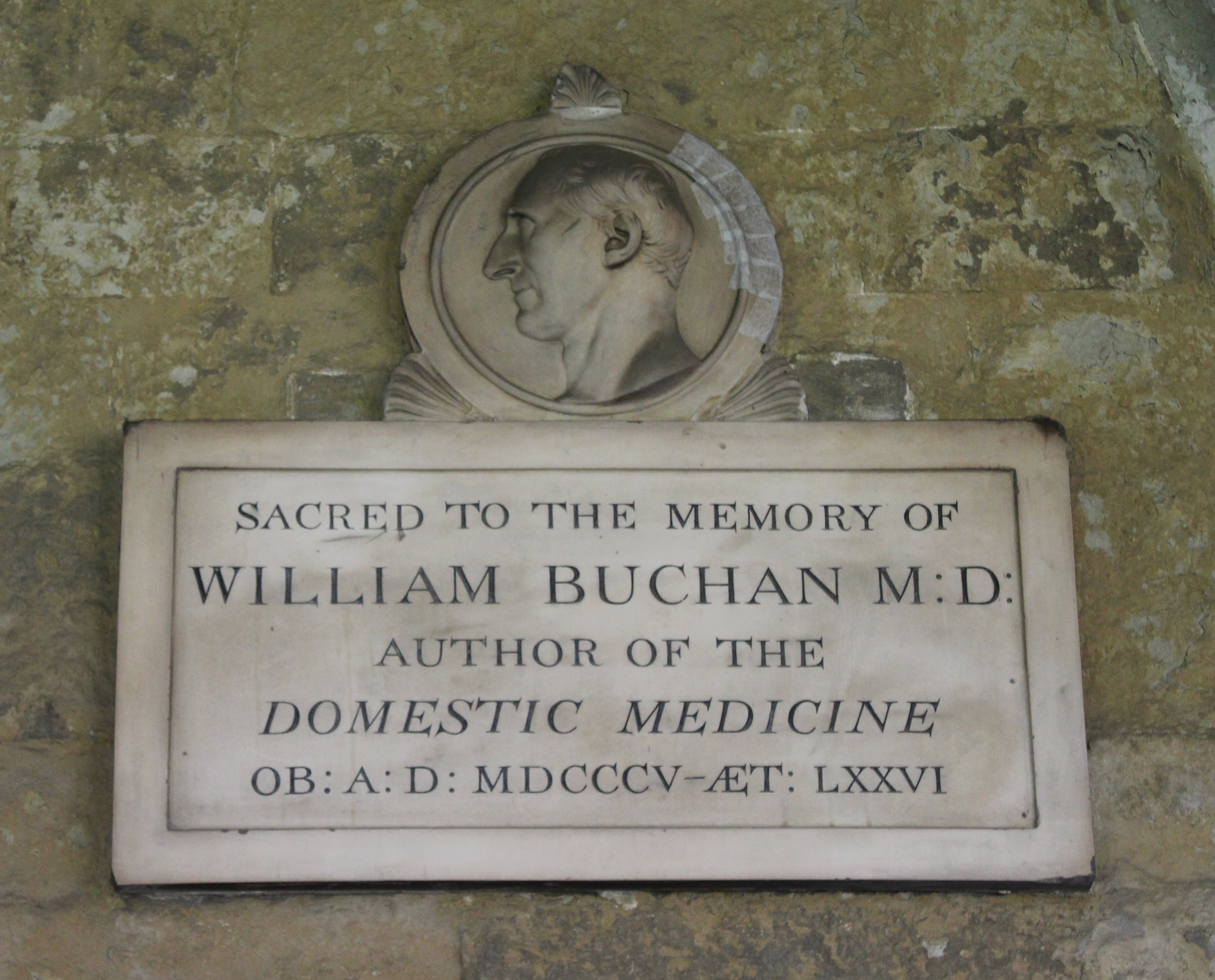
Buchan's memorial tablet, Westminster Abbey

Buchan died on 25 February 1805, at the age of 76. He was buried in Westminster Abbey.

== Bibliography ==
- Domestic Medicine; or the Family physician: being an attempt to render the medical art more generally useful, by shewing people what is in their own power both with respect to the prevention and cure of diseases; chiefly calculated to recommend a proper attention to regimen, and simple medicines. Edinburgh : Balfour; Auld; Smellie, 1769. Digital edition of the University and State Library Düsseldorf
- Médecine domestique, ou Traité complet des moyens de se conserver en Santé, de guérir & de prévenir des maladies, par le régime & les remèdes simples. Tome 1. 4. éd. Paris : Desoer, 1792. Digital edition of the University and State Library Düsseldorf
  - Volume 2
  - Volume 3
  - Volume 4
  - Volume 5
- Domestic Medicine : Or, a Treatise on the Prevention and Cure of Diseases by Regimen and simple Medicines. Fairhaven : Lyon, 1798. Digital edition of the University and State Library Düsseldorf
- Médecine domestique. Ou, Traité complet, des moyens de se conserver en santé, de guérir & de prévenir les maladies, par le régime & les remedes simples. Tome 4. 5. éd. Paris : Moutardier, 1802. Digital edition of the University and State Library Düsseldorf
- Domestic Medicine : or, a Treatise on the Prevention and Cure of Diseases by Regimen and Simple Medicines. Glasgow : Gardner, 1806. Digital edition of the University and State Library Düsseldorf
- Domestic Medicine : or, a Treatise on the Prevention and Cure of Diseases by Regimen and Simple Medicines. London : Oddy, 1813. Digital edition by the University and State Library Düsseldorf
- The new domestic Medicine : or, a Treatise on the Prevention and Cure of Diseases, by Regimen and simple Medicines; with an Appendix, containing a Dispensatory for the Use of Private Practitioners. Ancillary works: To which is now first added, Memoirs of the Life of Dr. Buchan and important extracts from other works, particularly his Advice to Mothers / by William Nisbet. A new Ed., enlarged and improved. London : Kelly, 1814. Digital edition of the University and State Library Düsseldorf
- Domestic Medicine: or, the Family Physician; a Treatise on the Prevention and Cure of Diseases, by Regimen and Simple Medicines. Dunbar : Miller, 1818. Digital edition of the University and State Library Düsseldorf
- Domestic Medicine: or, a Treatise on the Prevention and Cure of Diseases by Regimen and Simple Medicines. London : Lewis, 1830. Digital edition of the University and State Library Düsseldorf
- The Life of Lewis Cornaro, and his Methods of attaining a long and healthful Life. London : Kelly, 1840. Digital edition of the University and State Library Düsseldorf
- The new domestic medicine : or, a treatise on the prevention and cure of diseases, by regimen and simple medicines; with an appendix, containing a dispensatory for the use of private practitioners; with a supplement, containing the life of Lewis Cornaro and his methods of attaining a long and healthful life. London : Kelly, 1840. Digital edition of the University and State Library Düsseldorf
- Buchan's domestic medicine, or, The family physician: designed to render the medical art more generally useful, by showing people what is in their own power, both with respect to the prevention and cure of diseases : chiefly calculated to recommend a proper attention to regimen, and simple medicines. Hartford : Andrus, 1840. Digital edition of the University and State Library Düsseldorf
- Buchan, W. (1761) "On the Preservation of Infant Life." Doctoral dissertation, University of Edinburgh, Edinburgh, Scotland.

== See also ==
- Domestic medicine
