= Richard Eastell =

British doctor and academic

Richard Eastell FRCP FRCPE FRCPI FRCPath FMedSci
- Born: 12 February 1953 (age 73); Shipley, West Riding of Yorkshire, England
- Scientific career
- Fields: osteology
- Workplaces: University of Sheffield

Richard Eastell (born 12 February 1953) is a British medical doctor and Professor of Bone Metabolism at the University of Sheffield. He was born in Shipley, West Yorkshire, later graduating from the University of Edinburgh in 1977 with an MB ChB and in 1984 with an MD and achieved prominence as an expert in osteoporosis.

== Career ==
Eastell has pioneered new techniques for measuring calcium uptake and vitamin D conversion and is a leading expert in osteoporosis diagnosis, implementation of bone turnover markers and new osteoporosis treatments.

While at the Mayo Clinic, Eastell developed new non-radioactive methods for measuring how calcium was absorbed from the diet and a new technique for measuring 1,25-OH2D3 production as well as refining the use of bone densitometry and a new approach for identifying vertebral fractures on radiographs of the spine. After returning to the UK, Eastell set up a metabolic bone service at the Northern General Hospital. More recent contributions have been within the area of biochemical bone turnover markers and leadership of clinical trials in the osteoporosis area for new osteoporosis treatments.

Eastell is a Professor of Bone Metabolism at the University of Sheffield and Director of the Mellanby Centre for Musculoskeletal Research. Eastell has supervised the study for 37 doctoral degrees over the past 30 years and published over 550 research papers.

In 2005, a report was published in the Times Higher Education Supplement alleging that Eastell had incorrectly claimed to have had full access to data for a trial of the Procter & Gamble drug Actonel. The report claimed that the analysis for the trial had been carried out by Procter & Gamble and that Eastell did not in fact have complete access to the data. At a General Medical Council "fitness to practice" hearing in November 2009, it was determined that Eastell's actions had not been "deliberately misleading or dishonest", although he may have been negligent in making "untrue" and "misleading" declarations.

== Recent Awards and Honours ==
- Linda Edwards Award for Excellence in Osteoporosis Research, National Osteoporosis Society, 2018
- Clinical Endocrinology Trust Award, European Society for Endocrinology, 2020
- Dent Lecturer, Bone Research Society, 2020
- William F Neuman Award, American Society for Bone and Mineral Research, 2023
