= Kerry Lang =

British triathlete (born 1976)

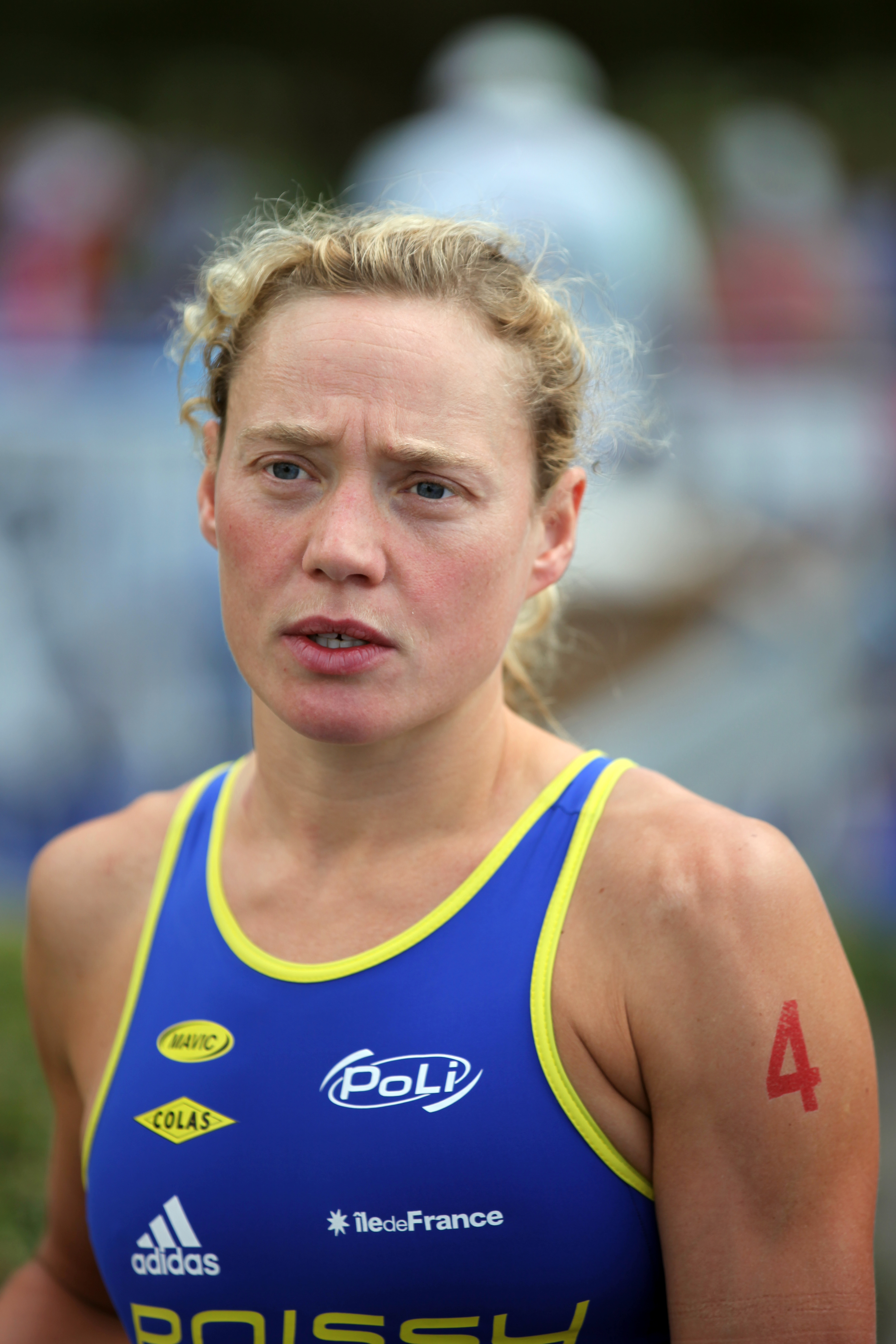
Kerry Lang at the French Grand Prix (Lyonnaise des Eaux) triathlon in Tours, 2011.

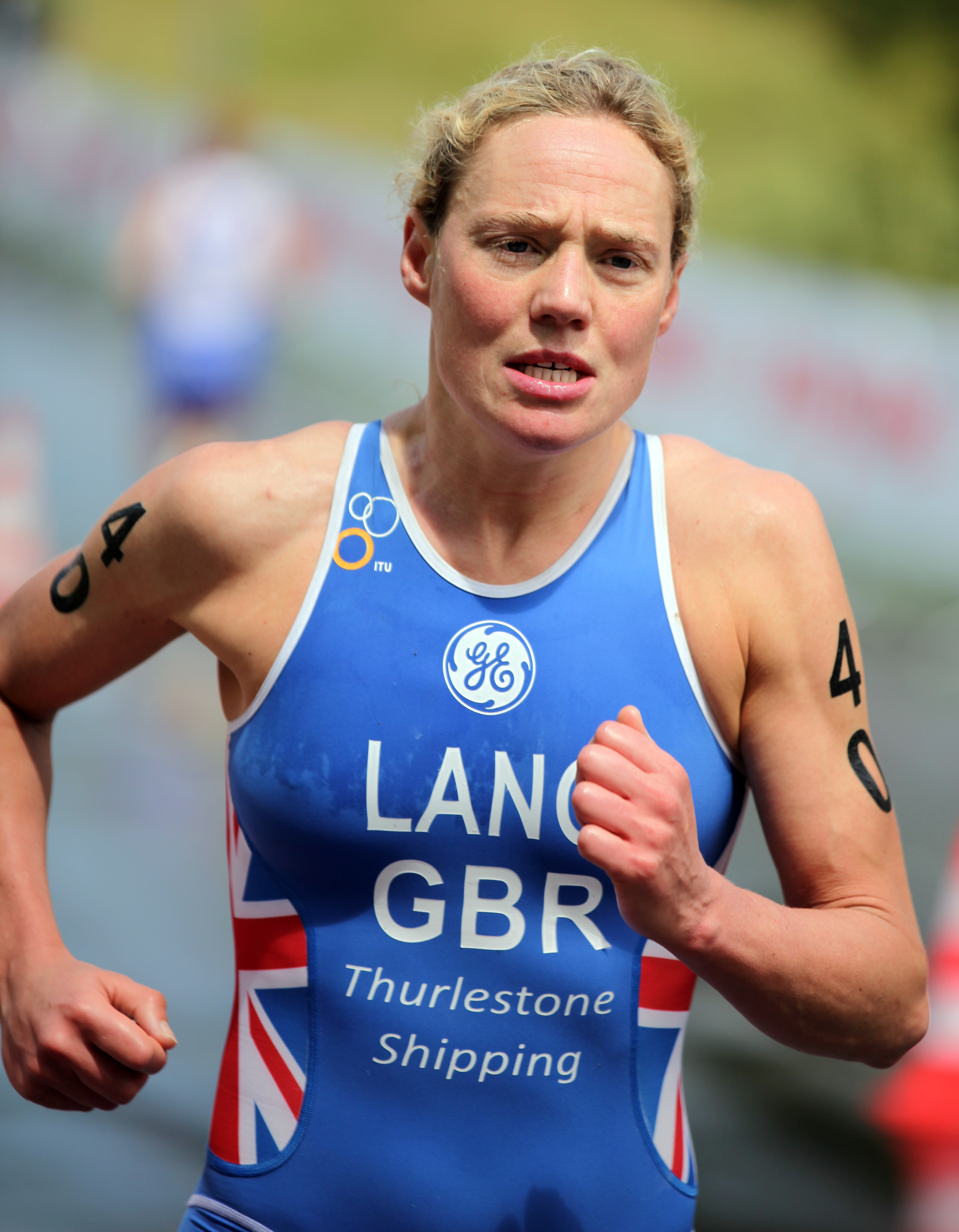
Kerry Lang at the World Championship Series triathlon in Kitzbühel, 2011.

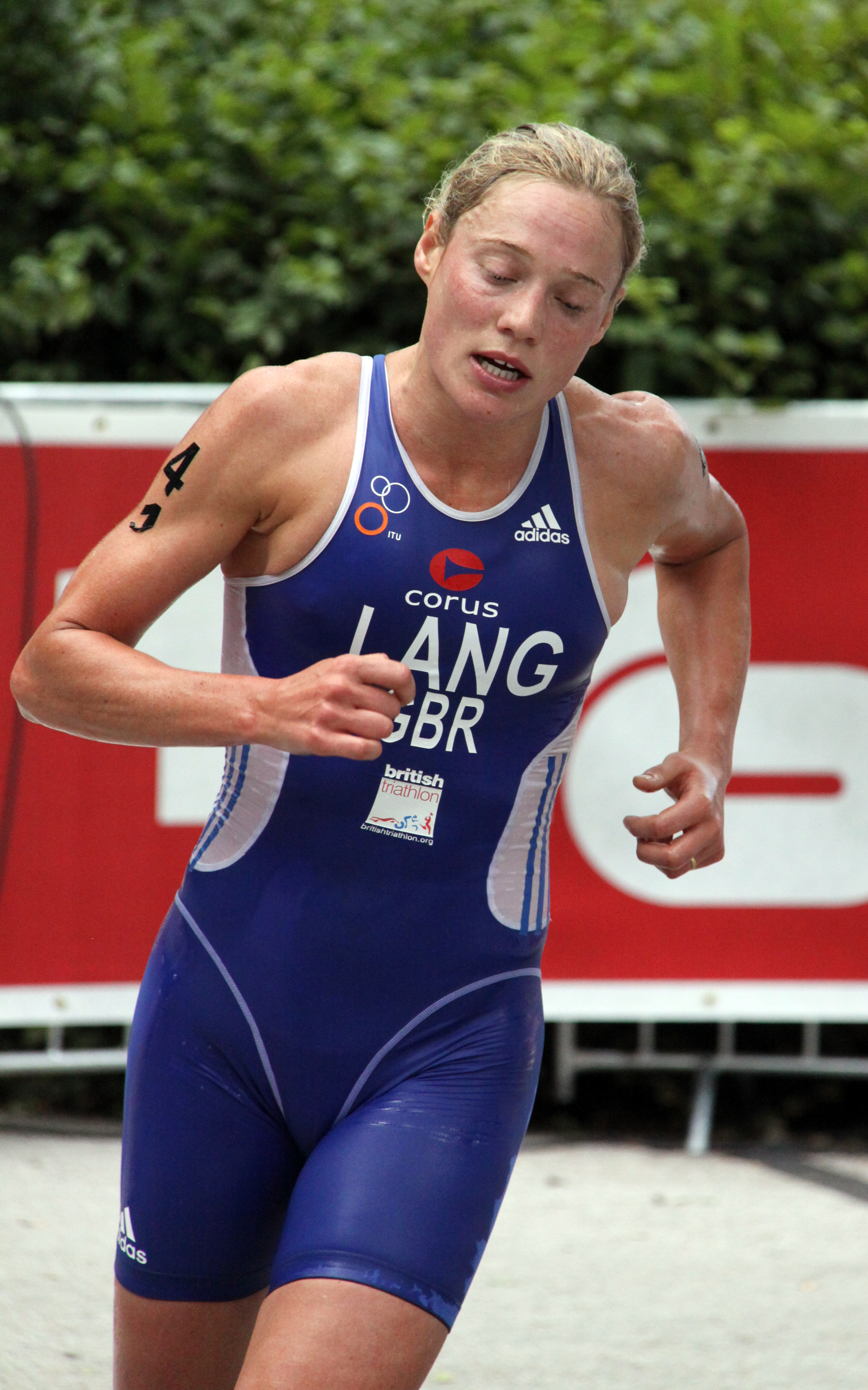
Kerry Lang at the World Championship Series triathlon in Kitzbühel, 2010.

Kerry Jeanetta Lang (born 24 January 1976, in Glasgow, Scotland) is a British professional triathlete, Scottish Duathlon Champion and British Triathlon Vice Champion of the year 2009, and Scottish Road Race (Bike) Champion of the years 2007 and 2008. She has represented Great Britain in the World Championship Series since 2009 and she represented Great Britain in the Series' precursor, the BG World Cup, in 2007 and 2008.

== Sports career ==
Kerry Lang started her ITU career in 2004, when she won her first European Cup medal. In the seven years from 2004 to 2010, Lang took part in 39 ITU competitions and achieved 8 top ten positions. In the World Championship Series Ranking2011, Lang fell back to the 63rd position (August 2011) because she did not finish two races.

Kerry Lang also takes part in non ITU events, in 2011, for instance, she won the 15th International Lanzarote Duathlon (22 January 2011).

In France, Lang has represented the club Poissy at the prestigious Club Championship Series Lyonnaise des Eaux since 2008. In 2010, she placed 12th and 14th in Beauvais and Paris respectively. In 2011, she took part in the Grand Prix triathlon at Tours (28 August 2011), for this race, however, there is no individual ranking.

Kerry Lang holds a degree from the University of Edinburgh Medical School (MBChB, 1998) and from the Royal College of Surgeons (MRCS, Glasgow 2001). She works in the ear, nose and throat department of Glasgow's Southern General Hospital. Kerry Lang lives in Elderslie. Her coach is Marc Jenkins, the husband of the Welsh triathlete Helen Jenkins.

== ITU Competitions ==
The following list is based upon the official ITU rankings and the ITU Athletes's Profile Page. Unless indicated otherwise, the following events are triathlons (Olympic Distance) and refer to the Elite category.

Date	Competition	Place	Rank
2004-03-06	Pan American Cup	Roatan	20
2004-07-10	European Cup	Echternach	10
2004-08-14	European Cup	Lough Neagh	3
2005-04-24	World Cup	Mazatlan	9
2005-05-15	World Cup	Ishigaki	13
2005-08-06	World Cup	Hamburg	DNF
2005-08-14	World Cup	Tiszaújváros	11
2005-09-17	OSIM World Cup	Beijing	24
2006-02-19	Oceania Cup	Hobart	DNF
2006-03-18	Commonwealth Games	Melbourne	18
2006-03-26	World Cup	Mooloolaba	17
2006-05-07	World Cup	Mazatlan	17
2007-07-01	Asian Cup	Shichigahama	2
2007-07-29	BG World Cup	Salford	22
2007-08-11	BG World Cup	Tiszaújváros	DNF
2007-08-30	BG World Championships	Hamburg	50
2007-10-07	BG World Cup	Rhodes	15
2007-11-04	BG World Cup	Cancun	8
2007-12-01	BG World Cup	Eilat	DNF
2008-02-23	African Cup	Bloemfontein	2
2008-03-30	BG World Cup	Mooloolaba	17
2008-04-06	BG World Cup	New Plymouth	18
2008-04-13	BG World Cup	Ishigaki	11
2008-05-04	BG World Cup	Richards Bay	25
2008-05-10	European Championships	Lisbon	17
2008-05-25	BG World Cup	Madrid	15
2008-06-05	BG World Championships	Vancouver	30
2008-09-27	BG World Cup	Lorient	DNS
2009-05-02	Dextro Energy World Championship Series	Tongyeong	33
2009-06-21	Dextro Energy World Championship Series	Washington DC	21
2009-06-27	Elite Cup	Hy-Vee	22
2009-07-11	Dextro Energy World Championship Series	Kitzbühel	28
2009-08-15	Dextro Energy World Championship Series	London	25
2009-09-09	Dextro Energy World Championship Series: Grand Final	Gold Coast	21
2010-05-08	Dextro Energy World Championship Series	Seoul	26
2010-06-05	Dextro Energy World Championship Series	Madrid	37
2010-07-10	World Cup	Holten	7
2010-08-14	Dextro Energy World Championship Series	Kitzbühel	28
2010-09-08	Dextro Energy World Championship Series: Grand Final	Budapest	33
2010-10-10	World Cup	Huatulco	7
2011-03-05	Sprint Pan American Cup	Clermont	6
2011-03-26	World Cup	Mooloolaba	10
2011-04-09	Dextro Energy World Championship Series	Sydney	36
2011-04-17	World Cup	Ishigaki	37
2011-06-18	Dextro Energy World Championship Series	Kitzbühel	DNF
2011-07-09	Premium European Cup	Holten	3
2011-07-16	Dextro Energy World Championship Series	Hamburg	DNF
2011-07-31	Premium European Cup	Banyoles	8
2011-08-06	Dextro Energy World Championship Series	London	52
2011-08-14	World Cup	Tiszaújváros	15

DNF = did not finish · DNS = did not start · BG = the sponsor British Gas
