= Liston knife =

Type of surgical knife

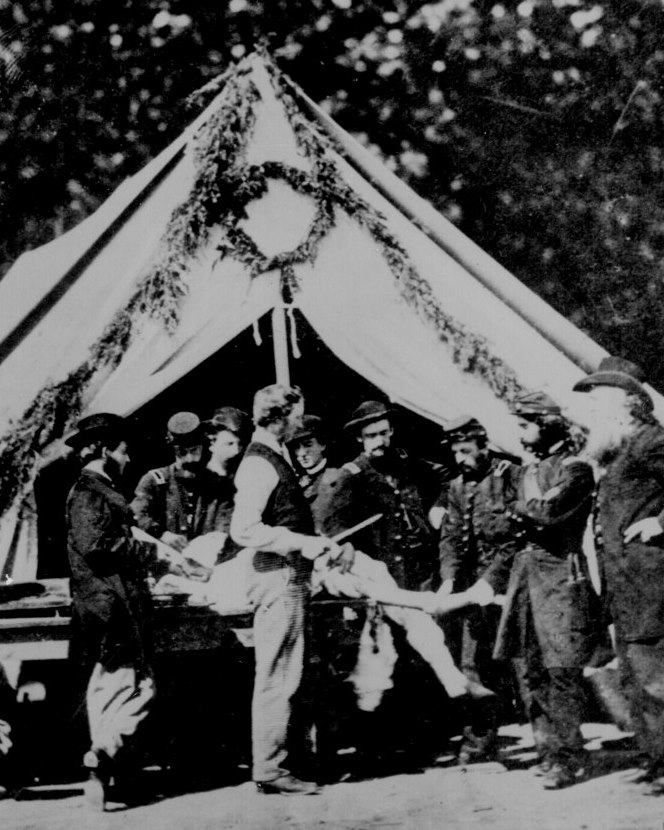
At the headquarters of the U.S. Sanitary Commission at Camp Letterman in Gettysburg, Pennsylvania, a physician wields a liston knife (center) as a patient (in white) is held down on a table for an amputation.

The Liston knife is a type of knife used in surgical amputation.

The knife was named after Robert Liston, a Scottish surgeon noted for his skill and speed in an era prior to anaesthetics, when speed made a difference in terms of pain and survival. The knife was made out of high-quality metal and had a typical blade length of 6–8 inches. Surgical amputation knives came in many styles and changed very much between 1840 and the American Civil War. These changes reflect changes in techniques used by the surgeons and makers of surgical knives during the period.

Amputation blades from the 18th century to the 1840s are generally known for their distinctive "down" curving blades. By 1870, amputation blades had become straighter, and more closely resembled the "Liston" European style. Since the Crimean War ended in 1856, it is likely the American Civil War had a greater impact on long slender blade style than the actual Dr. Liston. The dedicated task of amputation may be more responsible for the Liston title than any specific design.

It is noted by collectors that the handles on earlier knives (pre-1850) are of a much bigger and heavier construction.

The majority of the history of amputation blade evolution is referenced from the medical textbook Handbook of Surgical Operations, U.S.A. Medical Department, 1863, written during the Civil War by Stephen Smith, M.D., with various drawings from the medical literature credited to Bourgery & Jocob.

== In popular culture ==
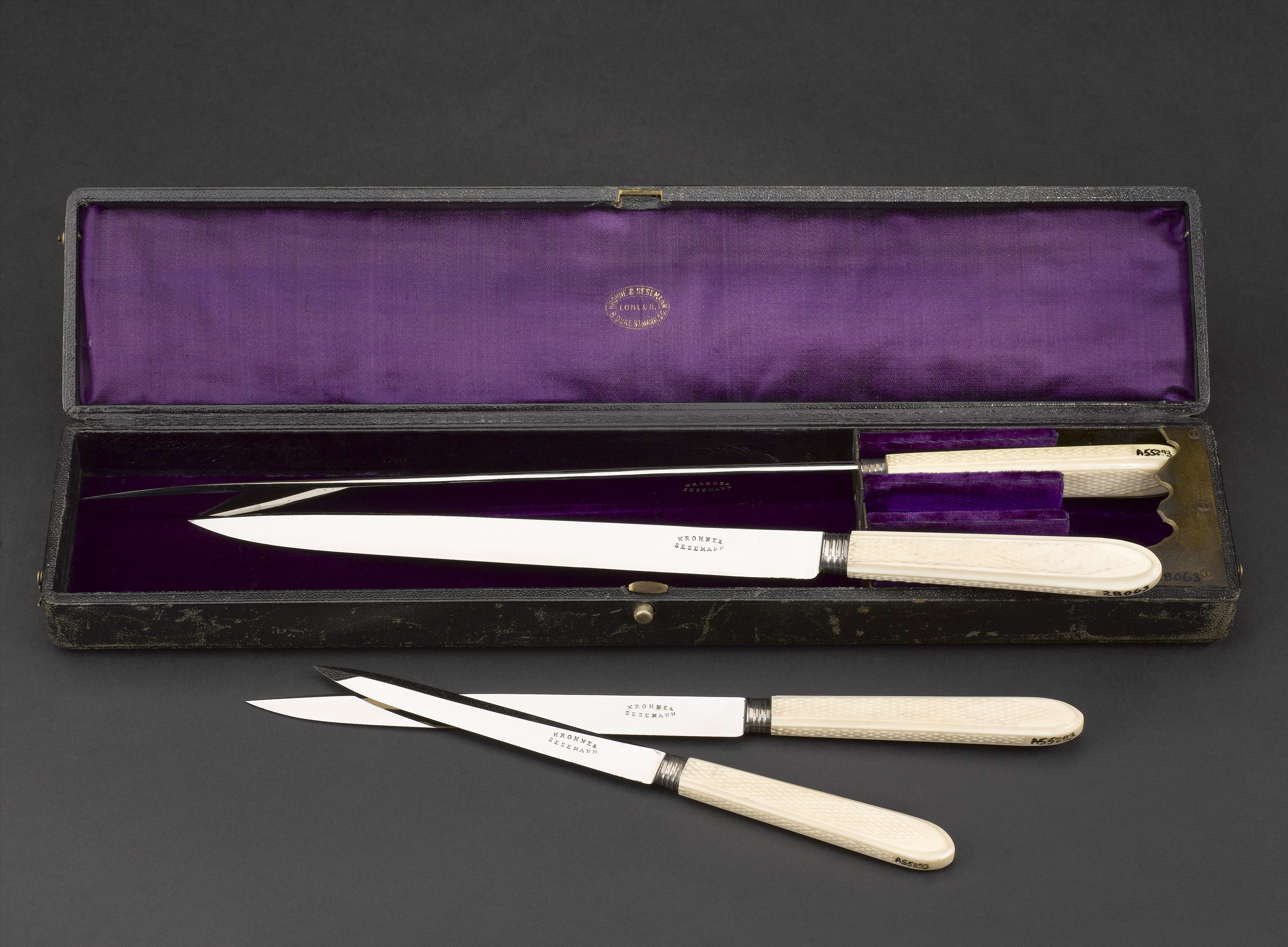
Set of four Liston-type amputation knives, London, England, 1860

The knife has gained association with Jack the Ripper fiction due to its mention in the From Hell graphic novel and film adaptation.

A liston knife appears as a weapon in the 2018 video game Vampyr. It is also featured in the 2019 video game Days Gone as an item that must be collected for a survivor camp infirmary.

== See also ==
- Instruments used in general surgery
