= Alexander Biggam =

British Army general (1888–1963)

Major-General Sir Alexander Biggam KBE CB FRSE FRCPE FRCP
- Biggam in 1942
- Born: 14 April 1888; Stranraer
- Died: 22 March 1963 (aged 74)

Major-General Sir Alexander Gordon Biggam KBE CB FRSE FRCPE FRCP (14 April 1888 – 22 March 1963) was a Scottish physician and British Army officer who served as Director of Study of Edinburgh Post-Graduate Board for Medicine.

== Life ==
Biggam was born in Stranraer, the son of J. Biggam of Laigh Glenstockadale, in the parish of Leswalt.

Educated at George Watson's College, Edinburgh, and the University of Edinburgh (MB ChB, 1911; MD 1924) Biggam started his career as a House Physician and Surgeon at Edinburgh Royal Infirmary. In 1912 he was commissioned in the Royal Army Medical Corps and saw active service in France during World War I, where he was wounded in 1915. He then saw service in India from 1916 to 1921. He was awarded the OBE for services with the Waziristan Field Force (1919–21) on the North-West Frontier of India.

Biggam was director of the medical unit at Kasr-el-Aini Hospital in Cairo, and Professor of Clinical Medicine at the Egyptian University (1926–33), for which he was awarded the Order of the Nile 3rd class. He served as examiner in medicine for the Kitchener School of Medicine in Khartoum and the American University of Beirut. He was appointed an honorary physician to King George VI in 1937.

Biggam served in India and Burma during World War II and was Consulting Physician to the Army during 1941-7. He was made a CBE in 1940, appointed a CB in 1944 and appointed KBE in 1946.

After the war he returned to Scotland, taking up the post of senior lecturer in tropical medicine at the University of Edinburgh in 1947. He was elected a member of the Harveian Society of Edinburgh in 1948. He was elected a Fellow of the Royal Society of Edinburgh in 1950, his proposers were Douglas Guthrie, John Gaddum, Sir Alexander Gray and Angus Sinclair.
