= Varsha Jain =

British space gynaecologist

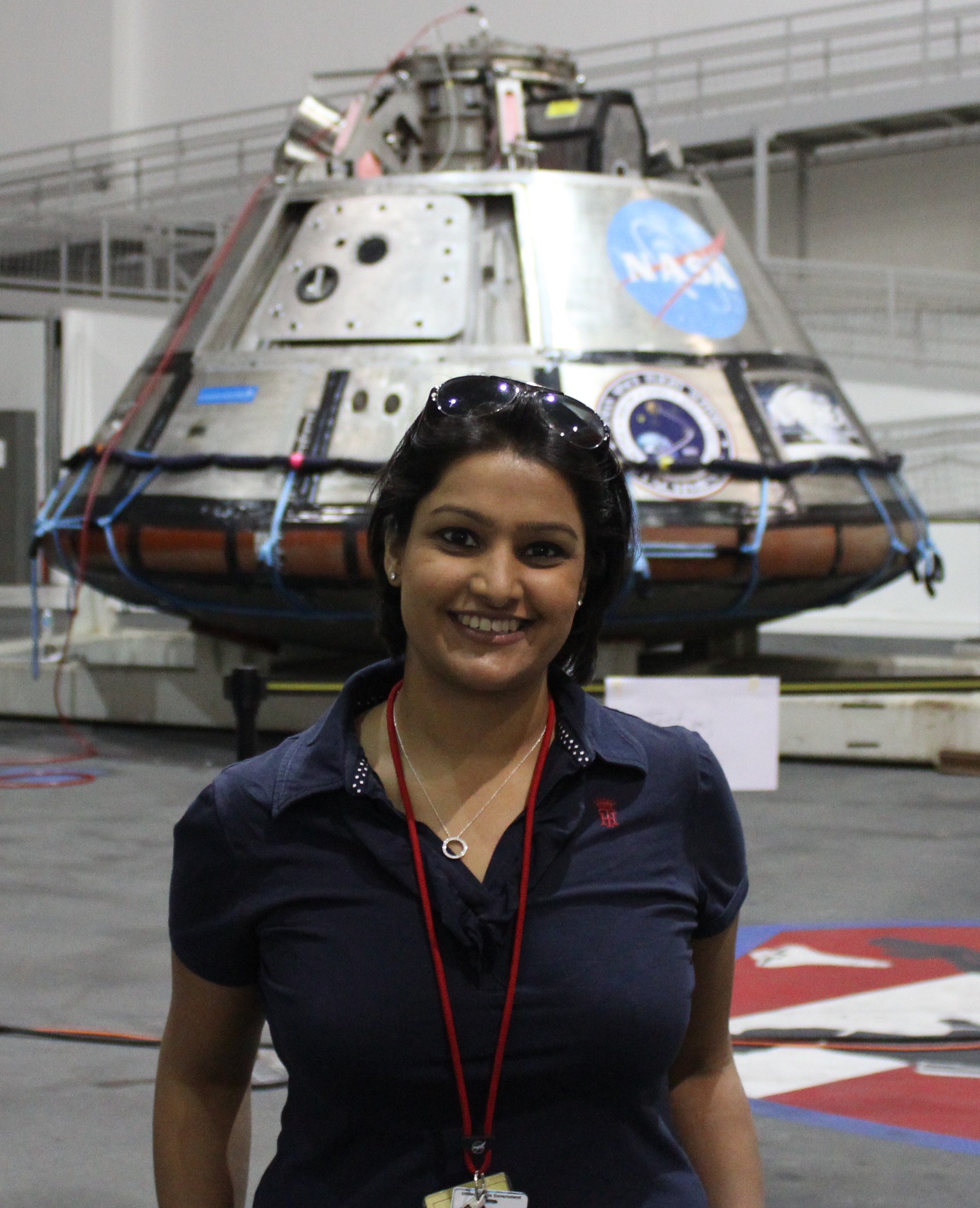
- Dr Varsha Jain with NASA Orion Capsule
- Education: University College London; Imperial College London; King's College, London
- Occupations: Physician, medical researcher
- Employer: University of Edinburgh
- Known for: Research into women's reproductive health in space

Varsha Jain is a British physician and researcher at the University of Edinburgh, who specialises in obstetrics and gynaecology. Her research on women's health in relation to space has led to her earning the nickname "space gynaecologist".

== Early life and education ==
Jain grew up in the Greater Birmingham area of England. She developed an early interest in medicine and space through watching Star Trek with her brothers and seeing the fictional Dr. Beverly Crusher. While at school, Jain decided to pursue medicine for higher education rather than astrophysics, motivated by her desire to help others. Her specific interest in space medicine grew after attending the UK Space Biomedicine Conference in 2004.

In 2006, Jain graduated from University College London with an intercalated Bachelor of Science (BSc) degree focusing on extreme environments physiology. She subsequently obtained her medical degree (MBBS) from Imperial College London in 2008.

The NASA Lyndon B. Johnson Space Center, where Jain studied and worked

During her studies, Jain undertook a seven-week placement at the NASA Johnson Space Center in 2007, where she worked with a neuroscience research team investigating balance and recovery in astronauts following spaceflight.

In 2012, Jain obtained a Master of Science (MSc) degree in space physiology and health at King's College London. She conducted her dissertation project at NASA Johnson Space Center working with the Exploration Medical Capability Team to evaluate the effectiveness of medical diagnostic and treatment systems aboard the International Space Station.

== Career and research ==
In 2012, she was awarded an NIHR Academic Clinical Fellowship in the UK and focused her research purely on women's health in space. In 2019, she awarded a Wellbeing of Women clinical research training fellowship and with this she moved to Scotland to works as a researcher at the University of Edinburgh. Her research concerns endometrial phenotype in women with Abnormal Uterine Bleeding to understand why women suffer from heavy periods.

Jain's interest in the health of women in space is unusual for a doctor working in academia. She has been consulted on her knowledge of how women astronauts deal with toilets, menstruation and the risk to the eggs that they carry. There are going to be more female astronauts, as NASA and the European Space Agency (ESA) increase their recruitment of female candidates. In 2020, she worked with a team of experts for ESA to create the first research agenda for reproductive health by any space agency. It is noted that the average age for a female astronaut to have her first baby is between 38 - 41. Jain was asked if she would go into space and she welcomed a short trip but feared the damage done to those who were in space for some time. Jain has expressed the importance of conducting research on women's health in space as she feels it will benefit women's health on Earth. In 2022, she was awarded an IRR Early Career Innovator prize.
