= The Britons =

English antisemitic and anti-immigration organisation

- Successor: Britons Publishing Society (incorporated 1922) (dissolved and defunct, 1975)
- Formation: 1919
- Founder: Henry Hamilton Beamish
- Dissolved: 1931 (chiefly limited to publishing house and its sponsorship)
- Type: Nationalism; Antisemitism; Racial discrimination Cultural conservatism
- Location: United Kingdom
- Key people: John Henry Clarke

The Britons was an English antisemitic and anti-immigration organisation founded in July 1919 by Henry Hamilton Beamish and John Henry Clarke. The organisation published pamphlets and propaganda under the names Judaic Publishing Co. and later The Britons, and (The) Britons Publishing Society. These entities mainly engaged in disseminating antisemitic literature and rhetoric in the United Kingdom. The organisation was on the forefront of British Fascists. Imprints under the first label exist for 1920, 1921, and 1922.

According to historian Sharman Kadish, The Britons was "the most extreme group disseminating anti-Semitic propaganda in the early 1920s - indeed the first organisation set up in Britain for this express purpose."

== History ==
The group was founded in London in 1919 by Henry Hamilton Beamish, who had developed an antisemitic worldview while living in South Africa. Beamish wrote the Britons' constitution and the group was launched at a meeting of 14 people chaired by John Henry Clarke. The group held monthly meetings in London and launched its own publishing imprint, The Judaic Publishing Company Ltd., which was to be the source of much antisemitic and conspiratorial literature. Beamish became involved with the Silver Badge Party but by 1919 had left Britain altogether after facing damages for a libellous poster against Sir Alfred Mond and, becoming a vehement antisemite, progressing to Nazi propagandist.

The Britons continued under John Henry Clarke, an advocate of homeopathy, as Chairman and Vice-President (with the Southern Rhodesia-based Beamish continuing as president) from the formation of the group until his death in 1931. Clarke helped the party to work with the right wing of the Conservative Party, and to attract such members as Arthur Kitson and Brigadier-General R. B. D. Blakeney.

The group claimed that its only aim was to get rid of all the Jews in Britain by forcing them to emigrate to Palestine. Only those who could prove English blood up to grandparent level were allowed membership (despite the name 'Britons'). Group activities centred mainly on publishing, with journals such as Jewry Uber Alles, The British Guardian and The Investigator (which began publishing in 1937 and used a swastika as its emblem and regular motto 'For Crown and Country, Blood and Soil). These featured contributions from some of the most fanatical and notorious antisemites of the time, including Joseph Banister and George Clarke, 1st Baron Sydenham of Combe, as well as translations of work by Nazi race theorist Alfred Rosenberg.

They also published antisemitic books including a translation, allegedly by Victor E. Marsden, of The Protocols of the Elders of Zion. It has been observed that Marsden had died on 28 October 1920; the Britons ceased publication of the first imprint which Norman Cohn states came out in 1921. However, the earliest imprint bearing the name of Marsden held by the British Library is dated 1922 and whose online catalogue shows that it was imprinted by the Britons Publishing Society. No scholarly work exists on Marsden, a one-time correspondent for The Morning Post, and there has not yet been an accounting of how precisely his name came to be associated with the publication of The Protocols. In August 1921, the text was conclusively exposed by Philip Graves of The Times as plagiarism. The translation used was made by George Shanks for Eyre & Spottiswoode. Researcher Nick Toczek claims that for the sum of £30, The Britons purchased a set of printing plates and the publishing rights to The Jewish Peril: The Protocols of the Learned Elders of Zion from that company. The Britons continued to publish and sell The Protocols for the rest of their existence, eventually producing 85 editions. Known from 1922 onwards as the Britons Publishing Company, this separate publishing arm produced material for such groups as the British Union of Fascists and other UK antisemitic and fascist organizations until 1975.

Short of funding, the Britons was little more than the board of the publishing "house" after Clarke's death in 1931, soon run by solicitor James D. Dell until 1949. It was largely inactive during the Second World War. It was later revived first by Anthony Gittens and then by A. F. X. Baron. The board launched a new antisemitic, far-right publication Free Britain, which featured contributions from Arnold Leese and Colin Jordan, but was largely defunct as a political organization by the 1950s.

== See also ==
- Henry Hamilton Beamish
