= Henry Hamilton Beamish =

British antisemitic activist (1873–1948)

- Born: 2 June 1873; St George's, Hanover Square, England, UK
- Died: 27 March 1948 (aged 74); UK
- Occupation: Journalist
- Known for: Antisemitic writer and activist
- Political party: The Britons

Henry Hamilton Beamish (2 June 1873 – 27 March 1948) was a leading British antisemitic journalist and the founder of The Britons in 1919, the first organisation set up in Britain for the express purpose of diffusing antisemitic propaganda. After a conviction for libel the same year, Beamish fled Britain and began a career of touring speaker, travelling to Germany, Canada, the United States or Japan in order to promote antisemitic and fascist causes. In 1923, he spoke at one of Adolf Hitler's meetings in Munich, and met Julius Streicher in Nuremberg in 1937. Beamish settled in Southern Rhodesia in 1938, where he served as an independent member of the Southern Rhodesian Legislative Assembly between 1938 and 1940. During the Second World War, he was interned for three years due to his pro-Nazi sentiments. Upon his release, Beamish returned to England and died in March 1948, aged 74.

== Biography ==
=== Early life and education ===
Henry Hamilton Beamish was born on 2 June 1873, the fifth son of Blanche Georgina Hughes (1840–1904) and Rear-Admiral Henry Hamilton Beamish (1829–1911), a former A.D.C. to Queen Victoria. His birth was registered at the civil parish of St George, Hanover Square in London. Beamish's father came from a prosperous family of Anglo-Irish landowners, although their wealth had already melted away by the time of his parents' birth. His mother was the granddaughter of General Sir Loftus William Otway; the Otway family possessed Castle Otway in County Tipperary, Ireland. Beamish's brother, Rear-Admiral Tufton Beamish (1874–1951), served as a Conservative MP for Lewes in 1924–1931 and 1936–1945.

Beamish attended Romanoff House Boys' School in Tunbridge Wells, Kent, then left home at 16. In the UK 1891 Census, he appears as a 17-year-old agricultural student at the Colonial College in Hollesley, in Suffolk.

=== Canada, Ceylon and South Africa ===
In 1891 Beamish became a fur trader in Quebec, and he is reported as a participant in an expedition to the North Pole in 1892. He moved to Ceylon in 1895 to work on tea plantations. Between 1898 and 1899, Beamish served as an assistant manager on the Hope Estate in Upper Hewaheta, then as a second lieutenant with the Ceylon Planters Rifle Corps during the Second Boer War (1899–1902), leaving Ceylon for South Africa in April 1900. He returned to Ceylon two years later in July 1902.

Beamish then settled in Bloemfontein, South Africa, where he ran a company named Empire Tea Rooms along with a friend. In 1904 he started one of the country's first agricultural newspapers, the Farmer's Advocate, which he ran for 15 years. In 1907 Beamish represented the Orange River Colony settlers at a London conference with the British government, and he met in 1908 with The 1st Earl of Crewe—then the Secretary of State for the Colonies—to promote the interests of South African settlers. Beamish founded in 1914 the British Citizen Movement (BCM), an anti-German organisation which campaigned for the purchase of British products to support the war effort; he then became involved with the Consumers' Alliance, which advocated for the exclusion of Germans from business in South Africa.

During the First World War, Beamish served in the Natal Regiment of South African Infantry. Thereafter, he moved back to England, convinced from his experiences in Africa of having "discovered" a world-wide Jewish conspiracy.

=== Antisemitic activism in Britain ===
Upon returning to London, Beamish ran as an independent candidate in the 1918 Clapham by-election, pledging to "support the Premier in ousting the Hun and making Germany pay for the War". He polled 43%, losing against a government candidate by 1,181 votes. In December 1918 Beamish ran again as a parliamentary candidate for the National Federation of Discharged Sailors and Soldiers, coming out second by 6,706 votes.

He became involved with the Vigilante League led by Noel Pemberton Billing. After a split within the League, he and Dr J. H. Clarke founded The Britons in 1919 as an organisation specifically set up for the diffusion of antisemitic propaganda. Beamish also befriended Lieutenant-Commander Harry M. Frazer, the founder of the Silver Badge Party. In a deliberate provocation conceived to draw public attention, Beamish and Frazer produced a poster in March 1919 denouncing British-Jewish politician Sir Alfred Mond, then the First Commissioner of Works, as a traitor to his country. This resulted in a libel suit filed by Mond, who was successfully awarded £5,000 by a court. Beamish fled Britain to South Africa in order to escape the payment.

After that event, Beamish rarely returned to Britain and travelled the world to preach antisemitism. Although he remained nominally president of The Britons until his death in 1947, Beamish subsequently participated little in the activities of the organisation, apart from two spectacular reappearances in 1923 and 1932.

=== Self-exile ===
Beamish settled in Rhodesia in 1920, then he travelled to Germany in 1923 where he addressed one of Hitler's meetings at the Circus Krone on January 18, with a speech delivered in English and translated by Dietrich Eckart. He has claimed, rather dubiously, to have taught Adolf Hitler. Beamish served as vice-president of the Imperial Fascist League. In 1932 he addressed a meeting of the New Party alongside Arnold Leese on the subject of "The Blindness of British Politics under the Jew Money-Power". Beamish had otherwise little involvement with the initiatives of Oswald Mosley. Described by a South African judge in 1934 as an "anti-Jewish fanatic", he travelled to the US in 1935, acting as a "transatlantic go-between for pro-Nazi Jew-hatred". In 1936 Beamish returned to England and became involved with the Nordic League, an antisemitic organisation founded with German assistance one year earlier.

In September 1936 Beamish visited Japan, then spoke at a meeting of the Canadian Nationalist Party in Winnipeg in October, before embarking in December on a major lecture tour of Nazi Germany as a guest of Foreign Minister Joachim von Ribbentrop. He met fellow fanatical antisemite Julius Streicher in Nuremberg in January 1937. In September of the same year, Beamish attended an international antisemitic congress organised by Ulrich Fleischhauer. Beamish also spoke at meetings in North America with Canadian fascist leader Adrien Arcand, including some hosted by the German American Bund.

=== Later life and death ===
Beamish returned to Southern Rhodesia in 1938. He became an independent Member of the Southern Rhodesian Legislative Assembly in August 1938 following a by-election, but lost his seat in the April 1939 election. From June 1940, he was interned for his pro-Nazi sentiments. Upon his release in July 1943, Beamish moved to a farm near Salisbury in England. By then, he had distanced himself from The Britons, whom he accused in a letter wrote two months before his death of departing from the "sole purpose" of the organisation, that is "exposing the Jewish Menace". Beamish died on 27 March 1948.

== Views ==
Beamish was one of the earliest proponents of the Madagascar Plan for the Jewish Question. In the early 1920s he proclaimed that "Bolshevism was Judaism".

== Bibliography ==
- Benewick, Robert (1969). Political Violence & Public Order: A Study of British Fascism. Allen Lane. ISBN 978-0713900859.
- Griffiths, Richard (1983). Fellow Travellers of the Right: British Enthusiasts for Nazi Germany, 1933-9. Oxford University Press. ISBN 978-0-19-285116-1.
- Kadish, Sharman (2013). Bolsheviks and British Jews: The Anglo-Jewish Community, Britain and the Russian Revolution. Routledge. ISBN 978-1-134-72793-3.
- Lebzelter, Gisela C. (1978). Political Anti-Semitism in England 1918–1939. Springer. ISBN 978-1-349-04000-1.
- Macklin, Graham (2020). Failed Führers: A History of Britain's Extreme Right. Routledge.
- Thurlow, Richard C. (1987). Fascism in Britain: A History, 1918–1985. Blackwell. ISBN 978-0-631-13618-7.
- Toczek, Nick (2015). Haters, Baiters and Would-Be Dictators: Anti-Semitism and the UK Far Right. Routledge. ISBN 978-1-317-52587-5.

Southern Rhodesian Legislative Assembly
Preceded by Roger Edward Downes	Member of Parliament for Hartley; 1938 – 1939	Succeeded by Hugh Volant Wheeler
