= List of Allied traitors during World War II =

The following is an incomplete list of people from Allied countries suspected of treachery or treason during World War II. It is not a list of Nazi war criminals.

== Canada ==
- Kanao Inouye - Guilty of treason, executed on 27 August 1947
- Edwin Barnard Martin - Member of British Free Corps - Guilty of aiding the enemy, sentenced to 25 years imprisonment.

== New Zealand ==
- Roy Nicolas Courlander - a British-born New Zealand soldier with a history of petty crime, he was taken prisoner during the Greece campaign in April 1941. Attracted by his anti-communist views, the Germans recruited him for the Waffen-SS British Free Corps, where Courlander reached the rank of Unterscharführer. He was tried at the end of the war by court martial by the New Zealand military authorities in Westgate-on-Sea near Margate in Kent, England, and sentenced to 15 years of prison.
- Captain Patrick Stanley Vaughan Heenan - Guilty of treason, shot on 13 February 1942, at Keppel Harbour, Singapore (extrajudicial execution).

== Soviet Union ==
- Vladimir Boyarsky - Summarily executed by partisans on 7 May 1945.
- Mikhail Bulanov - Guilty of treason and war crimes, executed on 19 December 1943.
- Sergei Bunyachenko - Guilty of treason, executed on 2 August 1946.
- Semyon Bychkov - Guilty of treason, executed on 4 November 1946.
- Herberts Cukurs - Assassinated by Mossad on 23 February 1965.
- John Demjanjuk - Guilty of war crimes, sentenced to five years in prison, died pending appeal. He had previously been sentenced to death in 1988 but his conviction was overturned on the grounds of mistaken identity as he had been confused with another Soviet collaborator, Ivan Marchenko.
- Constantine Dobrowolski - Disappeared 1944.
- Feodor Fedorenko - Guilty of war crimes, executed on 28 July 1987.
- Israfil Israfilov - Guilty of treason, executed in 1946.
- Bronislav Kaminski - Guilty of stealing the property of the Reich, executed by German military court on 28 August 1944.
- Ignaty Kladov - Guilty of treason and war crimes, executed on 18 July 1943.
- Sultan Klych-Girey - Guilty of treason, executed on 17 January 1947.
- Ivan Kotomtsev - Guilty of treason and war crimes, executed on 18 July 1943.
- Pyotr Krasnov - Guilty of treason, executed on 17 January 1947.
- Mikhail Lastovina - Guilty of treason and war crimes, executed on 18 July 1943.
- Antonina Makarova - Guilty of treason and war crimes, executed on 11 August 1979.
- Vasily Malyshkin - Guilty of treason, executed on 1 August 1946.
- Ivan Marchenko - Disappeared 1945.
- Mikhail Meandrov - Guilty of treason, executed on 1 August 1946.
- Vasyl Meleshko - Guilty of war crimes, executed in 1975.
- Grigory Misan - Guilty of treason and war crimes, executed on 18 July 1943.
- Yunus Napotsk - Guilty of treason and war crimes, executed on 18 July 1943.
- Jonas Noreika - Guilty, executed on 26 February 1947.
- Ivan Paramonov - Guilty of treason and war crimes, sentenced to 20 years penal servitude.
- Vassily Pavlov - Guilty of treason and war crimes, sentenced to 20 years penal servitude.
- Nikolai Pushkarev - Guilty of treason and war crimes, executed on 18 July 1943.
- Ivan Rechkalov - Guilty of treason and war crimes, executed on 18 July 1943.
- Konstantin Rodzaevsky - Guilty of counter-revolutionary activities, executed on 30 August 1946.
- Nikolay Shalayev - Guilty of treason, executed at an unknown date.
- Andrei Shkuro - Guilty of treason, executed on 17 January 1947.
- Vassily Tishchenko - Guilty of treason and war crimes, executed on 18 July 1943.
- Fyodor Truhin - Guilty of treason, executed on 1 August 1946.
- Grigory Tuchkov - Guilty of treason and war crimes, sentenced to 20 years penal servitude.
- Hryhoriy Vasiura - Guilty of war crimes, executed on 2 October 1987.
- Andrey Vlasov - Guilty of treason, executed on 2 August 1946.

== United Kingdom ==
- John Amery - Civilian - Guilty of treason, executed on 19 December 1945
- George Johnson Armstrong - Civilian - Guilty of treachery, executed on 10 July 1941
- Norman Baillie-Stewart - Civilian - Guilty of aiding the enemy, sentenced to five years in prison.
- Kenneth Berry - Member of Waffen-SS British Free Corps - Guilty of aiding the enemy, sentenced to nine months of hard labour.
- James Brady - Member of Waffen-SS - Guilty of aiding the enemy, sentenced to fifteen years imprisonment.
- Norah Briscoe - Civilian - Plotted to steal military intelligence for the Germans - Guilty, sentenced to five years imprisonment.
- William Brittain - Member of Waffen-SS British Free Corps - Guilty of aiding the enemy, sentenced to ten years imprisonment but released for ill health after two months.
- Harold Cole - Soldier - A con man, thief and deserter who betrayed escaped airmen and French Resistance members to the Gestapo - killed by French police in 1946.
- Thomas Haller Cooper - member of Waffen-SS - Guilty of treason, sentence of death was commuted to life imprisonment - released in 1953
- Gertrude Hiscox - Civilian - Plotted to steal military intelligence for the Germans - Guilty, sentenced to five years imprisonment.
- Raymond Davies Hughes - RAF airman - Informer at Dulag Luft POW camp and Nazi propagandist - Guilty of aiding the enemy, five-year prison sentenced reduced to two years
- Philip Jackson - Soldier - Offered to guide German bombers to targets in Britain - Guilty of treachery, sentenced to death but on appeal the sentence was commuted to life imprisonment.
- Oswald John Job - Civilian - London-born son of German parents - "may well have been an informer" within St Denis internment camp - Guilty of treachery, executed on 16 March 1944.
- William Joyce - Civilian - American-born with Irish ancestry. The Attorney General, Sir Hartley Shawcross, successfully argued that Joyce's possession of a British passport, even though he had misstated his nationality to get it, entitled him until it expired to British diplomatic protection in Germany, and therefore he owed allegiance to the King at the time he commenced working for the Germans. Guilty of treason, executed on 3 January 1946. Nicknamed "Lord Haw-Haw."
- Frank McLardy - Member of Waffen-SS British Free Corps - Guilty of aiding the enemy, sentenced to life imprisonment but released 1953.
- Alfred Minchin - Member of Waffen-SS British Free Corps - Guilty of aiding the enemy, sentenced to seven years hard labour.
- Dorothy O'Grady - Civilian - Guilty of treachery, sentenced to death but on appeal the sentence was commuted to 14 years' penal servitude.
- Eric Pleasants - Member of Waffen-SS British Free Corps - Imprisoned by Soviet Union until 1954.
- Roy Walter Purdy - Merchant Navy officer, propaganda broadcaster and informer at Colditz - guilty of treason - reports of his prosecution and trial in The Times available at "reprieved on the grounds that [he] had been [a follower] in treason rather than [a leader] ... released from prison ... in December 1954... went to live with his 'wife' and child in Germany" - died in 1982. An alternative version is that 'Instead of trying to trace his German wife Margarete and his son, Purdy married his childhood sweetheart, never revealing his childhood past to his wife. For many years he worked as a quality control inspector in an Essex car factory. He died from lung cancer in 1982. A third version is that 'Walter Purdy was released from jail in 1954. He had a child called Stephan by a woman called Margaret Weitemeir born near Ravensbruck on 5 April 1945. Purdy planned to return to her but this never happened. He married his childhood sweetheart called Muriel in 1957 but she soon died. He married another lady in about 1960 and had a son. Walter Purdy died in Southend in 1982. (Note: The National Archives holds a Foreign Office file relating to a request for assistance in obtaining travel documents to enter the Federal Republic of Germany under reference FO 371/109708, Security Service files on him under references KV 2/259 to KV 2/261, a Home Office file on him under reference HO 45/25798 and a file about his pardon under reference CRIM 1/585/141)
- Enid Riddell - Civilian - Guilty of disclosing official secrets, interned until 1943
- Theodore Schurch - Soldier - Guilty of treachery, executed on 4 January 1946
- Duncan Scott-Ford - Merchant seaman - Guilty of treachery, executed on 3 November 1942
- Irma Stapleton - Civilian - Stole experimental munitions and attempted to sell them to a German agent, who was really an MI5 agent in disguise - Guilty of aiding the enemy, sentenced to ten years imprisonment.
- Henry Alfred Symonds - Member of Waffen-SS British Free Corps - Guilty of aiding the enemy, sentenced to fifteen years imprisonment
- Leigh Vaughan-Henry - Civilian - Leader of the "Notting Hill conspiracy", a plot to stage a coup d'etat and install a fascist government in the event of Germany invading the UK - Interned under Regulation 18B for five years but never prosecuted
- Anna Wolkoff - Civilian - Russian expatriate with naturalized British citizenship - Guilty of attempting to aid the enemy, sentenced to ten years imprisonment

=== Gibraltar (UK Crown Dependency) ===
- Luis Lopez Cordon Cuenca - Civilian - Guilty of treachery and sabotage, executed on 11 January 1944 at Moorish Castle
- Jose Estelle Key - Civilian - Guilty of treachery, executed on 7 July 1942 at Wandsworth Prison, London, England
- Jose Martin Munoz - Civilian - Guilty of treachery and sabotage, executed on 11 January 1944 at Moorish Castle
- Alphons Timmerman - Civilian - Guilty of treachery, executed on 7 July 1942 at Wandsworth Prison, London, England

=== Czech Republic (British Special Operations Executive operation) ===
- Karel Čurda - Soldier - Guilty of treachery, executed on 29 April 1947. Betrayer of the Anglo-Czechoslovak army agents responsible for the assassination of top Nazi official Reinhard Heydrich in Prague.

=== British India (Crown Colony) ===
- Subhas Chandra Bose - Leader of Indian National Army - Died in plane crash on 18 August 1945.
- Gurbaksh Singh Dhillon - Member of Indian National Army - Guilty of treason, not sentenced.
- Shah Nawaz Khan - Member of Indian National Army - Guilty of treason, not sentenced.
- Prem Sahgal - Member of Indian National Army - Guilty of treason, not sentenced.

=== Occupied France (British Special Operations Executive operation) ===
- Henri Déricourt (allegedly) - Accused double agent, may have betrayed the Prosper spy network to the Germans - Not guilty, died a free man in 1962

== United States ==
- Robert Henry Best - Guilty, sentenced to life in prison. Died in prison in 1952.
- Ernest Peter Burger - Guilty, death sentence commuted to life imprisonment. Released 1948 and deported to West Germany.
- Herbert John Burgman - Guilty, died in prison in 1953.
- Douglas Chandler - Guilty, sentenced to life imprisonment, released 1963.
- William Colepaugh - Guilty, sentenced to life imprisonment, released 1960.
- Anthony Cramer - Guilty, sentenced to six years in prison after a life sentence was overturned on appeal.
- Iva Toguri D'Aquino - Guilty, sentenced to ten years' imprisonment, released 1956, pardoned 1977.
- Donald S. Day - German propagandist - Charges dropped in return for information about Soviet spies.
- Velvalee Dickinson - Guilty, sentenced to 10 years in prison. Released in 1951, and died in 1980.
- Fritz Joubert Duquesne - Guilty, sentenced to 18 years in prison. Served 14 years and died in 1956.
- Mildred Gillars - Guilty, jailed, released in 1961. Known as Axis Sally, died in 1988.
- Yoshio Harada - Native Hawaiian who assisted the Japanese - Committed suicide in 1941.
- Hans Max Haupt - Guilty, sentenced to life imprisonment, released 1957. Father of Herbert Haupt.
- Herbert Hans Haupt - Guilty, executed in 1942. Son of Hans Max Haupt.
- Tomoya Kawakita - Guilty, sentenced to death, commuted to life imprisonment, released in 1963, and deported to Japan.
- Tyler Kent - Guilty, sentenced to seven years in prison.
- Simon Emil Koedel - Guilty, sentenced to 15 years in prison.
- Marie Koedel - Guilty, sentenced to 7.5 years in prison.
- Carl Krepper - Guilty, sentenced to 12 years in prison, released 1951.
- Kurt Frederick Ludwig - Guilty, sentenced to 20 years in prison.
- Dale Maple - Guilty, served seven years in prison and was released in 1950. Died in 2001.
- Martin James Monti - Guilty and served time in prison post World War II twice 1946-1947 and from 1948 to 1960. Died in 2000.
- William Dudley Pelley - Guilty, sentenced to 15 years in prison. Indicted in another case but avoided conviction when the judge died during the trial. Paroled in 1950 and died in 1965.
- Ezra Pound - Poet and fascist propagandist - Deemed mentally unfit to stand trial. Died in 1972.
- John David Provoo - Guilty, served five years in prison before being released on a technicality. Died in 2001.
- Max Stephan - Guilty, died in prison in 1952.
- Anastasy Vonsiatsky - Guilty, sentenced to five years in prison.
