= Ilya Altman =

Russian historian

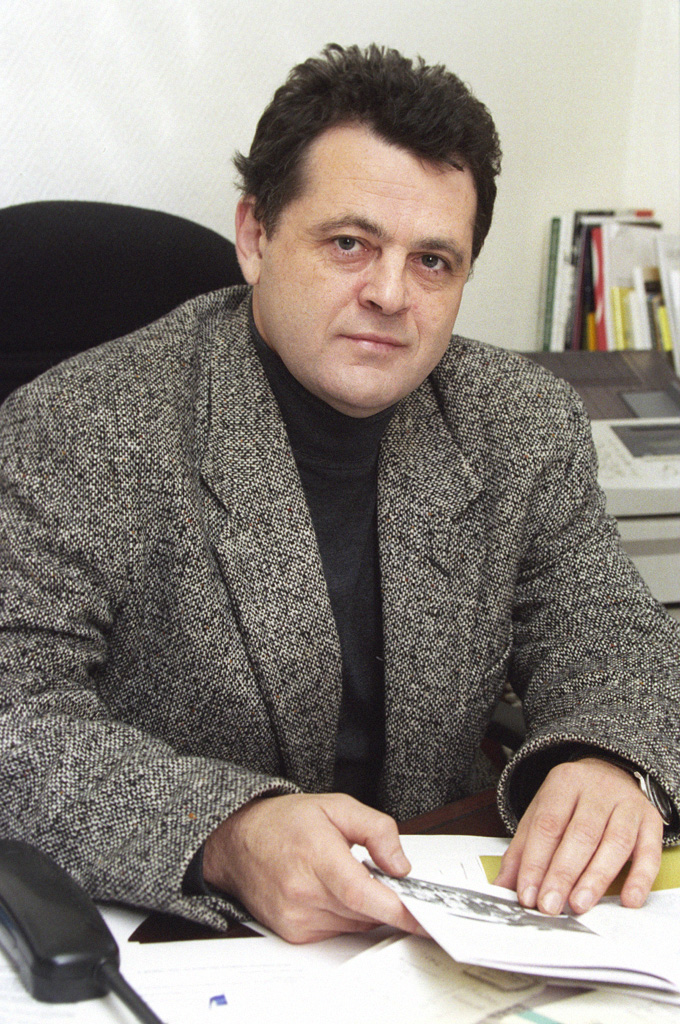
Ilya Altman in 2000

Ilya Alexandrovich Altman (Russian: Илья́ Алекса́ндрович А́льтман) (born 1955) is a Russian historian and (next to Alla Gerber) founder and co-chairman of the Russian Research and Educational Holocaust Center in Moscow. He is also author of over 300 publications on the history of the Holocaust and the Eastern Front (World War II), many of which have been published in the United States, Israel and Western Europe.

== Life and work ==
Altman is a graduate of Russian State University for the Humanities, where he worked as a lecturer between 1988 and 1993. In 1983 he received his doctorate from the Russian Academy of Sciences. Subsequently, he became deputy director of the National Archives in Vladimir and executive officer of the State Archives of the USSR. In 1992 he co-founded with Mikhail Gefter the first Holocaust research center in Russia. Ilya Altman is a frequent speaker at leading universities in the United States, France and Germany.

Ilya Altman and his colleagues at the Holocaust Center are largely responsible for introducing Holocaust curricula in Russian schools, both Jewish and non-Jewish, with the endorsement of the Russian government. He and his center also published Russian language teaching aids on the Holocaust, a volume for teachers, “History of the Holocaust in the USSR 1941-1945,” and a book for pupils, “History of the Holocaust, 1933-1945”.

Ilya Altman early emphasized the importance of training teachers for Holocaust educational programs and established a pedagogic unit for this purpose within his center. He participated actively in the seminars sponsored by the Association of Jewish Schools and Principals in the CIS, which the Memorial Foundation created after Glasnost, for its more than 40 constituent members. He also organized tens of educational seminars in the CIS with other bodies, working and receiving support from Yad Vashem, the Jewish Agency, the American Jewish Joint Distribution Committee and other groups. His foundation was also instrumental in creating a Holocaust museum in Moscow.

Furthermore, Ilya Altman is member of the International Council of the Austrian Service Abroad.

== Selected publications ==
- Victims of Hate: The Holocaust in the Soviet Union 1941-1945, Moscow, 2002 (English)
- The Unknown Black Book: The Holocaust in the German-occupied Soviet Territories; 2008 (English)
- The Holocaust in the Soviet territories; Moscow and Jerusalem 2009 (Russian)

== See also ==
- Russian Research and Educational Holocaust Center
- Holocaust research
- The Holocaust in Russia
- The Holocaust in Ukraine
- History of the Jews in the Soviet Union
- Babi Yar
