= Theme (narrative) =

Central topic, subject, or message within a narrative

In narratology, literary criticism, film studies, dramatics, and related disciplines, a theme is any major topic, subject, or message within a story. Themes are ideas that are central to a story, which can often be summed in a single abstract noun (for example, love, death, betrayal, nostalgia, or parenthood) or noun phrase (for example, coming of age, humans in conflict with technology, seeking spirituality in the modern era, or the dangers of unchecked ambition). A theme may be exemplified by the actions, utterances, or thoughts of characters, as in the theme of loneliness in John Steinbeck's Of Mice and Men, wherein many of the characters seem isolated and long for community with others. It may overlap with a thesis: a text's or creator's central argument or position regarding a theme from the story.

A story may have many themes, especially longer works, such as novels, plays, films, and television series. Themes often explore historically common or cross-culturally recognizable ideas, such as ethical questions, and are usually implied rather than stated explicitly. An example of this would be whether one should live a seemingly better life, at the price of giving up parts of one's humanity, which is a theme in Aldous Huxley's Brave New World. Along with plot, character, setting, and style, theme is considered one of the components of fiction. Themes can be divided into two categories: a work's thematic concept is what readers "think the work is about" and its thematic statement being "what the work says about the subject".

== Examples ==
Some common themes in literature are love, war, revenge, betrayal, grace, isolation, parenthood, forgiveness, loss, treachery, rich versus poor, appearance versus reality, and help from otherworldly powers.

== Techniques ==
Various techniques may be used to express literary themes.

=== Leitwortstil ===
Leitwortstil, which means "leading word style" in German, is the repetition of a wording, often with a theme, in a narrative to make sure it catches the reader's attention. An example of a leitwortstil is the recurring phrase, "So it goes", in Kurt Vonnegut's novel Slaughterhouse-Five. Its seeming message is that the world is deterministic: that things only could have happened in one way, and that the future already is predetermined. But given the anti-war tone of the story, the message perhaps is on the contrary, that things could have been different. Its use in Scheherazade's Arabian Nights demonstrates how the technique can result to the unification of the constituent members of story cycles. In the Bible, various forms of the verb "to see" also recur and underscore the idea of Abraham as a seer. There is also the repeated use of the root kbd in Samuel I, to indicate "weightiness, honor, glory".

In New Testament studies, a leitwortstil is called a verbal thread. David Rhoads, Joanna Dewey, and Donald Michie identify several verbal threads in their seminal narrative-critical study of the Gospel of Mark. For example, Mark ties together two disparate narratives with a verbal thread that forces the reader to search for connections between the narratives. The word for ripping or tearing (Greek: σχίζω, schizō) is found at the baptism of Jesus in Mark 1:10 and at the rending of the temple veil in Mark 15:38.

=== Thematic patterning ===
Thematic patterning means the insertion of a recurring motif in a narrative. For example, various scenes in John Steinbeck's Of Mice and Men are about loneliness. Thematic patterning is evident in One Thousand and One Nights, an example being the story of "The City of Brass". According to David Pinault, the overarching theme of that tale, in which a group of travelers roam the desert in search of ancient brass artifacts, is that "riches and pomp tempt one away from God". The narrative is interrupted several times by stories within the story. These include a tale recorded in an inscription found in the palace of Kush ibh Shaddad; a story told by a prisoner about Solomon; and an episode involving Queen Tadmur's corpse. According to Pinault, "each of these minor narratives introduces a character who confesses that he once proudly enjoyed worldly prosperity: subsequently, we learn, the given character has been brought low by God ... These minor tales ultimately reinforce the theme of the major narrative".

== See also ==
- Literary element
- Moral
- Motif (narrative)
