= Theodore Schurch =

British Nazi collaborator (1918–1946)

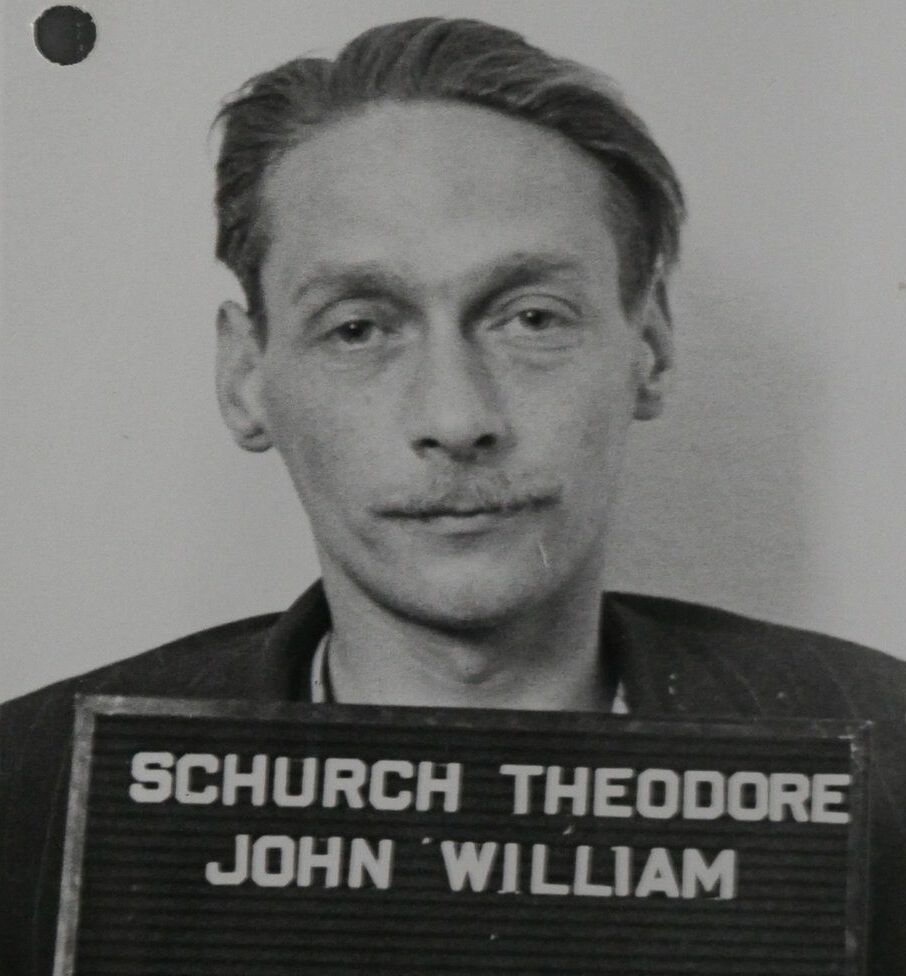
- Schurch in British custody (11 May 1945)
- Born: 5 May 1918; Hammersmith, London, England
- Died: 4 January 1946 (aged 27); Pentonville Prison, London, England
- Political party: British Union of Fascists
- Status: Executed by hanging
- Convictions: Treachery (9 counts); Desertion with intent to join the enemy
- Penalty: Death
- Military career
- Allegiance: United Kingdom; Nazi Germany; Kingdom of Italy
- Branch: British Army
- Service years: 1936–1942
- Rank: Private
- Unit: Royal Army Service Corps
- Conflicts: Second World War: North African campaign; Siege of Tobruk; Battle of Gazala (POW)

Theodore William John Schurch (5 May 1918 – 4 January 1946) was a British soldier who was executed under the Treachery Act 1940 after the end of the Second World War. He was the last person to be executed in Britain for an offence other than murder.

== Early life ==
Schurch was born in Queen Charlotte's and Chelsea Hospital, Hammersmith, London, while his Swiss father was living in Britain. He held Swiss citizenship through his parents. During his late teens, Schurch was a member of the British Union of Fascists.

In 1936, he enlisted in the British Army as a Royal Army Service Corps driver.

== Double agent ==
In June 1942, Schurch was captured by Axis forces at Tobruk during the North African campaign. Soon afterwards, he began working for both Italian and German intelligence. He often posed as a prisoner of war to gain the trust of Allied prisoners, including Lieutenant Colonel Sir David Stirling, initiator of the Special Air Service.

== Trial and execution ==
Schurch was arrested in Rome in March 1945, and charged with nine counts of treachery and one count of desertion. He was tried by court martial at the Duke of York's Headquarters in Chelsea, London, in September 1945, with Major Melford Stevenson presiding. He was defended by Alexander Brands KC. Schurch was found guilty of all counts and received the mandatory death sentence.

Schurch was hanged on 4 January 1946 at HM Prison Pentonville, at the age of 27. His execution was carried out by Albert Pierrepoint, who had hanged William Joyce the previous day for high treason.

Schurch was the only British soldier executed for treachery committed during the war. However, Duncan Scott-Ford, a merchant seaman, and civilians George Johnson Armstrong and Oswald John Job were also hanged for treachery, and New Zealand-born Captain Patrick Stanley Vaughan Heenan of the British Indian Army was convicted of espionage, and shot by a guard. Harold Cole, a British POW and petty criminal who betrayed members of the French Resistance, was shot in a gun battle with French police in January 1946, a month after he escaped from custody.
