= George Johnson Armstrong =

British engineer and convicted traitor

George Johnson Armstrong (1902 – 9 July 1941) was the first British citizen to be executed under the Treachery Act 1940. Only four other British subjects are known to have been executed under this Act; saboteur Jose Estelle Key (a Gibraltarian), Duncan Scott-Ford, Oswald John Job (born in London to German parents) and Theodore Schurch. Armstrong was a member of the Communist Party of Great Britain.

Armstrong was an engineer by occupation. In 1940, he was arrested in Boston, Massachusetts, after being implicated in a Nazi spy ring. He was then deported to England. After returning, Armstrong was re-arrested and charged with treachery. He was tried on 8 May 1941 at the Central Criminal Court (the Old Bailey in London) and convicted for communicating with the German Consul in Boston to offer him assistance before the United States entered the Second World War. He was sentenced to death by Mr Justice Lewis.

His appeal on 23 June 1941, at the Court of Criminal Appeal, was dismissed, and on 10 July 1941, Armstrong was executed by hanging at HM Prison Wandsworth by Thomas Pierrepoint.
