= Karel Richard Richter =

German Second World War spy

- Richter after his arrest (1940)
- Born: 29 January 1912; Graslitz, Austria-Hungary
- Died: 10 December 1941 (aged 29); Wandsworth Prison, London, England
- Cause of death: Execution by hanging
- Burial place: Wandsworth Prison Cemetery
- Occupation: Merchant Seaman
- Parent(s): Richard Richter and Marie Burgert
- Espionage activity
- Allegiance: Germany
- Service years: 1940-1941
- Codename: ROBOTER

Karel Richard Richter (29 January 1912 – 10 December 1941) was a German spy. Richter was captured on 14 May 1941 after parachuting into the United Kingdom during the Second World War. He was convicted of espionage at the Old Bailey on 24 October 1941, sentenced to death and hanged on 10 December 1941 at Wandsworth Prison.

== Early life ==
Richter was a Czechoslovak citizen born in 1912 in Kraslice (that time known as Graslitz) in Bohemia, Austria-Hungary. His parents were Richard Richter, a metal worker, and Marie Burgert. Richter had one sister, Gertrude, who later married a Totzauer and one brother, František.

From 1918 to 1923, Richter attended the State School in Kraslice. When he was 11 years old, Richter attended the Staats-Oberreal-Gymnasium in the city of Most. Richter graduated in 1927 at the age of 16 years and spent the next two years working as an apprentice at the Citroën car workshop in Karlovy Vary. Upon completion of his apprenticeship, around 1930, Richter returned home and worked in his father's metal-work business. In 1932, with support from his father, Richter started a car-rental business, but by 1934 the business had failed. Unemployed for six months, Richter sought to join the Czechoslovak Army but was rejected three times on medical grounds. In 1935, Richter wrote to the American Consul in Prague, seeking an American visa, but was told he would have to wait two years.

== Life as a sailor ==
In 1935, Richter travelled to Hamburg and shipped aboard the Cassel bound for Java. Richter worked as a machinist in the engine room and this particular voyage lasted one year. In the autumn of 1936, Richter returned to Hamburg on the Cassel. In Hamburg, Richter joined the New York, which travelled between Hamburg and New York, with each round trip taking about 27 days. Richter was employed as a machinist in the engine room and made the round trip thirteen times that year. In 1937, Richter joined the Hamburg, which also plied the Hamburg-New York route, and spent one year on board. In 1939, Richter joined the Hansa, which also travelled between Hamburg and New York. During the summer of 1939, the Hansa returned to Hamburg and, with war looming, Richter was paid off (or deserted) and returned to his home in Kraslice.

Richter wanted to return to America where he had a girlfriend, Gertrude Wegmann, and a young son. In October and November 1939, Richter travelled across Poland and Lithuania to Sweden where he was arrested by the Swedish police as his papers were not in order. Richter was imprisoned at the Långmora Camp in Sweden for eight months before being deported to Sassnitz in July 1940. Richter was arrested by the Gestapo and imprisoned in Fuhlsbüttel Concentration Camp near Hamburg.

== Life as a spy ==
In November 1940, Richter was recruited by the Abwehr as a spy. During his training in Hamburg and the Hague, Richter met another spy, Josef Jakobs, who was sent to Britain on 31 January 1941. Unlike Jakobs, who was to report on the weather in Britain, Richter had a very specific mission, to check on Wulf Schmidt, a German spy working in Britain. The Germans suspected that Schmidt (known as Agent LEONHARD) had been turned into a double-agent by the British, which in fact he had, being known to the British as agent TATE.

Richter parachuted into Britain on the early morning of 12 May 1941, landing near London Colney, north of London. Richter quickly hid his parachute and equipment and spent the next few days and nights hiding in a forest, too nervous to travel to London. When Richter eventually came out of hiding, he was approached by a lorry driver who asked Richter for directions. Unable to give directions, Richter aroused the suspicions of the lorry driver who drove a short distance and reported the strange foreigner to a police officer. The police officer found Richter and, after examining his papers and asking him a few questions, decided to take Richter to the local police station. Richter's identity papers, in the name of Fred Snyder, were clearly forged and did not match the expired Czechoslovak passport in his possession (which was in his own name). Richter was sent to Camp 020 where he was interrogated by officers of MI5. Richter was a difficult agent to break and it was only when he was confronted with Jakobs that Richter began to crack. Richter revealed the true purpose of his mission, to check up on Schmidt.

== Trial and execution ==
Richter was charged with espionage under the Treachery Act 1940. He was tried in camera at the Old Bailey and found guilty on 24 October 1941. He was sentenced to death by hanging. Richter filed an appeal which was, after much discussion in the Security Service, rejected. Faced with his imminent execution, Richter wrote a letter to one of the MI5 officers: "You can rely upon it that I shall not be less brave than Jakobs; I too will know how to die, yet not as a Nazi spy on your gallows, but as a man."

On 10 December 1941, Richter was hanged at Wandsworth Prison. A procedure that normally took around 15 seconds, took over 17 minutes. When Albert Pierrepoint, the executioner, entered Richter's cell to bind his wrists, Richter charged at the cell wall headfirst. After a struggle, Pierrepoint succeeded in binding Richter's wrists behind his back with a leather strap, but Richter's ferocious strength was so great that he split the leather strap and was free again. Four warders eventually subdued Richter and bundled him into the gallows chamber where a strap was fastened around his ankles, a hood placed over his head and the noose placed around his neck. Richter continued to fight and just as Pierrepoint pulled the lever that would open the trapdoors beneath Richter's feet, the condemned man jumped in the air. The noose slipped and almost came off Richter's head but caught under his nose. Richter had died instantly.

== Other sources ==
- Hayward, James (2013). Double Agent Snow: The True Story of Arthur Owens, Hitler's Chief Spy in England. London: Simon & Schuster UK Ltd. ISBN 978-0-85720-854-5.
- Levine, Joshua (2011). Operation Fortitude: The Story of the Spy Operation that Saved D-Day. London: HarperCollins Publishers. ISBN 978-0-00-731353-2.
- West, Nigel (1981). MI5 - the True Story of the Most Secret Counterespionage Organization in the World. Briarcliff Manor, N.Y.: Stein and Day. ISBN 0-8128-2859-3.
- National Archives, Security Service Files KV2/30 and KV 2/31, RICHTER: Karel. German. Agent of the German Intelligence Service in the Second World War. Executed. Case papers.
