= Alphons Timmerman =

Belgian spy for Nazi Germany (1904–1942)

- Born: 1904; Ostend, Belgium
- Died: 7 July 1942 (aged 37–38); Wandsworth Prison, London, England
- Cause of death: Execution by hanging
- Occupation: Ship's steward
- Espionage activity
- Allegiance: Germany
- Service years: 1941
- Codename: Scruffy

Alphons Louis Eugene Timmerman (1904 – 7 July 1942) (assigned the codename Scruffy by the British) was a Belgian ship's steward who became a spy for the German intelligence agency, the Abwehr, during the Second World War. He was captured by the security services upon his arrival in Britain in September 1941. MI5 officers posed as Timmerman in correspondence with the Abwehr in an attempt to deceive them as to the competence of the British security services. This attempt was unsuccessful as German intelligence officers failed to spot deliberate mistakes in the letters, but did help to disprove the Abwehr's previously good reputation for intelligence work. Timmerman admitted to being a spy and was executed at Wandsworth Prison in 1942.

== Early life and detection ==
Alphons Louis Eugene Timmerman was born in Ostend, Belgium in 1904. He became a ship's steward and in that role visited many British ports in the inter-war years and developed a good knowledge of the English language. He never married.

After the start of the Second World War Timmerman arrived at Gibraltar claiming to have escaped Nazi persecution in Belgium. He made his way to Scotland, arriving at Rothesay Dock in Glasgow on 1 September 1941 where he claimed asylum as a refugee. Timmerman was taken to the Royal Victoria Patriotic School which was run as a "reception centre" by the British security services to interview newly arrived foreign nationals.

The British security services had been warned via an Ultra decryption of a coded German message that a Belgian seaman was en route to the UK as a spy to make detailed reports on allied shipping. Suspicions were raised by the address Timmerman provided for wages to be remitted to (which was his mother's). He was also found to be carrying a recipe for the manufacture of invisible ink and an envelope containing crystals which, upon being added to water, would make the substance. Upon being confronted with this Timmerman admitted to being a spy and was arrested. He was the first German agent arrested at the Royal Victoria Patriotic School facility.

== MI5 deception and execution ==
Timmerman was codenamed "Scruffy" by MI5 and incarcerated at HM Prison Wandsworth in London. MI5 took advantage of Timmerman's arrest to attempt to deceive the German intelligence service Abwehr as to the abilities of MI5. British intelligence officers wrote messages to Timmerman's Abwehr handlers via a cover address in Lisbon. The messages contained deliberate errors which MI5 hoped would be easily detected by the Abwehr and project an image of MI5 as an amateur and incompetent organisation. However, the Abwehr failed to notice or else ignored the errors and continued to communicate with "Timmerman". The British deduced from this that the Abwehr did not deserve its reputation as a sophisticated and ruthless service and ended the communications.

MI5 had no further use for Timmerman and to prove to the Abwehr that he had never been at liberty to communicate with them he was sent for trial at the Old Bailey. Timmerman was tried in camera by Mr Justice Humphreys on 20 May 1942 in what was later described as a "rapid, secret" hearing. He was found guilty of treachery and executed at Wandsworth Prison on 7 July 1942 by hanging. The execution was carried out the same day as that of José Estelle Key, a British citizen and Gibraltar resident convicted of spying for Germany and the pair were two of 16 spies executed by Britain during the war. The executions of Key and Timmerman were carried out by Albert Pierrepoint, assisted by Harry Kirk, Henry William Critchell and Stephen Wade. Timmerman, a slight man, required a drop of 9 feet (2.7 m), longer than usual, to ensure his neck was broken by the fall.
