= The Holocaust in Russia =

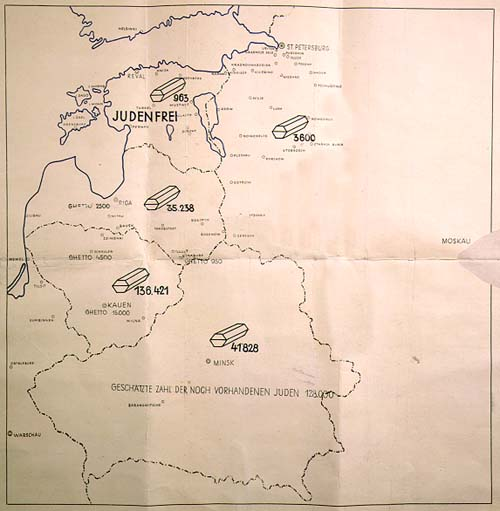
January 1942 German map titled "Jewish Executions Carried Out by Einsatzgruppe A". Number of Jews murdered in the Russian SFSR is shown as 3600. Map reads at the bottom: "estimated number of Jews still on hand is 128,000".

The Holocaust in Russia, a part of The Holocaust in the Soviet Union as well as a part of The Holocaust which was perpetrated throughout German-occupied Europe by Nazi Germany, was a genocide which was committed against Russian Jews during the occupation of Soviet Russia by Nazi Germany.

== World War II ==
On 22 June 1941, Adolf Hitler abruptly broke the Molotov–Ribbentrop Pact and invaded the Soviet Union. The Soviet territories which were occupied by Nazi Germany by early 1942, including all of Belarus, Estonia, Latvia, Lithuania, Moldova, Ukraine and most Russian territory which was located west of the Leningrad–Moscow–Rostov line, was inhabited by about four million Jews, including hundreds of thousands of Jews who had fled from Poland in 1939. Despite the chaotic nature of the Soviet retreat, the Soviet government attempted to evacuate Jews, some Jews were employed in the military industries, other Jews were the relatives of servicemen. Of the 4 million Jews who lived in Russia, about a million of them succeeded in escaping and moving further to the east. The "Holocaust by bullets" was the task of the Einsatzgruppen, the SS death squads which were under the overall command of Reinhard Heydrich. These death squads had previously been deployed on a limited scale in Poland in 1939, but now, they were deployed on a much larger scale. Most of their victims were defenseless Jewish civilians (not a single Einsatzgruppe member was killed in action during these operations). They used their skills to become efficient killers, according to Michael Berenbaum. By the end of 1941, however, the Einsatzgruppen had killed only 15 percent of the Jews in the occupied Soviet territories, and it was apparent that these methods could not be used to kill all the Jews of Europe. Even before the invasion of the Soviet Union, experiments with killing Jews in the back of vans using gas from the van's exhaust had been carried out, and when this proved too slow, more lethal gasses were tried. Units of the Wehrmacht also participated in many aspects of the Holocaust in Russia.

== The Holocaust in the RSFSR ==
The Black Book of Soviet Jewry contains a section on occupied Russia, with testimonies about the Holocaust in Smolensk, Rostov-on-Don, Yessentuki, Kislovodsk and Stavropol among others.

It is estimated by some that before the war, 130,000 Jews lived in parts of the RSFSR that would be later be occupied. The majority evacuated eastward, and a report written by Einsatzgruppen mentions the massive flight. Most of the Jews who remained in occupied RSFSR territories with the advance of the Wehrmacht were murdered by the beginning of 1942, except for some in the southern areas who were murdered between spring 1942 and winter 1942–1943.

The YIVO encyclopedia places the number of Holocaust victims in the Russian Soviet Federated Socialist Republic at over 119,000. This is because while much of the local Jewish population escaped, many refugees from places further west fled to these areas, only for them to be captured later. According to this source, most Holocaust victims in the RSFSR were murdered in the areas of Rostov-on-Don, Krasnodar, Smolensk and Bryansk. Yitzhak Arad gives a grand total of 55,000 to 70,000 total Jews in the Russian SFSR murdered in the Holocaust, though it's unclear if he uses the Russian SFSR's 1938 borders (with Crimea) or 1958 borders (without Crimea) in this calculation.

== Aftermath ==
The Nazi genocide of the Jews, carried out by German Einsatzgruppen and the Wehrmacht alongside local collaborators, resulted in the almost complete annihilation of the Jewish population over the entire territory controlled by Germany and its allies during the Second World War. During World War II, Léon Poliakov established the Center of Contemporary Jewish Documentation (1943) and after the war, he assisted Edgar Faure at the Nuremberg Trial.

In July 1943, a Soviet military court in Krasnodar held the first war crimes trial of World War II. There were 11 defendants, all of whom were collaborators. They were each charged with treason for helping the Germans murder 7000 people during the occupation of Krasnodar. All but one of the defendants were members of the death squad Sonderkommando 10a, a subunit of Einsatzgruppe D.

All of the defendants pleaded guilty and begged for leniency. Eight of them were sentenced to death and publicly hanged on 18 July 1943, the day after sentencing. The other three were deemed to have had relatively minor roles and were instead each sentenced to 20 years of hard labour. While outside observers viewed the proceedings as a show trial, they did not doubt the severity or the extent of the crimes themselves, nor did they doubt the guilt of the defendants. Observers said that the true purpose of the trial was to showcase the suffering of Soviet civilians and deter further collaboration.

== Massacres ==
- Gully of Petrushino, near Taganrog, October 1941

== After World War II ==
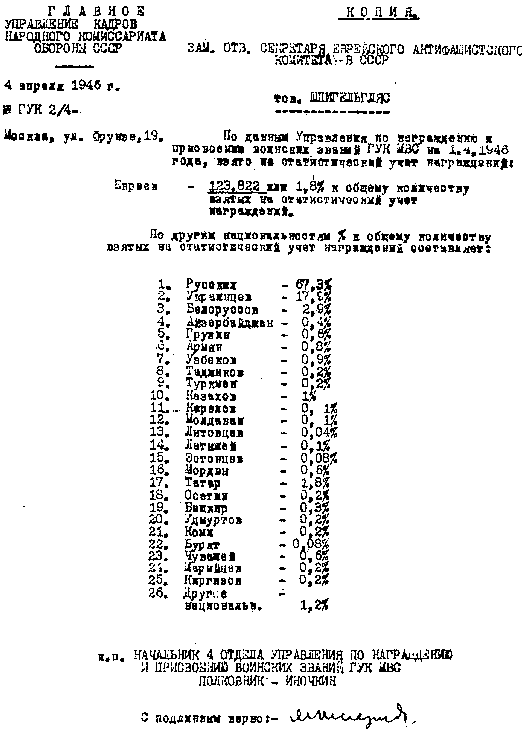
The official response to the 1946 inquiry by the Jewish Anti-Fascist Committee about the military decorations of Jews during the war (1.8% of the total number). Some antisemites accused Jews of lack of patriotism and of hiding from military service.

Following the war, the Soviet Union suppressed or downplayed the impact of Nazi crimes on its Jewish citizens. An antisemitic campaign against "rootless cosmopolitans" (i.e. "Zionists") followed. On 12 August 1952, in the event known as the Night of the Murdered Poets, thirteen most prominent Yiddish writers, poets, actors and other intellectuals were executed on the orders of Joseph Stalin, among them Peretz Markish, Leib Kvitko, David Hofstein, Itzik Feffer and David Bergelson.

== Research ==
The United States Holocaust Memorial Museum's Mandel Center's Initiative on the Holocaust in the Soviet Union works to gain a better understanding of this developing subfield and unearth the crimes and casualties. The Mandel Center partnered with various international organizations such as the International Centre for History and Sociology of World War II and its Consequences at the National Research University Higher School of Economics, The Yiddish Language Institute, the Center for Judaic Studies at the University of Latvia, the Museum “Jews in Latvia", Taras Shevchenko National University of Kyiv, the Ukrainian Center for Holocaust Studies, and the National University of Kyiv-Mohyla Academy.

== See also ==
- Consequences of Nazism
- Drang nach Osten
- Eastern Front (World War II)
- Final Solution
- Generalplan Ost
- History of the Jews during World War II
- Hunger Plan
- Krasnodar Trial — the 1943 war crimes trial in the Russian SSR
- New Order (Nazism)
- Russian Research and Educational Holocaust Center
- Soviet Union in World War II
- The Holocaust in the Soviet Union
- Victims of Nazi Germany
- War crimes in World War II
- War crimes of the Wehrmacht
