= Russian Research and Educational Holocaust Center =

The Russian Research and Educational Holocaust Center was founded in 1992 in Moscow and has since then been working on awareness raising of the Holocaust in the Russian society. It is the only non-governmental organization in the Russian Federation, devoted to the study of the life of Soviet Jews during the Great Patriotic War.

== Responsibilities and activities ==
The main tasks of the Center comprise historical research, conducting memorial services, the incorporation of the Holocaust topic into the curricula of secondary schools and universities, promoting the formation of opinions as well as interviews with contemporary witnesses. The Center, furthermore, organizes regular exhibitions.

The Holocaust Center addressed itself to inform the Russian public about the genocide of Jews. The foundation of this goal is the specialist library, where a large number of publications relating to the Holocaust in the former USSR are available. Besides, the library includes a video collection and an archive for the preservation of the personal belongings of former ghetto prisoners, participants in the Great Patriotic War and members of the Resistance. It also offers its own seminar room with a permanent documentary exhibition. Furthermore, temporary exhibitions are also held from time to time.

The most important target group for the Centers educational programs are teachers. New projects are constantly being developed and implemented in order to enable teachers to participate in specific courses and pass their newly gained knowledge to their students. This initiative intends to counteract anti-Semitism and to raise awareness for the events of the past through education.

Meetings of the discussion group "Unknown Holocaust", the Youth Center and the Association of the Righteous Among the Nations are held at the Center on a monthly basis. Leading world experts regularly give lectures and hold presentations such as Professor Michael Berenbaum, one of the founders of the United States Holocaust Memorial Museum, the former director of the Yad Vashem Museum Izhak Arad, Paul Levin and Stephane Bruhfeld (Sweden), the authors of the book Tell Your Children About It, and Shimon Samuels, director of the European Bureau of the Simon Wiesenthal Center. Every year, the Center organizes evening ceremonies commemorating the victims of the Holocaust and the heroes of the Resistance. Government leaders also participate in these events, which evokes a strong response from the society and the media.

== Direction ==
The Center is under the direction of Alla Gerber, a writer and journalist and former member of the State Duma, who is currently president of the foundation and co-chairman of the center, and co-chairman Ilya Altman, who is a well-known historian and archivist. Henri Reznik, a famous Russian lawyer, is chairman of the board, which includes other personalities form the fields of economy, science, culture and politics.

== International cooperations ==
The network of foreign partners constitutes a key element for the work of the Holocaust Center, especially as a research and educational institution. The Center works in close cooperation with several foreign organizations:

Apart from an intensive collaboration with Yad Vashem, which allowed the realization of several seminars and educational programs, the Center cooperates with the Simon Wiesenthal Center. Hereby the publication of the book "Antisemitism: The Generic Hatred" was realized. Additionally, the Center has close ties with the United States Holocaust Memorial Museum, Washington D.C., where Russian teachers annually take part in educational seminars. Other important partners are the Anne Frank Foundation and the University of Gothenburg (Sweden). Moreover, the Center participates in important international conferences such as the Stockholm Forum. Many of its partner institutions are based in German speaking countries, such as the House of the Wannsee Conference, where seminars with Russian and Belarusian teachers regularly take place. Another achievement is the book "Victims of Hate" by Ilya Altman which is the result of the successful cooperation with Hamburg Institute for Social Sciences. Apart from the close ties with different museums, such as the Jewish Museum Berlin, the German-Russian Museum Berlin-Karlshorst and the Jewish Museum Frankfurt (where seminars for teachers are regularly conducted), the Holocaust Center cooperates with the Ruprecht-Karls-University Heidelberg. For many years the Center has successfully been working together with Germany-based Action Reconciliation Service for Peace. Within the framework of this cooperation, every year one young volunteer from ARSP works in the Center in Moscow. Since the late nineties, also young Austrians fulfill their compulsory paid community service in the Center. This was, at first, a cooperation with "Verein GEDENKDIENST", but since 2010, the cooperation only involves volunteers of the Austrian Service Abroad. All three organizations pursue the goal of preserving the memory of the victims of National socialism also among the younger generations. Moreover, the Holocaust Center is supported by numerous German, English, Israeli and other international foundations.

== See also ==
- Holocaust research
- The Holocaust in Russia
- The Holocaust in Ukraine
- History of the Jews in the Soviet Union
- Babi Yar
