= Duncan Scott-Ford =

British sailor executed for treachery (1921–1942)

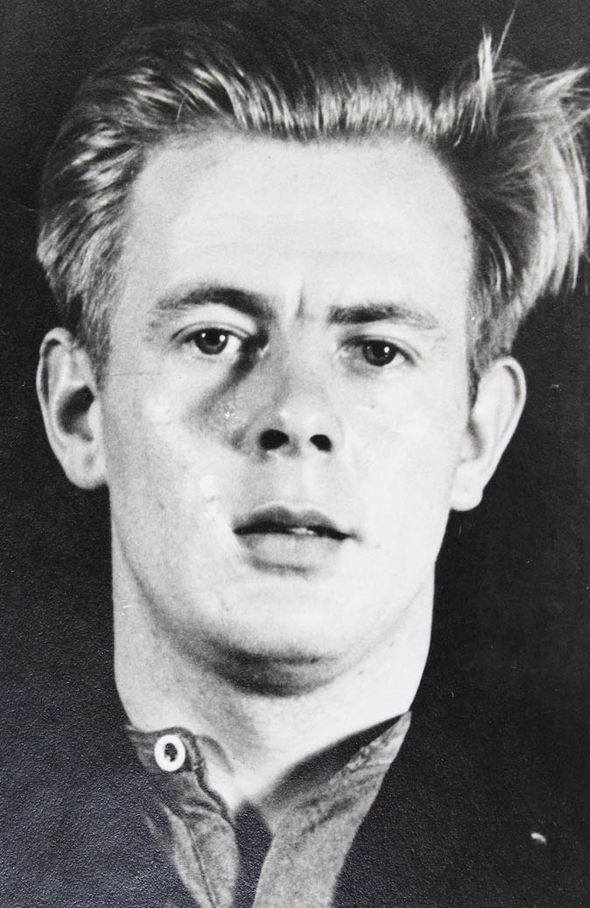
- Scott-Ford after his arrest
- Born: Duncan Alexander Croall Smith; 4 September 1921; Plymouth, Devon, England
- Died: 3 November 1942 (aged 21); Wandsworth Prison, England
- Resting place: Wandsworth Prison Cemetery
- Occupation: Sailor
- Status: Executed by hanging
- Convictions: Treachery; Dishonesty
- Penalty: Death

Duncan Alexander Croall Scott-Ford (4 September 1921 – 3 November 1942) was a British merchant seaman who was hanged for treachery after giving information to an enemy agent during the Second World War.

== Early life ==
Scott-Ford was born in Plymouth, Devon, with the name Duncan Alexander Croall Smith. He was the son of Duncan Scott Smith who worked as a sick berth orderly in the Royal Navy. His father died on 23 March 1933 after catching pneumonia from the effects of taking an overdose of morphine in a suicide attempt, and Smith changed his surname to Scott-Ford in an attempt to improve his social status. He was educated at the Royal Hospital School in Holbrook from 1933 to 1937, and then on turning 16 enlisted in the Royal Navy and joined the shore establishment HMS Impregnable in Devonport in December 1937.

== Service career ==
=== Royal Navy ===
In June 1939 Scott-Ford was serving on the light cruiser HMS Gloucester when she called at Dar-es-Salaam in the Tanganyika Territory on a goodwill visit. He met and became infatuated with a German girl; the Security Service (MI5) later came to believe that he may have given her secret naval codes. Later in 1940 his ship was stationed in Egypt, and Scott-Ford became obsessed with a prostitute whom he often visited. He was discovered to have altered the book of his Post Office Savings Bank account and sent to a court martial, which convicted him. He was sentenced to two years' imprisonment and dismissed from the service with ignominy but, after a successful appeal by his mother, the sentence was remitted to six months' imprisonment and an honourable discharge.

=== Merchant Navy ===
Repatriated to the United Kingdom to serve his sentence, Scott-Ford was released in July 1941 and stayed briefly with his mother. They quarreled over his mother's use of the allowance from his Royal Navy pay which he sent home, with Scott-Ford accusing his mother of using it to buy a fur coat. Shortly afterwards he joined the Merchant Navy. He was on board the merchant ship SS Finland when she arrived in Lisbon, Portugal, on 10 May 1942.

== Espionage ==
Soon after Scott-Ford arrived in Lisbon, a man who told him that his name was Rithman met him in a bar. Rithman said that he could get a letter to the girl Scott-Ford had known in Dar-es-Salaam. Rithman offered Scott-Ford 1,000 Portuguese escudos if he would confirm the rumour that all British ships had been ordered to be in port on 28 June 1942. Scott-Ford undertook to try to find out and to meet again the following day. Although unable to find confirmation, Scott-Ford met with Rithman and a man who called himself Captain Henley and appeared to be Rithman's superior. Scott-Ford confessed to not having found the information Rithman wanted, but the group nevertheless discussed issues such as the state of morale in the United Kingdom, the extent of air raid damage there, and public opinion of Prime Minister Winston Churchill. Henley gave him a 1,000 escudo note and arranged another meeting a few days later.

At this meeting, Scott-Ford was driven around in a car to disorient him and then taken to a room where he was asked to obtain more information about the location of British minefields, the arrival of American military personnel in the United Kingdom, and up-to-date copies of Jane's Fighting Ships and Jane's All the World's Aircraft. Henley asked Scott-Ford to sign a receipt for the 1,000 escudos, which Scott-Ford did, using his real name. His ship departed Lisbon the next day; all the crew were interrogated on arrival at Liverpool to ask if they had been approached by German agents. Scott-Ford stated that he had been approached but had not cooperated.

=== Blackmail ===
Finland sailed for Lisbon again in July 1942, arriving on 26 July. Scott-Ford again met up with the Germans, receiving another 500 escudos for expenses (again signing a receipt) although he had been unable to get the books which they had requested. The Germans threatened to give the receipts to the British Embassy. Scott-Ford did give details of the convoy he had sailed in and its protection, the location of an aircraft factory, and the training of troops for an invasion of Europe. At the end of the meeting, he was told to keep a record of the movement and speed of the convoy and given another 100 escudos. Another meeting was arranged, but Scott-Ford was unable to keep it as Finland departed for Manchester.

=== Confession ===
On arriving at Salford Docks on 18 August 1942, Scott-Ford was again routinely asked about approach attempts from German intelligence, and this time described a man who had asked him about communism in the United Kingdom. The authorities already had word from Lisbon that an agent codenamed 'RUTHERFORD' by the Germans had been talking and therefore arranged to see him again the next day. Scott-Ford admitted that he had received 1,600 escudos (about £18 in 1942, or £733 in 2025) for information. He was taken into custody and sent to the 'London Reception Centre', where refugees were routinely screened for German agents. The notes which Scott-Ford had made about the convoy were found in a search of his quarters on Finland.

== Trial and execution ==
In order to keep Scott-Ford in custody, an order was issued under Defence Regulation 18B for him to be detained. He was sent to Camp 020, an interrogation centre based at Latchmere House on Ham Common in southwest London where he complied with the authorities, although he became increasingly alarmed as he began to understand the seriousness of his situation. Professor A. W. B. Simpson, a historian of detention without trial, has speculated that Scott-Ford was offered his life in return for additional information on the Germans' intelligence system, but had no more to give.

Scott-Ford was charged under the Treachery Act 1940, and after an in camera trial before Mr Justice William Norman Birkett, was convicted on 16 October 1942. The only sentence on conviction under the Treachery Act 1940 was death; it was the first occasion on which Birkett had found himself pronouncing a death sentence. Interviewed in 1959 by John Freeman on the television series Face to Face, Birkett said that he "had always rather dreaded it, but when the actual moment came, I did it without the slightest trace of emotion".

Camp 020 were asked for their recommendation on whether Scott-Ford should be reprieved. The commandant wrote that there were no reasons for a reprieve: "Indeed, there may well be many who will agree that death by hanging is almost too good for a sailor who will encompass the death of thousands of his shipmates without qualm." Scott-Ford was hanged by Albert Pierrepoint at 9:00 am local time on 3 November 1942 at Wandsworth Prison in London.

The details of his trial were kept secret until Scott-Ford was dead. The next day's papers reported that he had betrayed his country for £18, and died in consequence, as a warning to other Merchant Navy sailors who might have been approached.
