= Simon Emil Koedel =

Spy for Nazi Germany in World War II

- Born: Simon Emil Koedel; 1881; Würzburg, Bavaria, Germany
- Died: 1949
- Espionage activity
- Allegiance: United States; German Empire; Germany
- Service years: 1912-1918, 1930s-1944
- Codename: Agent A2011

Simon Emil Koedel (1881–1949) was a spy for Nazi Germany in World War II. Born in 1881 in Würzburg, Bavaria, Germany, and came to the US in 1904. Koedel enlisted in the US Army in 1908 and served until 1911, and in 1912 he became a US citizen. He began spying on American shipping for Germany, and in April 1915 headed for England via Holland. He spied on shipping in England and Scotland until he was arrested in Liverpool. After being deported back to the US, he headed to Germany in 1916 again via Holland. Koedel was then commissioned as a captain in the Germany Army and subsequently returned to the United States.

During World War II, Koedel used his stepdaughter, Marie Koedel, to spy on US and other seamen while in port in New York. He monitored American ports and US military suppliers. He obtained and forwarded to Germany volumes of information about US companies involved in the war effort over many years, but also about policy, decisions made and to come; information which he obtained by posing as a concerned citizen. He often wrote to Congressmen and other highly regarded persons who unwittingly helped him through otherwise closed doors.

The Koedels were both arrested in 1944. They were charged with conspiracy to commit espionage. In 1945, Simon pleaded guilty, while Marie was convicted at trial. During her trial, Marie, who claimed she acted under duress and her mother had said Simon had physically abused the two of them. Simon was sentenced to 15 years in prison, while Marie was sentenced to 7.5 years in prison. Both avoided possible death sentences since their known spying activities happened before the United States entered the war.
