= Alla Gerber =

Russian politician and journalist

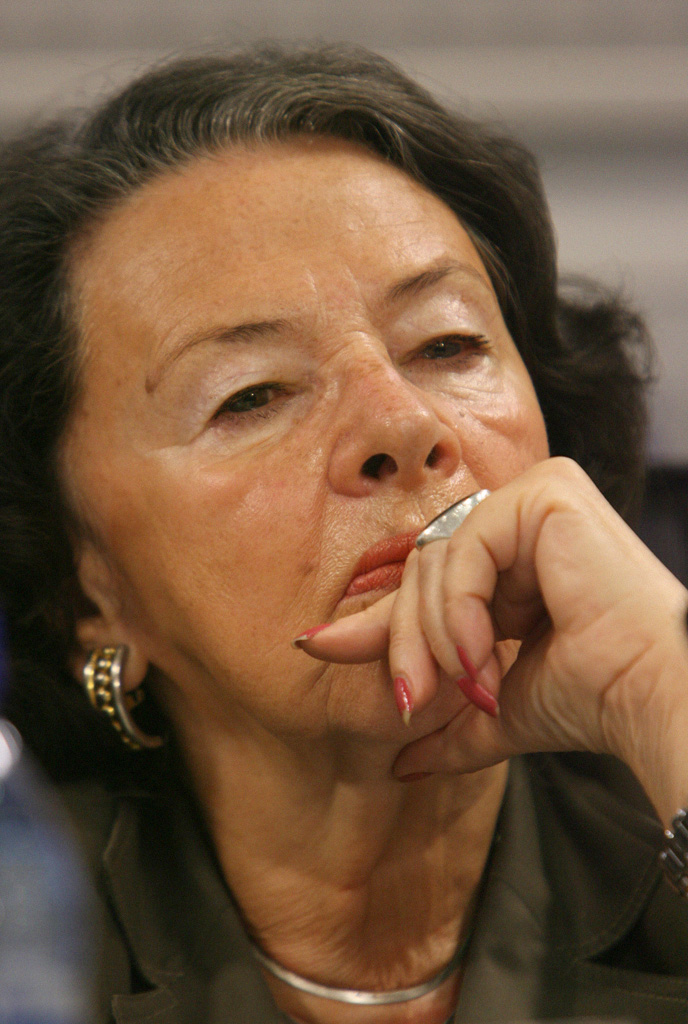
Alla Gerber

Alla Yefremovna Gerber (Russian: А́лла Ефре́мовна Ге́рбер, born 3 January 1932 in Moscow) is a Russian politician, journalist and film critic.

== Life ==
In 1955, Alla Gerber graduated from the faculty of law of the Moscow State University. In the following years she worked as a lawyer and a journalist. First, she worked for Moskovskij Komsomolets and was a correspondent of the literary magazine Yunost and the newspapers Izvestia, Literaturnaya Gazeta and Moskovskaya Pravda. Since 1963 she has written over 1000 articles and 8 books. She is also a member of the Russian Union of Journalists and former member of the USSR Union of Writers.

=== Political commitment ===
- 1989: Co-organizer of the pro-perestroika-writer movement "Aprel" ("Апрель")
- 1990: First anti-fascist process in the USSR, with the conviction of a functionary of the ultra-nationalist organization Pamyat "(Russian for "memory") ended
- 1991: leading member of the movement "Democratic Russia" and founder of the Moscow Anti-Fascist Centre
- 1993: Members of the first State Duma of the Russian Federation in the group “Russia’s choice” ("Выбор России")
- Since 1995: Research fellow of the Institute for the Economy in Transition ("Института экономики переходного периода"), president of the Holocaust Foundation, member of the editorial board of the library "Holocaust" and, among others co-author of "The history of the Holocaust on Soviet territory"
- Since 2007: Member of the Public Chamber of Russia

In the Duma she dealt, among others, with laws in the following areas:

- limiting the privileges of the deputies and state officials
- Governmental and Non-State secondary education
- banning of extremist organizations, hate mongering and National Socialist symbols
- Protection of Museums and Libraries

=== Awards and honors ===
- Laureate of the Prize "Person of the Year 5762" of the Federation of Jewish Communities of Russia

== See also ==
- Russian Research and Educational Holocaust Center
