= The Holocaust in the Soviet Union =

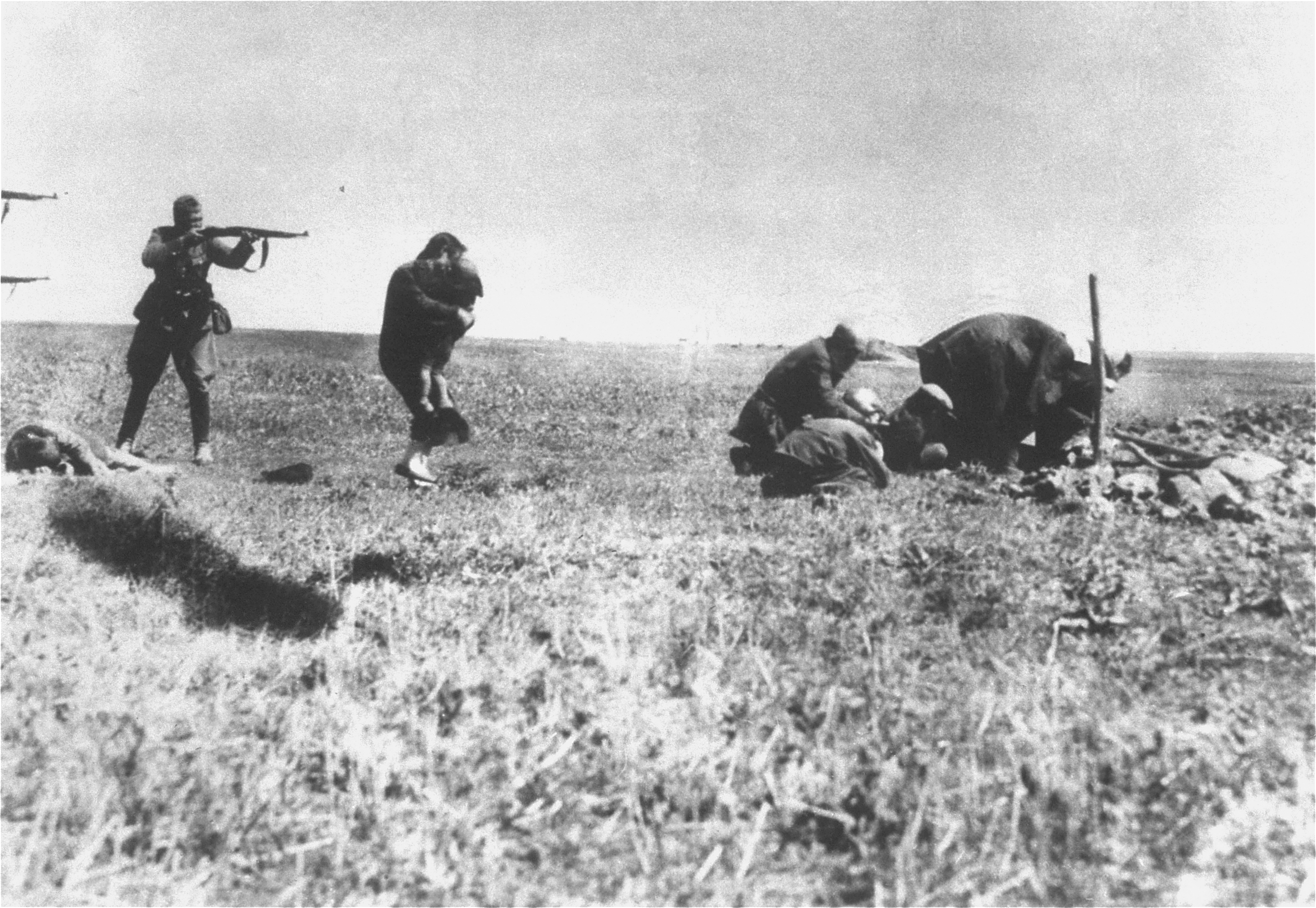
Einsatzgruppen murdering Jews in Soviet Ukraine, 1942

The Holocaust saw the genocide of at least 2 million Soviet Jews by Nazi Germany, Romania, and local collaborators during the German-Soviet War, part of the wider Second World War. It may also refer to the Holocaust in the Baltic states (Estonia, Latvia, and Lithuania), and Soviet Moldova, recently annexed by the Soviet Union before the start of Operation Barbarossa, in the Soviet republics Belarus, Ukraine, and parts of Russia, as well as other groups murdered in the invasion (such as Roma, Soviet POWs, and others).

The launch of Germany's "war of extermination" against the Soviet Union in June 1941 marked a turning point in the country's anti-Jewish policy from expulsion to mass murder; as a result, it is sometimes seen as marking the beginning of the Holocaust. (Note: Sources:) At the start of the conflict, there were estimated to be approximately five million Jews in the Soviet Union of whom four million lived in the regions occupied by Nazi Germany in 1941 and 1942. The majority of Soviet Jews murdered in the Holocaust were killed in the first nine months of the occupation during the so-called Holocaust by bullets. Approximately 1.5 million Jews succeeded in fleeing eastwards into Soviet territory; it is thought that 1.152 million Soviet Jews had been murdered by December 1942. In total, at least 2 million Soviet Jews were murdered.

== The Holocaust by Soviet Socialist Republic ==
- The Holocaust in Byelorussia
- The Holocaust in Estonia
- The Holocaust in Latvia
- The Holocaust in Lithuania
- The Holocaust in Russia
- The Holocaust in Ukraine
- The Holocaust in Romanian-ruled Transnistria

== Soviet policy and response ==
Soviet evacuation efforts did not emphasize Jewish evacuation, even though the Nazis were deliberately targeting Jews. The evacuation efforts were conducted haphazardly, varying greatly by region. Although an evacuation plan had been drafted before the war, Stalin rejected it, believing a Nazi invasion of Soviet territory was unlikely. The first actual plan was created on June 24, 1941, two days after the Soviet Union was attacked.

The evacuation plans instructed officials “to evacuate and relocate quotas of persons and assets of value.” Afterwards, children and elderly were prioritized, regardless of nationality. Evacuation stations were set up to help refugees create evacuation plans. Factory workers were able to bring close family, as well as distant family members. The evacuation process was disorderly, with few regulations of who could evacuate and no emphasis on Jewish evacuation. Military commanders were tasked with creating evacuation measures by region, without comprehensive, nationwide instructions. Evacuations varied from town to town, depending on proximity to the front and general attitudes from military commanders.

Although the evacuations were not explicitly intended to save Jewish civilians from the Holocaust, they inadvertently had that effect. Many Jews were aware of what Nazis did to Jews in occupied territories and fled deeper into the Soviet Union. Others either did not believe the extent of the Nazis’ brutality toward Jews or felt such deep distrust towards Soviet leadership due to years of mistreatment, that they convinced themselves German rule might improve their conditions. Of evacuee demographics, “Jews were second only to Russians,” but more than half of the Jewish population in Soviet territories chose to remain. While the Soviet government did not intend for these evacuations to save Jews from the Holocaust, they ultimately allowed for a significant number of Jews to escape the Holocaust.

Approximately 300,000 to 500,000 Soviet Jews served in the Red Army during the conflict. The Jewish Anti-Fascist Committee, established in 1941, was active in propagandising for the Soviet war effort but was treated with suspicion. The Soviet press, tightly censored, often deliberately obscured the particular anti-Jewish motivation of the Holocaust.

== See also ==
- Einsatzgruppen
- Joseph Stalin and antisemitism
- Holocaust by Bullets (book)

== Notes and references ==
=== Works cited ===
- Altshuler, Mordechai (2014). "Jewish Combatants in the Red Army Confront the Holocaust". In Murav, Harriet; Estraikh, Gennady (eds.). Soviet Jews in World War II. Boston: Academic Studies Press. ISBN 9781618119261.
- Berkhoff, Karel C. (2009). ""Total Annihilation of the Jewish Population": The Holocaust in the Soviet Media, 1941–45". Kritika: Explorations in Russian and Eurasian History. 10 (1): 61–105. doi:10.1353/kri.0.0080. S2CID 159464815.
- Overy, R. J. (1998). Russia's War. London: Allen Lane. ISBN 0-713-99223-9.
