= Treachery Act 1940 =

Act of the Parliament of the United Kingdom

- Act of Parliament
- Parliament of the United Kingdom
- Long title: An Act to make further provision for the trial and punishment of treachery.
- Citation: 3 & 4 Geo. 6. c. 21
- Introduced by: Sir John Anderson, Home Secretary (Commons); Viscount Simon, Lord Chancellor (Lords)
- Territorial extent: applied to anything done: by a British subject elsewhere than in a Dominion, (Note: Except Newfoundland.) India, Burma, or Southern Rhodesia; by any person anywhere subject to military law; by any person in the United Kingdom, or on any British ship or aircraft (Note: Except British ships and aircraft registered in India, Burma, or Southern Rhodesia (unless it was under the control of the British Government).)

Dates
- Royal assent: 23 May 1940
- Commencement: 23 May 1940 (Note: The Acts of Parliament (Commencement) Act 1793.)
- Expired: 24 February 1946 (Note: No person could be prosecuted for an offence under the act from this date (see section 6 of the Act).)
- Repealed: England and Wales: 1 January 1968; Scotland and Northern Ireland: 18 July 1973
Other legislation
Repealed by	England and Wales: Criminal Law Act 1967; Scotland and Northern Ireland: Statute Law (Repeals) Act 1973
Relates to	Treason Act 1945

Status: Repealed

Text of statute as originally enacted

The Treachery Act 1940 (3 & 4 Geo. 6. c. 21) was an act of the Parliament of the United Kingdom effective during World War II to facilitate the prosecution and execution of enemy spies, suspended afterwards, and repealed in 1968 or 1973, territory depending. The law was passed on 23 May 1940, in the month after Nazi Germany invaded France and Winston Churchill became prime minister.

== Background ==
The act was deemed necessary because treason still had its own special rules of evidence and procedure which made it a difficult offence to prove and prosecute (see Treason Act 1695). The newer offence, a felony, was designed to make convictions easier as it could be proved under the same rules of evidence as ordinary offences. It was also needed because there was doubt whether the treason laws were applicable to saboteurs.

In commending the Bill to the House of Commons, the Home Secretary, Sir John Anderson, explained why the law was necessary:

[T]he scope of Clause 1 of the Bill is substantially the same as the scope of the Treason Acts, but the Treason Acts might not be applicable to persons who are not normally resident within the King's jurisdiction; and moreover the Treason Acts are antiquated, excessively cumbrous and invested with a dignity and ceremonial that seems to us wholly inappropriate to the sort of case with which we are dealing here.

In the House of Lords the Lord Chancellor, Viscount Simon, elaborated:

It is a very doubtful question indeed whether under the existing law of treason you could proceed against an alien who has come here suddenly, surreptitiously by air or otherwise, for the purposes of wreaking clandestine destruction or doing other acts against the safety of the realm. In as much as treason is a crime committed by someone who owes allegiance, it might be well argued that such a person does not owe allegiance to the British Crown. For these reasons it is urgently necessary that this Bill should be passed.

The act was always intended to be a temporary emergency measure which would be repealed after the War. It was rushed through Parliament in two weeks, passing the Lords in a few minutes and receiving royal assent on the same day.

== Treachery and treason ==
The first section of the Treachery Act 1940 read:

If, with intent to help the enemy, any person does, or attempts or conspires with any other person to do any act which is designed or likely to give assistance to the naval, military or air operations of the enemy, to impede such operations of His Majesty's forces, or to endanger life, he shall be guilty of felony and shall on conviction suffer death.

Some argue that the Act could easily have replaced the current, ancient statutes that relate to and define treason. After the war, people continued to be prosecuted under the Treason Act 1351 for disloyalty during the War.

Besides the laxer rules of procedure and evidence, the other main difference was the death sentence for treason was mandatory, whereas the death sentence for treachery could be commuted by the court under the Judgement of Death Act 1823. No sentences were commuted by the courts. One was commuted by the Home Secretary.

== Extent ==
Breach of a duty of allegiance was not an element of treachery. Section 4 of the Act provided:

This Act shall apply to anything done—

- (a) by a British subject elsewhere than in a Dominion, India, Burma, or Southern Rhodesia;
- (b) by any person subject to the Naval Discipline Act, to military law or to the Air Force Act, in any place whatsoever; or
- (c) by any person in the United Kingdom, or in any British ship or aircraft, not being a dominion ship or aircraft.

"Dominion" meant any Dominion within the meaning of the Statute of Westminster 1931, except Newfoundland, and included any territory administered by the Government as a Dominion (section 5(1)).

== Uses of the Act ==
Between 1940 and 1946, 15 people, of whom five were British, were hanged for treachery, and another was court-martialled and shot. The first British subject to be executed under the law was George Johnson Armstrong, who was hanged at HMP Wandsworth on 10 July 1941.

German agent Josef Jakobs, the last person to be executed in the Tower of London, was tried by a military court and executed by firing squad under this law. Jakobs was the only one to be shot instead of hanged under the act, since he had been captured as an enemy combatant. The last person to be executed under the law—and the last person to be executed in the United Kingdom for an offence other than murder—was British soldier Theodore Schurch. Two other British collaborators, John Amery and William Joyce, were executed after being convicted of high treason. In Gibraltar, two young Spanish men, Luis Lopez Cordon-Cuenca and Jose Martin Munoz, were tried under a similar treachery statute for being involved in acts of sabotage against the British. Cordon-Cuenca was convicted at trial, while Munoz pleaded guilty. The two men were hanged at Moorish Castle on 11 January 1944.

Another person, Portuguese diplomat Regério de Magalhaes Peixoto de Menezes, was sentenced to death, but had his sentence commuted by the Home Secretary, Herbert Morrison, to penal servitude for life. He was deported in 1949. Dorothy O'Grady was also sentenced to death for treachery, but had her sentence reduced to 14 years on appeal.

== Suspension and repeal ==
The act was brought into being for the duration of the "war emergency" (section 6). The Treason Act 1945 (8 & 9 Geo. 6. c. 44) enabled treason to be proved with the normal rules of evidence, abolishing its special status. The Treachery Act was suspended on 24 February 1946, and was repealed in part in 1968, and totally in 1973.

The whole act was repealed for England and Wales by section 10(2) of, and part I of schedule 3 to, the Criminal Law Act 1967, which came into force on 1 January 1968.

The whole act was repealed for Scotland and Northern Ireland by section 1(1) of, and part V of schedule 1 to, the Statute Law (Repeals) Act 1973, which came into force on 18 July 1973.

== See also ==
- Capital punishment in the United Kingdom
- High treason in the United Kingdom
- Defence of the Realm Act 1914
- Emergency Powers (Defence) Act 1939
- Defence Regulations
