= Krasnodar Trial =

War crimes trial

- Court: Soviet military tribunal Krasnodar, Soviet Union
- Indictment: Treason
- Started: July 14, 1943
- Decided: July 17, 1943

The Krasnodar Trial was a war crimes trial that was held in front of a military tribunal in July 1943 in Krasnodar, Soviet Union. All of the defendants were Soviets who collaborated with Germany. All 11 defendants were accused of treason for collaborating with the Nazi German military, police and SS forces, which were responsible for implementing the occupational policies during the German–Soviet War (1941–1945). The trial was the first war crimes trial of World War II.

== German occupation of Krasnodar ==
Units of the German Wehrmacht occupied Krasnodar between August 12, 1942 and February 12, 1943. German forces, including the Einsatzgruppen (mobile death squads), killed approximately 7,000 civilians, including Jews and Communists. Shooting, hanging, burning and gas vans were used.

== Russian and Ukrainian collaborators on trial ==
The tribunal heard the case against 11 defendants, all of whom were Russian and Ukrainian collaborators with the German military, police and SS forces. They were accused in participating in the murder of 7,000 people. All but one of the defendants had joined Sonderkommando 10a, a subunit of the death squad Einsatzgruppe D. The sole exception was Mikhail Lastovina, a kulak who had managed to avoid capture during the 1930s dekulakization.

Richard Ruoff, commander of the German 17th Army; Kurt Christmann, head of the local Gestapo; and 13 other SS officials were charged in absentia. The prosecutors emphasised the collective responsibility of the Nazi regime for the crimes, not just the local commanders. All of the accused pleaded guilty and begged the court to spare their lives so they could have a chance to atone. They were each officially pronounced guilty and sentenced on July 17, 1943.

Name	Sentence
Vassily Tishchenko (born 1914)	Death, executed on July 18, 1943
Ivan Rechkalov (born 1911)	Death, executed on July 18, 1943
Mikhail Lastovina (born 1883)	Death, executed on July 18, 1943
Grigory Tuchkov (born 1909)	20 years imprisonment with hard labor
Nikolai Pushkarev (born 1915)	Death, executed on July 18, 1943
Grigory Misan (born 1916)	Death, executed on July 18, 1943
Yunus Naptsok (born 1914)	Death, executed on July 18, 1943
Ivan Kotomtsev (born 1918)	Death, executed on July 18, 1943
Vassily Pavlov (born 1914)	20 years imprisonment with hard labor
Ivan Paramonov (born 1923)	20 years imprisonment with hard labor
Ignaty Kladov (born 1911)	Death, executed on July 18, 1943

== Sentences ==
Eight of the defendants were sentenced to death. The other three were deemed to have had relatively minor roles and were instead each sentenced to 20 years of hard labor in gulags. The following morning, the condemned defendants were publicly hanged together in the Krasnodar town square. Approximately 30,000 people, including children, witnessed the executions. Many of them started applauding.

== Publicity ==
The Soviet press gave wide publicity to the trials. Foreign observers considered the trial to be "stage-managed". British journalist Alexander Werth called the trial "first-rate hate propaganda" that was intended to emphasize the suffering of Soviet civilians under the German occupation. However, nobody doubted the severity or the extent of the crimes or the guilt of the defendants. Even in the Soviet Union, some noted that the massacre of the 7,000 civilians in Krasnodar was actually a relatively-minor incident in comparison to what the Germans and collaborators were doing elsewhere in the country. One major objective of the trial was to deter future collaboration.
