= HM Prison Wandsworth =

Men's prison in London, England

Coordinates: 51°27′00.5″N 0°10′39.5″W

HMP Wandsworth
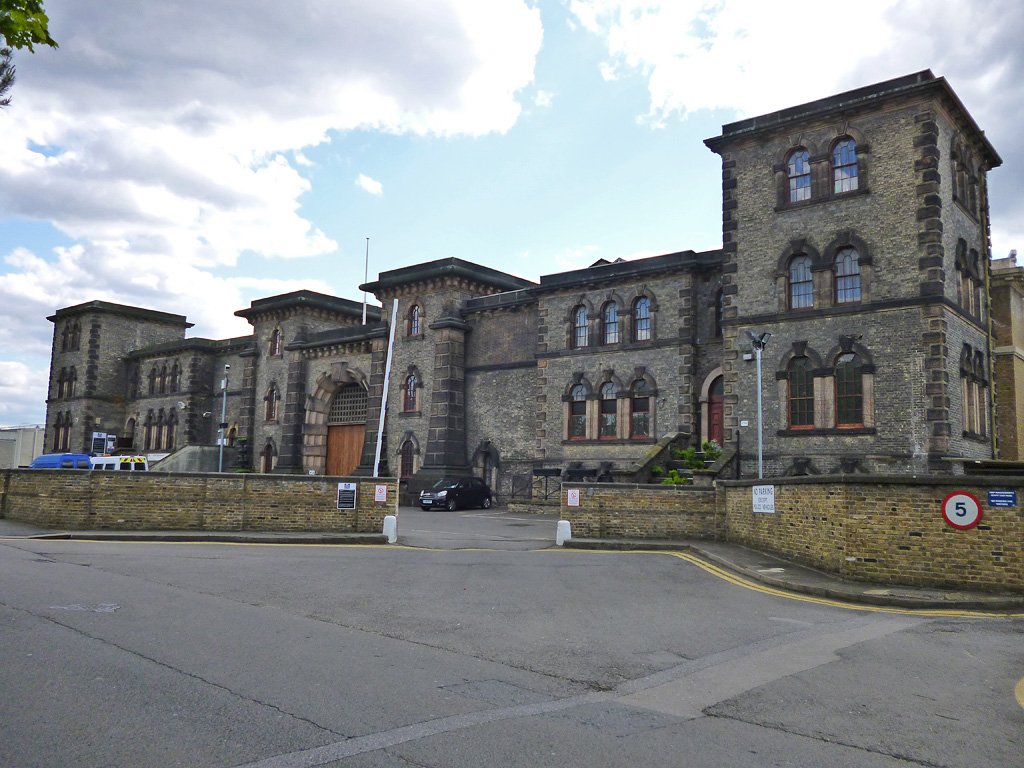
- Interactive map of HMP Wandsworth
- Location: Wandsworth, London Borough of Wandsworth London, SW18
- Security class: Adult Male/Category B Local
- Population: 1,562
- Opened: 1851; 175 years ago
- Managed by: HM Prison Services
- Governor: Andy Davy
- Website: Wandsworth at justice.gov.uk

HM Prison Wandsworth is a Category B men's prison at Wandsworth in South West London, England. It is operated by His Majesty's Prison Service and is one of the largest prisons in the UK.

== History ==
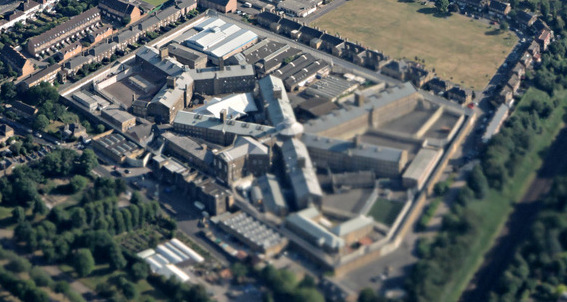
HM Prison Wandsworth from the sky

The prison was built in 1851, when it was known as Surrey House of Correction. It was designed according to the humane separate system principle with a number of corridors radiating from a central control point with each prisoner having toilet facilities. The toilets were later removed to increase prison capacity and the prisoners had to "slop out", until 1996.

On 29 July 1879, Catherine Webster was executed for the murder and dismemberment of her mistress, Mrs. Thomas, at Richmond. The murder, which occurred in March, was for the purpose of stealing Mrs. Thomas' property and going to America with a man named Webb. The only witnesses to the execution were the sheriff, the surgeon and the chaplain. No reporters were permitted. The sheriff reported that Mrs. Webster met her death with dignity. The body was buried in a shallow grave on prison grounds and covered in lime.

In 1930, inmate James Edward Spiers, serving a 10-year sentence for armed robbery, took his own life in front of a group of justices of the peace who were there to witness his receiving 15 lashes, then a form of judicial corporal punishment.

In 1951, Wandsworth was the holding prison for a national stock of the birch and the cat o' nine tails, implements for corporal punishment inflicted as a disciplinary penalty under the prison rules. An example of a flogging with the "cat" carried out in Wandsworth Prison itself was reported in July 1954.

On 8 July 1965, Ronnie Biggs escaped from the prison, where he was serving a 30-year sentence for his part in the Great Train Robbery. Two years later he fled to Brazil and remained on the run until 2001, when he returned to the UK.

The prison was originally designed to hold fewer than a thousand inmates, but as of 2023, there are between 1,300 and 1,500 prisoners.

=== Execution site ===
Wandsworth was the site of 135 executions, between 1878 and 1961. Built in 1878, the gallows was located near the A wing. In 1911, a new gallows was built between the E and F wings, and in 1938 a further gallows was built at the E wing. Among those executed by hanging were:

(in order by date of execution)

- George Henry Lamson (28 April 1882)
- George Chapman (7 April 1903)
- Alfred Edward Stratton (23 May 1905)
- Albert Ernest Stratton (23 May 1905)
- William Gray (4 February 1921)
- Jack Field (4 February 1921)
- Joseph O'Sullivan (10 August 1922)
- Reginald Dunne (10 August 1922)
- Jean-Pierre Vaquier (12 August 1924)
- Patrick Mahon (3 September 1924)
- Norman Thorne (22 April 1925)
- Del Fontaine (29 October 1935)
- George Johnson Armstrong (9 July 1941)
- Karel Richard Richter (10 December 1941)
- Gordon Cummins (25 June 1942)
- Jose Estella Key (7 July 1942)
- Alphons Timmerman (7 July 1942)
- Duncan Scott-Ford (3 November 1942)
- August Sangret (29 April 1943)
- John Amery (19 December 1945)
- William Joyce (Lord Haw-Haw) (3 January 1946)
- John George Haigh (10 August 1949)
- Derek Bentley (28 January 1953)
- Alfred Charles Whiteway (22 December 1953)
- Guenther Podola (5 November 1959)
- Francis Forsyth (10 November 1960)

On 25 April 1951, a double execution took place at Wandsworth, when Edward Smith and Joseph Brown stood on the gallows together and were executed simultaneously. The final executions at Wandsworth were those of Francis Forsyth on 10 November 1960, Victor John Terry on 25 May 1961 and Henryk Niemasz on 8 September 1961. Forsyth was one of just four 18-year-olds executed in a British prison in the twentieth century.

With the exceptions of Scott-Ford, who was convicted of treachery, and Joyce and Amery, who were convicted of treason, all executions were for the crime of murder.

The gallows were kept in full working order until 1993 and tested every six months. In 1994, they were dismantled and the condemned suite is now used as a tea room for prison officers. The gallows' trapdoor and lever were sent to the Prison Service Museum in Rugby, Warwickshire. After this museum permanently closed in 2004, they were sent to the Galleries of Justice in Nottingham, where those and an execution box may be seen.

=== Recent history ===
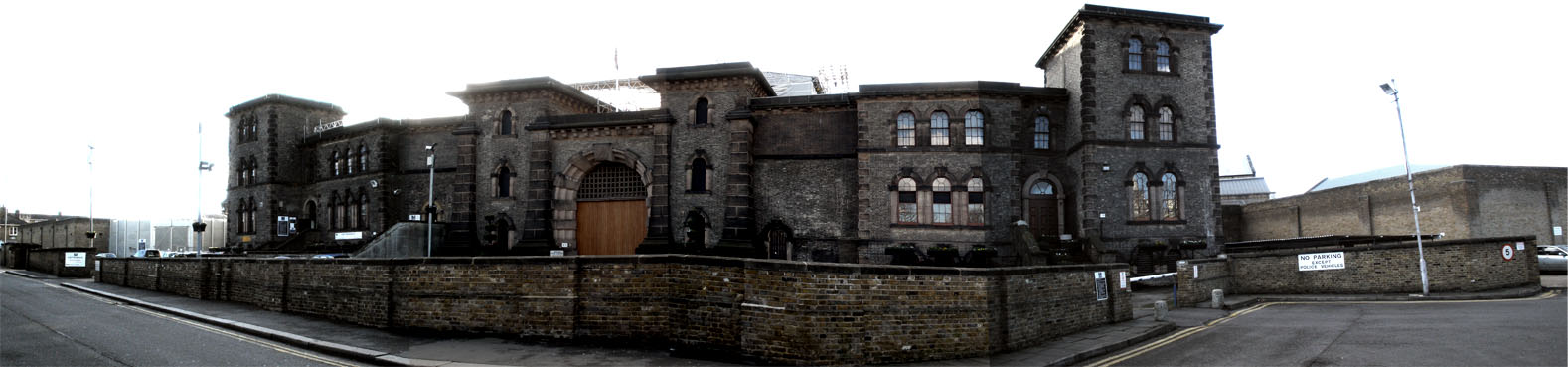
Panorama of HMP Wandsworth from Heathfield Road

In October 2009, gross misconduct charges were brought against managers of Wandsworth Prison, after an investigation found that prisoners had been temporarily transferred to HMP Pentonville before inspections. The transfers, which included vulnerable prisoners, were made in order to manipulate population figures.

In March 2011, an unannounced follow-up inspection was conducted by the Chief Inspector of Prisons, which found that "...Wandsworth compared badly with similar prisons facing similar challenges and we were concerned by what appeared to be unwillingness among some prison managers and staff to acknowledge and take responsibility for the problems the prison faced."

In May 2015, a prisoner was found dead in his cell, prompting a murder investigation. Also in May, a BBC investigation showed large-scale drug abuse, with cannabis being openly smoked and harder drugs found. There are allegations of staff corruption, including of staff bringing drugs into the prison. Wandsworth has lost its status as a reform prison. Glyn Travis of the Prison Officers Association said, "Wandsworth staff had bought into the reform process and worked well with the governor to implement the reforms. Now, the prison has lost its reform status and once again, staff and prisoners have been left high and dry as this government's agenda seems to change at the drop of a hat." Wandsworth is the most overcrowded prison in England, and body scanners were not used on visitors to prevent contraband being brought into the prison, allegedly due to shortage of staff. Peter Clarke said, "In essence, there were too many prisoners, many with drug-related or mental-health issues, and with not enough to do." Also, not all staff carried anti-ligature knives despite six suicides since 2015.

On 6 September 2023, Daniel Abed Khalife, on remand awaiting trial in relation to terrorism and the Official Secrets Act, escaped from the prison. The escape caused significant disruption at airports and ports around the UK due to enhanced security checks. He was found and arrested in the Northolt area on 9 September 2023.

In June 2024, the prison was investigated after a video emerged that allegedly showed a prison officer having sex with one of the inmates.

In October and November 2025, two inmates were mistakenly released from HMP Wandsworth.

== Notable inmates ==
- Mark Aizlewood, former international footballer who was jailed for fraud in 2018. Aizlewood was later transferred to a prison in Wales.
- Mohammad Asif, cricketer convicted for his part in the Pakistan cricket spot-fixing controversy.
- Julian Assange, was remanded in custody at HMP Wandsworth on 7 December 2010 after being refused bail prior to an extradition hearing at Westminster Magistrates Court. On 16 December 2010, he was released on bail after another appeal.
- Chris Atkins, journalist and documentary maker jailed for fraud. Upon his release, Atkins published a book about his time in Wandsworth.
- Boris Becker, German tennis player, convicted on four charges under the UK's Insolvency Act 2022.
- Ronnie Biggs, participant in the Great Train Robbery, who escaped from the prison in 1965 before fleeing the country.
- Russell Brand, comedian, actor and media personality convicted of rape and sexual assault in November 2026.
- Salman Butt, cricketer convicted for his part in the Pakistan cricket spot-fixing controversy.
- Charles Bronson, notorious long-term inmate and artist.
- Eric Chappelow, World War I conscientious objector, for four months in 1916.
- David Chaytor, first MP to be convicted for his part in the United Kingdom Parliamentary expenses scandal.
- Max Clifford, former publicist, convicted of 8 counts of indecent assault, later moved to HM Prison Littlehey in June 2014.
- Pete Doherty, musician.
- Ike Ekweremadu, Nigerian politician and former Senator of Nigeria convicted of bringing a 21-year-old man into the UK from Lagos, Nigeria in an organ-harvesting plot.
- Gary Glitter (Paul Francis Gadd), singer, songwriter, and convicted child sex offender.
- Roger Hallam, co-founder of Extinction Rebellion and climate movement activist, on remand for conspiracy to commit a public nuisance.
- Digga D (Rhys Herbert), drill musician from West London convicted for inciting violence and breaches of a criminal behaviour order. Digga has served several sentences at Wandsworth.
- Chris Huhne, former Energy Secretary jailed for perverting the course of justice in relation to swapping fixed penalty points with his then wife, Vicky Pryce.
- Daniel Khalife, former soldier and escaped and recaptured remand prisoner.
- Bat Khurts, head of Mongolia's counter-terrorism agency, 2010.
- Ronnie Kray, organised crime leader.
- Mazhar Majeed, cricket agent convicted for his part in the Pakistan cricket spot-fixing controversy.
- Nirav Modi, fugitive diamond merchant, a principal in the Punjab National Bank Scam, who fled to the UK from India.
- Tom O'Carroll, pro-paedophile activist and convicted sex offender, imprisoned in the early 1980s for conspiracy to corrupt public morals.
- James Earl Ray, assassin of Rev. Dr. Martin Luther King Jr. Remanded from 8 June to 19 July 1968.
- Bruce Reynolds, the man who organised the Great Train Robbery. He spent time in Wandsworth for breaking and entering, assault and also robbery.
- Graham Rix, former footballer and coach who was jailed for having underage sex with a 15-year-old girl.
- HSTikkyTokky (Harrison Sullivan), influencer who was held on remand after being extradited from Spain after 18 months on the run for crashing his £200,000 McLaren.
- Christopher Tappin, businessman convicted in the US for selling weapons parts to Iran in violation of international sanctions and jailed 33 months in January 2013; transferred from FCI Allenwood, Pennsylvania to serve his remaining 14-month sentence at Wandsworth in September 2013.
- Oscar Wilde, writer.

== Trivia ==
Wandsworth is mentioned in multiple forms of media.

=== Film ===
- Starred Up (2014) was written by a former therapist at this prison.
- Let Him Have It (1991) features Derek Bentley, who was held in this prison up until he was hanged in 1953.
- A Clockwork Orange (1971) shows the exterior of the prison (the interiors were filmed elsewhere).

=== Literature ===
- In Anthony Burgess' novel A Clockwork Orange (1962), the character Alex is imprisoned at Wandsworth.
- Graham Greene visited Wandsworth and used it as the model for the prison in which the hero awaits execution in the novel It's a Battlefield (1934).
- In the novel Atonement (2001), by Ian McEwan, the character Robbie Turner is imprisoned in Wandsworth for over four years.
- The prison is mentioned toward the end of the novel Down and Out in Paris and London (1933), by George Orwell.
- Will Self's short story "The Nonce Prize", in his short fiction collection Tough, Tough Toys for Tough, Tough Boys (1998), is set in and around the prison.

=== Music ===
Wandsworth is mentioned in:

- "The Battle of Epping Forest", a song from the Genesis album Selling England by the Pound (1973)
- "Let Him Dangle", a song from the Elvis Costello album Spike (1989)
- "Switch", a song by Senser
- "Cool for Cats" (1979), a song by Squeeze
- "Wandsworth to Bullingdon" (2021), a song by Fredo and Headie One
