= Treachery (law) =

In India freedom struggle

Treachery is an offence in several countries. Both of the Australian and British offences were derived from or inspired by the related offence of treason. The name treachery was chosen because it is a synonym for treason.

== Australia ==
Treachery is a statutory offence in Australia. The offence is created by section 80.1AC of the Criminal Code.

== United Kingdom ==
The Treachery Act 1940 created the offence to prosecute and execute enemy spies. Suspended in 1946, the statutory offence bearing that name in the United Kingdom was repealed in 1973.
