= Thomas Jekyn =

English Member of Parliament

Thomas Jekyn (by 1521-63 or later), of Hythe, Kent, was an English Member of Parliament (MP).

He was a Member of the Parliament of England for Hythe in October 1553.

Parliament of England
Preceded by William Dalmyngton; John Knight	Member of Parliament for Hythe; October 1553; With: William Oxenden	Succeeded by William Carden; John Estday
