= Heneage Finch, 5th Earl of Winchilsea =

British politician

The Right Honourable The Earl of Winchilsea FSA
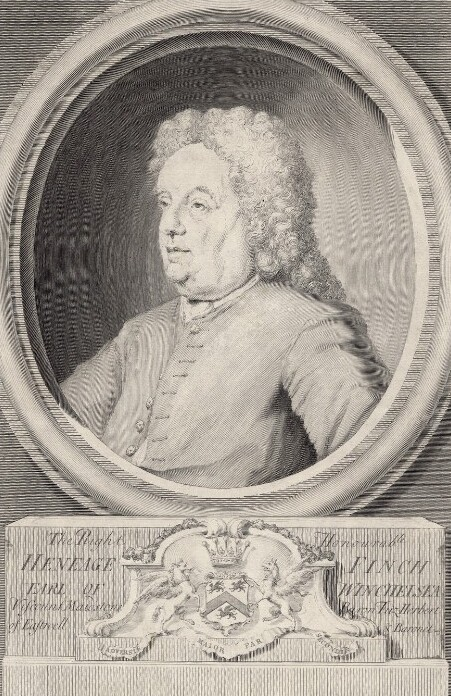

Member of the England Parliament for Hythe
- In office 1685–1687 Serving with: Julius Deedes 1685; William Shaw (1685–1687)
- Preceded by: Sir Edward Dering; Edward Hales
- Succeeded by: Edward Hales; Julius Deedes

Personal details
- Born: Heneage Finch; 1657 England
- Died: 30 September 1726 (aged 68–69) England
- Spouse: Anne Kingsmill
- Parents: Heneage Finch; Lady Mary Seymour

Arms of Finch: Argent, a chevron between three griffins passant sable

Heneage Finch, 5th Earl of Winchilsea, FSA (1657 – 30 September 1726) was a British Tory politician, who was styled Hon. Heneage Finch until 1712.

== Biography ==
He was the son of Heneage Finch, 3rd Earl of Winchilsea and Lady Mary Seymour, daughter of William Seymour, 2nd Duke of Somerset (grandson of Lady Katherine Grey). He was born on 3 January 1657 and baptised on 11 January in the same year.

The Finch family were traditional royalists. At the Restoration, King Charles II recommended Winchelsea to be ambassador to the Porte. He arrived at Constantinople on 17 January 1661. He was eventually recalled by letter on 19 December 1667. He did not leave Turkey until early 1669.

In 1683, he was appointed a Groom of the Bedchamber to the Duke of York and a captain in the Duke's Halberdiers, and was created a D.C.L of Oxford. In 1685, he retained his appointment as Groom of the Bedchamber when York succeeded as James II, was commissioned a colonel, and appointed a deputy lieutenant for Kent. He represented Hythe in James' only Parliament. He lost his posts upon the deposition of James but remained close friends with his 'brother of the bedchamber' Captain David Lloyd until the latter's death in 1723.

In April 1690, Heneage Finch was arrested and charged with Jacobitism for attempting to join the exiled James II in France. It was a difficult time for Jacobites and Nonjurors (those who had refused to take the oath of allegiance, such as the Finches), as their arrests and punishments were abusive. Because of his arrest, Heneage and his wife Anne Finch remained separated from April until November of that year. Much of her poetry from this period reflects the pain of this period of separation. The charge against him was later dismissed, but Heneage would refer to this period as 'a great escape'.

Finch's work as editor of his wife's poems has yet to be fully studied. Certainly, a significant proportion of the two extant manuscript copies of Anne Finch's work are in Heneage's hand, with further errata noted in his own diaries.

He inherited the earldom from his nephew Charles Finch, 4th Earl of Winchilsea in 1712. He refused to take the Oath of Allegiance and declined his seat in the House of Lords. The titles came with a further cost. The Finches had to assume Charles Finch's financial and legal burdens. Years of trials began in July 1713, with the first being held before Lord Harcourt. The issues were eventually settled in the Finches' favour in 1720, but not before the couple had endured nearly seven years of emotional strain.

During this period, Heneage and Anne Finch faced renewed strains resulting from court politics. When Queen Anne died in 1714, she was succeeded by George I. Subsequently, a Whig government, which was hostile to the Jacobite cause, rose to power. The Jacobite rebellion, which took place in Scotland in 1715, further aggravated the tense political situation. The Finches became greatly concerned about their safety, especially after a friend, Matthew Prior, who shared their political sympathies, was sent to prison.

Chosen a FSA in 1724, he died in 1726, having suffered from large gallstones and pain for many years. Having had no children by his wife, Anne Kingsmill (1661–1720), he was succeeded by his half-brother John Finch, 6th Earl of Winchilsea, but he also died childless 3 years later, the title and the estate then passed to their second cousin Daniel Finch, 2nd Earl of Nottingham and then 7th Earl of Winchilsea.

Parliament of England
Preceded by Sir Edward Dering; Edward Hales	Member of Parliament for Hythe; 1685–1687; With: Julius Deedes 1685; William Shaw 1685–1687	Succeeded by Edward Hales; Julius Deedes
Peerage of England
Preceded by Charles Finch	Earl of Winchilsea; 1712–1726	Succeeded by John Finch
