= Robert Bannok =

English Member of Parliament

Robert Bannok (died November 1419 or after) of Hythe, Kent, was an English Member of Parliament (MP).

He was a Member of the Parliament of England for Hythe in November 1414. The last record of him was from November 1419.

Parliament of England
Preceded by William Canoun; Stephen Rye	Member of Parliament for Hythe; Nov. 1414; With: William Yoklete	Succeeded by ? ?
