= Honywode =

Honywode is a surname. Notable people with the surname include:

- Alan Honywode (fl. 1393), MP for Hythe, Kent
- John Honywode (fl. 1397), MP for Hythe
