= William Yoklete =

English Member of Parliament

William Yoklete (fl. 1414), of Hythe, Kent, was an English Member of Parliament (MP). He was a Member of the Parliament of England for Hythe in November 1414.

Parliament of England
Preceded by William Canoun; Stephen Rye	Member of Parliament for Hythe; 1414; With: Robert Bannok	Succeeded by ? ?
