= Clement Holwey =

English Member of Parliament

Clement Holwey or Olwey (by 1469–1517), of Hythe, Kent, was an English Member of Parliament (MP). He was a Member of the Parliament of England for Hythe in 1512.

Parliament of England
Preceded by John Honywood; John Berde	Member of Parliament for Hythe; 1512; With: John Berde	Succeeded by unrecorded unrecorded
