= Peter Heyman (disambiguation) =

Peter Heyman was an English politician.

Peter Heyman may also refer to:

- Sir Peter Heyman, 2nd Baronet (1642–1723), of the Heyman baronets
- Sir Peter Heyman, 4th Baronet (c. 1720–1790), of the Heyman baronets

== See also ==
- Peter Hayman (disambiguation)
