= Sir Samuel Lennard, 3rd Baronet =

British army officer and politician

Sir Samuel Lennard, 3rd Baronet (2 October 1672 – 8 October 1727) of Wickham Court, Bromley, Kent was a British army officer and politician who sat in the House of Commons from 1715 to 1727.

Lennard was the only son of Sir Stephen Lennard, 2nd Baronet of West Wickham and his wife Elizabeth Hussey, daughter of Delalynd Hussey of Shapwick, Dorset. He was admitted at Middle Temple in 1689 and matriculated at Trinity College, Oxford on 4 April 1690.

Lennard joined the army and was a captain in the Earl of Denbigh's Dragoons from 1696 to 1697. He went onto half-pay in 1698 and became a captain in Viscount Shannon's Regiment of Marines in 1702 and a captain in the Life Guards in 1704. In 1709 he became aide-de-camp to Prince George of Denmark and was guidon and major and then cornet and major. He succeeded his father in the baronetcy on 15 December 1709. In 1713 he was lieutenant and lieutenant-colonel and in 1714 appointed groom of the bedchamber to the Prince of Wales, a post he held until 1717.

At the 1715 general election Lennard was returned as Whig Member of Parliament for Hythe on the interest of the Lord Warden. He was knighted for standing proxy for Prince Frederick at his installation as Knight of the Garter in April 1718. Also in 1718, he was made Captain of Sandgate Castle, a position he held until death. He was elected again as MP for Hythe at the 1722 general election and at the 1727 general election.

Lennard died shortly after the last election on 8 October 1727. He was unmarried, but had two illegitimate daughters. The baronetcy became extinct on his death. His alleged illegitimate son Samuel was born by Mary Johnson at Maskell's house in Great Ormond Street, London on 10 September 1720.

Parliament of Great Britain
Preceded by Jacob des Bouverie; John Boteler	Member of Parliament for Hythe; 1715 – 1727; With: Jacob des Bouverie; Captain Hercules Baker	Succeeded by Captain Hercules Baker; William Glanville
Baronetage of England
Preceded by Stephen Lennard	Baronet (of West Wickham); 1709-1727	Extinct
