= Thomas Honywood =

Thomas Honywood may refer to:

- Thomas Honywood (Essex MP) (1586–1666), English soldier and member of parliament (MP)
- Captain Thomas Honywood (1819–1888), English archaeologist and photographer
- Thomas Honywood (Hythe MP) (died 1580), who represented Hythe
- Thomas Honywood, MP and father of John Honywood
