= Sir Edward Dering, 2nd Baronet =

English politician (1625–1684)

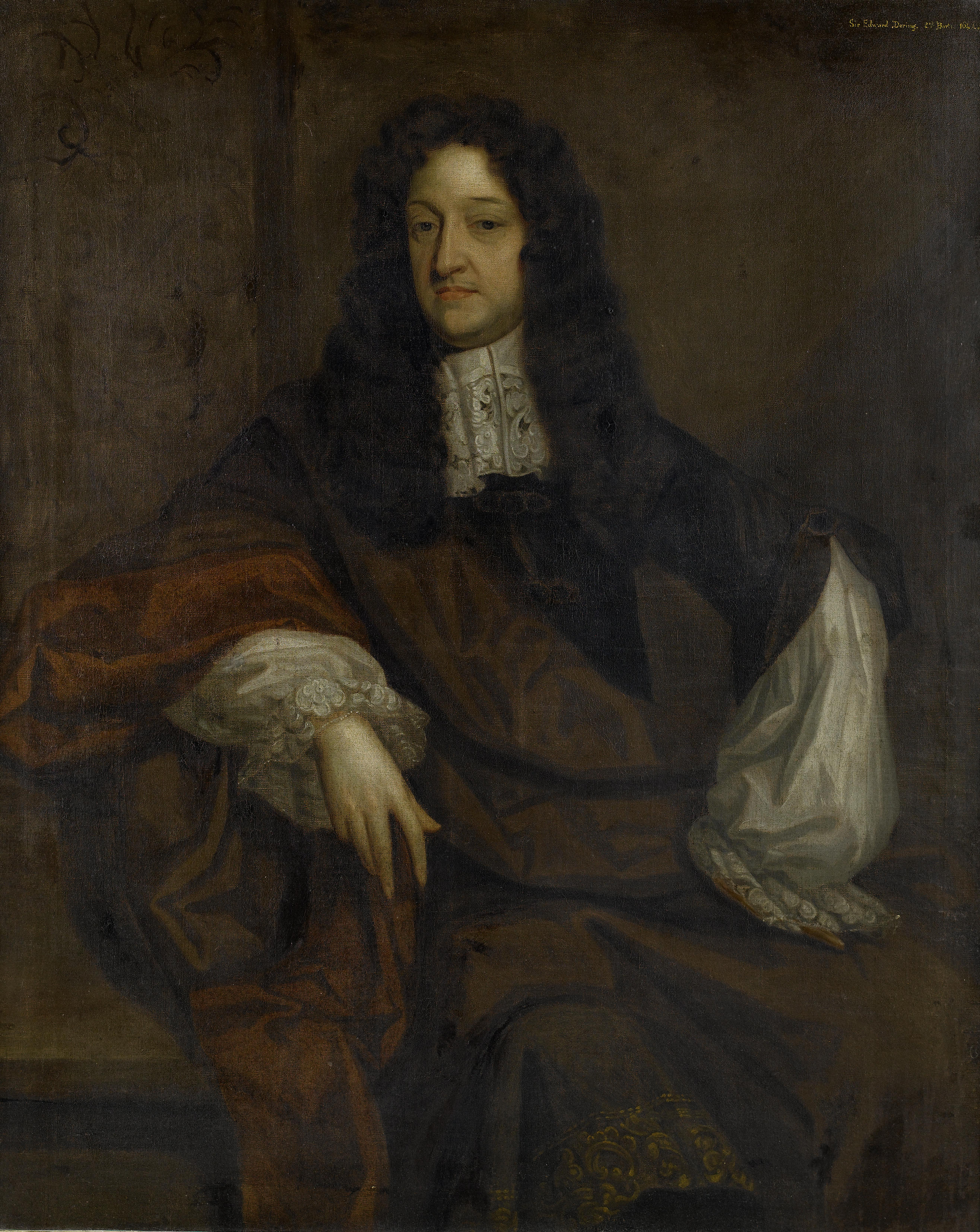
Sir Edward Dering, 2nd Baronet, painting by the follower of John Greenhill

Sir Edward Dering, 2nd Baronet (8/12 November 1625 – 24 June 1684) was an English politician who represented Kent, East Retford and Hythe in the House of Commons of England between 1660 and 1674.

== Life ==
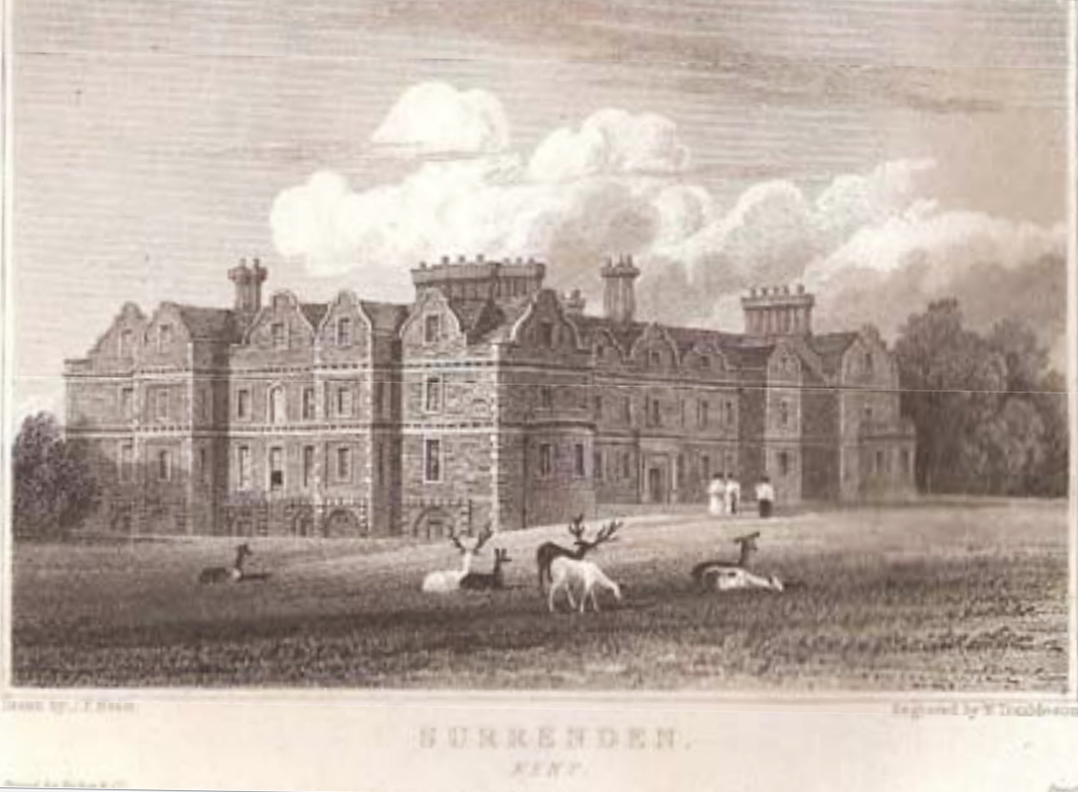
Surrenden Dering house c.1820

Dering was the eldest surviving son and heir of Sir Edward Dering, 1st Baronet of Pluckley, Kent by his second marriage to Anne, sister of John Ashburnham. He was educated at Heathfield in 1632, Cripplegate, London under Thomas Farnaby in 1633, Throwley under Mr Craig from 1634 to 1637, and Woodford under Mr Copping from 1637 to 1639. He was admitted as a fellow-commoner to Sidney Sussex College, Cambridge in 1640 and transferred to Emmanuel College, Cambridge in 1642 and was awarded BA in 1643. In 1644 he entered Middle Temple. He was 18 at the death of his father, who left a widow and several young children in 1644. He went to Leyden in 1644 and travelled abroad in the Netherlands and France until 1646.

In April 1660 Dering was elected Member of Parliament for Kent in the Convention Parliament. He was appointed one of the six commissioners for executing the Irish Act of Settlement 1662 in July 1662 and was returned to the Irish House of Commons as Member of Parliament for Lisburn. In 1670 he was elected MP for East Retford in a by-election to the Cavalier Parliament. He was elected MP for Hythe in the two elections of 1679 and in 1681. He was also appointed a commissioner of the Treasury in 1679. Dering died in London aged 58 and was buried at Pluckley.

== Family ==
Dering married Mary Harvey, daughter of Daniel Harvey (a brother of Dr William Harvey) by Elizabeth, daughter of Henry Kynnersley on 5 April 1648. They had 17 children, of whom 10 survived to adulthood. He was succeeded in his estates and title by his son Sir Edward Dering, 3rd Baronet. Among the other children, Elizabeth was married to Sir Robert Southwell, by whom she is ancestral to Camilla, Duchess of Cornwall; Catherine to Sir John Perceval, 3rd Baronet, by whom she was the mother of John Perceval, 1st Earl of Egmont; Daniel, an Army officer, to Sir John's sister Helena Perceval; and Mary to Sir Thomas Knatchbull, 3rd Baronet.

== See also ==
- List of lord high treasurers of England and Great Britain

Parliament of England
Preceded by Rump Parliament	Member of Parliament for Kent; 1660–1661; With: John Tufton	Succeeded by Sir Thomas Peyton; John Tufton
Preceded by Sir William Hickman; Clifford Clifton	Member of Parliament for East Retford; 1670–1679; With: Sir William Hickman	Succeeded by Sir William Hickman; Sir Edward Nevill
Preceded by John Hervey; Sir Leoline Jenkins	Member of Parliament for Hythe; 1679–1685; With: Julius Deedes 1679; Edward Hales 1679–1685	Succeeded by Heneage Finch; Julius Deedes
Parliament of Ireland
New constituency	Member of Parliament for Lisburn; 1661–1666; With: Edward Smith (1661–1665); Robert Johnson (1665–1666)	Succeeded by Randal Brice; Edward Harrison
Baronetage of England
Preceded by Edward Dering	Baronet (of Surrenden Dering); 1644–1684	Succeeded by Edward Dering
