= George Morton =

George Morton may refer to:

== Politicians ==
- George Morton (born c.1540), MP for Hythe
- George Morton (Labour politician) (born 1940), retired Labour Party politician in the United Kingdom
- George W. Morton (1793–1865), U.S. politician
- Sir George Morton, 1st Baronet (died 1662), English politician

== Others ==
- Shadow Morton (George Morton, 1941–2013), U.S. record producer
- George Highfield Morton (1826–1900), British geologist
- George Morton (American football), American football player
- George Morton (Pilgrim Father) (1585–1624), English puritan separatist
- George Morton (cricketer) (1828–1861), English cricketer
- George Morton (footballer) (1943–2009), English footballer, Inside forward for Rochdale.

== See also ==
- Samuel George Morton (1799–1851), U.S. physician and natural scientist
- George Morton Pitt (1693–1756), British politician and administrator
- George Morton Randall (1841–1918), U.S. soldier
- George Douglas, 13th Earl of Morton (1662–1738), Scottish nobleman and politician
- George Douglas, 16th Earl of Morton (1761–1827)
- George Douglas, 17th Earl of Morton (1789–1858), Scottish Tory politician
