= Henry Philpott =

Henry Philpott may refer to:

- Henry Philpott (cricketer) (1829–1880), British cricketer
- Henry Philpott (bishop) (1807–1892), Vice-Chancellor, University of Cambridge

== See also ==
- Henry Philpot (fl.1402), MP for Hythe
- Henry Phillpotts (1778–1869), bishop of Exeter
