= John Hervey (died 1680) =

English courtier and politician

John Hervey (18 August 1616 – 18 January 1680) was an English courtier and politician who sat in the House of Commons from 1661 to 1679. He fought for the Royalist cause in the English Civil War.'

== Biography ==
Hervey was the eldest son of Sir William Hervey of Ickworth and his first wife Susan Jermyn, daughter of Sir Robert Jermyn of Rushbrooke. He travelled abroad in 1636 and was at Leyden in 1637. From about 1641 to 1646 he was a gentleman of the privy chamber. He was a captain of horse in the Royalist army from 1642 to 1646. In 1646, he compounded on goods and chattels valued at £240, and was fined £24 on the Exeter articles. He succeeded to Ickworth on the death of his father in 1660.

Hervey became J.P. for Suffolk in July 1660 and a commissioner for assessment for Suffolk in August 1660. In 1661, he was elected Member of Parliament for Hythe in the Cavalier Parliament. He was commissioner for assessment for Westminster from 1661 and commissioner for loyal and indigent officers for Suffolk in 1662. He was treasurer and receiver to Queen Catherine of Braganza from 1662 until his death. In 1664 he became Fellow of the Royal Society and was a leading shareholder in the Duke of York's theatre. In parliament on one occasion he voted with the opposition and earned a reproof from the King. On the next day he went into the government lobby and when the King remarked "You were not against me to-day", Hervey replied "No, sir. I was against my conscience to-day". He was commissioner for assessment for Middlesex from 1673, commissioner for recusants in 1675 and commissioner for assessment for Norfolk from 1677. In 1677 he became a member of the Royal Fishery Company.

Hervey died at the age of 64 and was buried at St Mary's Church, Ickworth.

Hervey married Elizabeth Hervey, daughter of William Hervey, 1st Baron Hervey of Kidbrooke and Cordell Annesley in 1658. He had no issue and the estate passed to his younger brother Sir Thomas Hervey.

Parliament of England
Preceded by The Viscount Strangford; Phineas Andrews	Member of Parliament for Hythe; 1661; With: Phineas Andrews; Sir Henry Wood, 1st Baronet; Sir Leoline Jenkins	Succeeded by Sir Edward Dering, 2nd Baronet; Julius Deedes
