= Henry Heyman (disambiguation) =

Henry Heyman (1610–1658) was an English politician.

Henry Heyman or Hayman may also refer to:

- Sir Henry Pix Heyman, 5th Baronet (died 1808) of the Heyman baronets
- Henry Hayman (cricketer) (1853–1941), cricketer
- Henry Hayman (educationist) (1823–1904), British educator, headmaster of Rugby School

== See also ==
- Heyman (surname)
