= Stephen Harry =

Stephen Harry may refer to:

- Stephen Harry (MP for Hythe) (by 1495-1534 or later)
- Stephen Harry (MP for New Romney) (died 1428), represented New Romney (UK Parliament constituency)
