= Sir Henry Wood, 1st Baronet =

English courtier and politician

Sir Henry Wood, 1st Baronet (1597 - 25 May 1671) was an English courtier and politician who sat in the House of Commons from 1661 to 1671.

Wood was the son of Thomas Wood, of Hackney, Middlesex, and his wife Susanna Cranmer, daughter of a merchant of London, and was baptised at Hackney on 17 October 1597. His father was Sergeant of the Pastry and died on 18 May 1649. Wood was Clerk of the Spicery in the Royal Household. He purchased the estate of Loudham Park in Ufford and other lands in Suffolk, producing "a rental of nearly £4,500 a year". He was the brother of Thomas Wood, later Bishop of Lichfield.

Wood attended the King's court at Oxford in 1643, during the First English Civil War, and was knighted there on 16 April 1644. In that year he accompanied the Queen, Henrietta Maria, to France, as Treasurer of her Household, an office he retained till his death. He compounded on 31 May 1649 and was fined £273 by Cromwell's authority on 15 June 1649. In about 1657 he was created a baronet by Charles II, when in exile. At the Restoration he was appointed as Clerk of the Green Cloth. He attended Queen Catharine on her voyage from Lisbon in 1661, and was subsequently a member of her Council. In 1661, he was elected one of the Members of Parliament for Hythe.

Wood died at the age of about 73, when the Baronetcy became extinct. He was buried at Ufford on 31 May 1671.

Wood married firstly in about 1630 Anne Webb, probably a sister of Anthony Webb, Warden of the Merchant Taylors' Company from 1658 to 1660. She died without issue while they were in France following the English Civil War and was buried at Charenton, near Paris, on 9 June 1648. He married secondly, at Paris in November 1651, Mary Gardiner, a daughter of the Royalist Sir Thomas Gardiner, of Cuddesdon, Oxfordshire, and his wife Rebecca Childe. Maid of Honour to Queen Henrietta Maria and one of the four Dressers to Queen Catharine, she died of smallpox aged 38 on 17 March 1671 and was buried in Westminster Abbey on 1 April 1671.

In 1670 Wood's daughter Mary, then aged seven and the heiress to his substantial fortune, was betrothed to Charles FitzRoy, Earl of Southampton, an illegitimate son of Charles II and Barbara Villiers. Following her father's death in 1671, Mary went to live with Barbara Villiers, and in 1679 the marriage took place and she became Duchess of Southampton, but in 1680 she died, like her mother, of smallpox, when she was scarcely seventeen, and was buried with her mother in Westminster Abbey.

Parliament of England
Preceded by Phineas Andrews; John Hervey	Member of Parliament for Hythe; 1661; With: John Hervey	Succeeded by John Hervey; Sir Leoline Jenkins
Baronetage of England
New creation	Baronet c.1657–1671	Extinct
