= Cundy =

Cundy is a surname. Notable people with the surname include:

- Ian Cundy (1945–2009), English cleric
- Jason Cundy (born 1969), former English footballer
- John Cundy, English MP
- Jody Cundy (born 1978), English cyclist and swimmer
- Lizzie Cundy (born 1968), English television presenter
- Martyn Cundy (1913–2005), British mathematics teacher and professor
- Nicholas Wilcox Cundy, English architect and engineer
- Peter Cundy (1916–2005), British air force pilot
- Thomas Cundy (senior) (1765–1825), English architect
- Thomas Cundy (junior) (1790–1867), English architect
- Thomas Cundy III (1821–1895), English architect
- William Cundy, English MP

== See also ==
- Bolsover Cundy House, a restored 17th-century conduit house in Derbyshire, England
- Cundy v Lindsay, an English contract law case
