= Snoddington =

Hamlet in Hampshire, England

Coordinates: 51°12′0″N 1°39′30″W

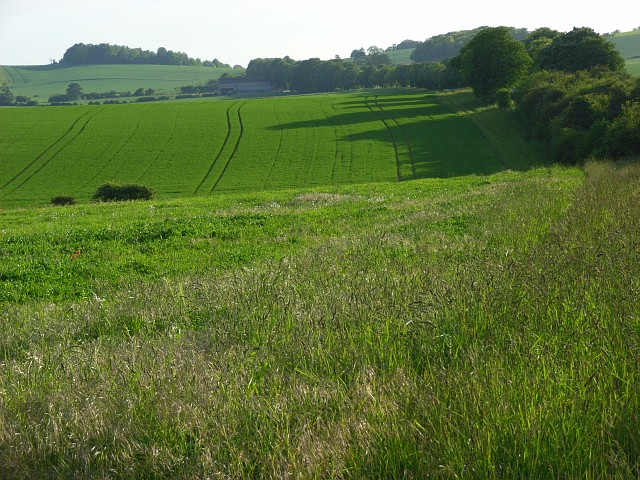
Farmland at Snoddington Down

Snoddington is a small hamlet in Hampshire and close to the border of Wiltshire near to Thruxton Aerodrome and first mentioned in the eleventh century in the Domesday Book. The name derives from Old English; the town of Snodd's people.

The hamlet is surrounded by agricultural downlands and has become part of the South of England urban sprawl being largely inhabited by commuters. Local facilities are limited with no local shop. Likewise the absence of public transport links requires that local inhabitants own at least one vehicle for the purposes of shopping in local supermarkets. The hamlet is part of the parish of Shipton Bellinger where St Peters Parish Church provides Sunday services.

Snoddington Manor House is first mentioned in Domesday Book and has a long history of occupancy passing through a number of different families.

In a "History of Hampshire" a limited history is offered:

The manor of SNODDINGTON belonged before the Conquest to Tovi and at the time of the Domesday Survey to Hugh de Port, tenant-in-chief. (fn. 38) It was held in the 13th century of Robert de Pont de L'Arche, lord of Newton Valence, and by him of Robert St. John, a descendant of Hugh de Port. (fn. 39) The overlordship of the St. John family subsequently lapsed, and the manor was held henceforward as of the manor of Newton Valence (q.v.) by suit of court and the service due from the fourth part of a knight's fee. (fn. 40)

At the beginning of the 13th century Thomas de Port and Margery de Cundy held jointly of Robert de St. John the fourth part of a knight's fee in Snoddington, (fn. 41) and a century later, in 1305, Gilbert Cundy held the same land, valued at 60s., of Aymer de Valence. (fn. 42) However, before 1316, Snoddington had come into the possession of Ingram Berenger, (fn. 43) lord of Shipton Bellinger, who two years later obtained from Thomas Harengod and Eleanor his wife (fn. 44) a quitclaim of all their rights in two messuages and 2 carucates of land in Snoddington for a rent of £5 during the life of Eleanor. (fn. 45) From this date the manor followed almost exactly the descent of Shipton Bellinger (fn. 46) (q.v.) until 1466, when Robert Bodenham died seised only of the reversion of the manor. This right passed to his infant grandson and heir Richard, son of his son Robert, (fn. 47) who as soon as he came into possession evidently sold the manor, probably to pay his grandfather's debts, to Tristram Fauntleroy, (fn. 48) a younger son of the Dorset family of that name. Tristram died in 1538, leaving a son and heir Brian, (fn. 49) whose son Henry held the manor until his death in 1578. (fn. 50) His heir was his son William, (fn. 51) who evidently died in a few years without issue, since his brother Henry was returned as the heir of his father Henry in 1589. (fn. 52) From this date the descent of the manor is unknown until the beginning of the 18th century, when it was in the possession of Richard Bird. Elizabeth, daughter and heir of Richard, brought Snoddington in marriage to Ralph Etwall of Andover, and the manor continued in the Etwall family until 1885. when Mr. William Etwall sold it to Mr. William H. Alexander. (fn. 53) The latter dying in 1905 devised the manor by will to Mr. H. C. Formby, B.A., J.P., the present owner. (fn. 54)
