= John Storm =

John Storm(e) may refer to:

- John Brutzman Storm, Pennsylvania politician
- John Storme, English Member of the Parliament of England
