= Mary Harvey (disambiguation) =

Mary Harvey (born 1965) is an American soccer goalkeeper.

Mary Harvey may also refer to:

- Lady Mary Dering (née Harvey, 1629–1704), English composer
- Mary Harvey Pierce (1821–1847), American wife of religious leader Brigham Young

== See also ==
- Mary Hervey (c. 1700–1768), English maid of honour
- Mary-Sophie Harvey (born 1999), Canadian swimmer
