= Martin French =

Martin French may refer to:

- Martin French (mayor), Mayor of Galway in 1579–1580
- Martin French (MP), for Hythe 1407–1410
