= Canoun =

Canoun is a surname. Notable people with the surname include:

- Hugh Canoun (died 1317/1318), English-born judge in Ireland
- William Canoun (fl. 1411–1414), English Member of Parliament
