= Edward Brockman =

Edward Brockman may refer to:

- Edward Lewis Brockman (1865–1943), chief secretary to the Federated Malay States
- Edward Drake Brockman (1793–1858), British barrister and politician
