= Hughelot =

Hughelot is a surname. Notable people with the surname include:

- John Hughelot, MP for Weymouth and Melcombe Regis (UK Parliament constituency)
- William Hughelot, MP for Hythe
