= Hercules Baker =

- Born: 1683
- Died: 1744 (aged 60–61)
- Occupation: Royal Navy officer Politician Statesman

Hercules Baker (1683–1744), of Deal and East Langdon, Kent, was a Royal Navy officer and politician who sat in the House of Commons from 1722 to 1744.

Baker was baptized on 15 August 1683, the second son of James Baker of Deal, a mariner, and his wife Amy Mullett of Deal. He joined the Royal Navy and was a captain in 1713. He married Jane Fox under a licence obtained on 9 May 1713. In 1715 he was serving in the Mediterranean under his uncle, Admiral John Baker, to whose property he succeeded in 1716.

Baker was returned unopposed as Member of Parliament for Hythe at the 1722 general election. He voted with the Government in every recorded division. He was re-elected for Hythe in a contest at the 1727 general election and was returned unopposed in 1734. In 1736 he was appointed treasurer of Greenwich Hospital and held the post for the rest of his life. He was returned unopposed at the 1741 general election. In 1744 he was disappointed at being passed over for promotion to flag rank and considered resigning his place at Greenwich, but did not.

Baker died on 1 November 1744 leaving a daughter.

Parliament of Great Britain
Preceded by Jacob des Bouverie; Sir Samuel Lennard	Member of Parliament for Hythe; 1722–1744; With: Sir Samuel Lennard 1722-1728; William Glanville 1728-1744	Succeeded by Thomas Hales; William Glanville
