= Boteler baronets =

Extinct baronetcies in England

There have been three baronetcies created for persons with the surname Boteler, all in the Baronetage of England. All three creations are extinct.

The Boteler Baronetcy, of Hatfield Woodhall in the County of Hertford, was created in the Baronetage of England on 12 April 1620. For more information on this creation, see Baron Boteler.

The Boteler Baronetcy, of Barham Court, Teston, in the County of Kent, was created in the Baronetage of England on 3 July 1641 for William Boteler. He was killed in action three years later at the Battle of Cropredy Bridge. The third Baronet sat as member of parliament for Hythe. The title became extinct on the death of the fourth Baronet in 1771.

The Boteler Baronetcy, of Bramfield in the County of Hertford, was created in the Baronetage of England on 7 December 1643 for George Boteler. He was the half-brother of the first Baronet of the 1620 creation. The title became extinct on his death in 1657.

== Boteler baronets, of Hatfield Woodhall (1620) ==
- see Baron Boteler

== Boteler baronets, of Barham Court (1641) ==
- Sir William Boteler, 1st Baronet (died 1644)
- Sir Oliver Boteler, 2nd Baronet (c. 1637–1689)
- Sir Philip Boteler, 3rd Baronet (c. 1667–1719)
- Sir Philip Boteler, 4th Baronet (c. 1695–1772)

== Boteler baronets, of Bramfield (1643) ==
- Sir George Boteler, 1st Baronet (c. 1583–1657)
