= Thomas Keys =

Thomas Keys or Keyes may refer to:

- Thomas Keys (husband of Lady Mary Grey), Royal Gatekeeper to Elizabeth I of England
- Thomas Keys Residence, house in Minnesota, USA, built in 1950
- Thomas Keys (MP) for Hythe

== See also ==
- Thomas Hewitt Key, English scholar
