= William Sammes (judge) =

Judge of the Admiralty court of England and Wales
- In office 1644–1646
- Monarchs: Charles I; Interregnum
- Preceded by: Richard Zouch
- Succeeded by: William Clark; John Exton

Personal details
- Died: October 1646
- Resting place: St Benet's, Paul's Wharf
- Education: Trinity Hall, Cambridge

William Sammes (died 1646) was an English lawyer and Judge of the High Court of Admiralty.

He was awarded the degree of Legum Doctor from Trinity Hall, Cambridge in 1595 and spent the next four decades in private legal practice, until the outbreak of the First English Civil War in the early 1640s. In 1643 the sole Admiralty Court judge, Richard Zouch, was dismissed from office by Oliver Cromwell on suspicion of being a Royalist sympathiser. Cromwell's Lord High Admiral, Robert Rich, appointed Sammes as "acting Judge" in Zouch's place, and confirmed him as the permanent officeholder in 1644.

Sammes held office until his death in October 1646. He was buried at St Benet's Church, Paul's Wharf.
