= William Sammes =

William Sammes may refer to:

- William Sammes (politician), mayor of Lincoln, 1515–1516
- William Sammes (judge) (died 1646), English judge
