= John Loch =

John Loch (8 September 1781 – 19 February 1868) was a Member of Parliament for Hythe and Chairman of the East India Company.

He was the second son of George Loch (d. 1786) of Drylaw, Edinburgh.

He joined the marine service of the East India company and also served as a volunteer with the Royal Navy. In 1800 he served on Lord St. Vincent's flagship during the blockade of Brest and later that year was in the unsuccessful Ferrol expedition as aide-de-camp to Sir Edward Pellew, one of the British commanders. He made his fortune trading with China and in 1821 was elected a Director of the East India Company, a position he held until 1854, acting as chairman in 1829 and 1833. In 1837 he was attacked and stabbed by a disgruntled former employee of the company, who subsequently committed suicide whilst in custody.

In 1830 he was returned as Member of Parliament for Hythe along with Stewart Marjoribanks (brother of East India Company Chairman Campbell Marjoribanks), serving until the constituency's representation was reduced to one member in the Reform Act 1832.

He died at Bushey Grove, Hertfordshire in February 1868 aged 86. He had married Rabina Marion, the daughter of Archibald Cullen of Middlesex, with whom he had a son and a daughter. The son George also joined the navy but died of fever at Martinique in 1848. His daughter Marion Finella married Edward Marjoribanks, nephew of the MP.

Parliament of the United Kingdom
Preceded by Sir Robert Townsend-Farquhar	Member of Parliament for Hythe; 1830–1832; With: Stewart Marjoribanks	Succeeded by Stewart Marjoribanks
