= William Knight (died 1622) =

English Member of Parliament

William Knight (died 1622), of Hythe, Kent, was an English Member of Parliament (MP).

He was a Member of the Parliament of England for Hythe in 1601. He was Mayor of Hythe in 1601.
