= John Stephenson (MP for Hythe) =

English Member of Parliament

John Stephenson, Stephens or Stevens (fl. 1571), was an English Member of Parliament (MP).

He was a Member of the Parliament of England for Hythe in 1571.
