= John Leigh (MP for Hythe) =

English Member of Parliament

John Leigh (? - 1432 or after), was an English Member of Parliament (MP).

He was a Member of the Parliament of England for Hythe in May 1421, 1431 and 1432. The last record of him is from 1432.
