= Alexander Appleford (MP) =

English Member of Parliament

Alexander Appleford (born c. 1355), of Hythe and Ashford, Kent, was an English Member of Parliament (MP).

He was a Member of the Parliament of England for Hythe in 1399, 1402, 1410 and 1420.
