= Sir Philip Boteler, 3rd Baronet =

English Member of Parliament

Sir Philip Boteler, 3rd Baronet (c. 1667–1719), of Berham Court, Teston, Kent, was an English Member of Parliament (MP).

He was a Member of the Parliament of England for Hythe 1690–1708. He was Mayor of Hythe 1698–1699. He was one of the Boteler baronets.
