= John Overhaven =

English Member of Parliament

John Overhaven (died c. 1444), of Hythe, Kent, was an English Member of Parliament (MP). He was a Member of the Parliament of England for Hythe in 1420, December 1421, 1422, 1426, 1429, 1435 and 1442.
