= William Brockman (MP) =

English Member of Parliament

William Brockman (c. 1658 – by 1742), of Beachborough, Kent, was an English Member of Parliament (MP). He was a Member of the Parliament of England for Hythe 1690 to 1695.
