= Henry Browning =

14th-century English politician

Henry Browning (died c. 1411), of Hythe, Kent, was an English politician.

== Family ==
Browning married a woman named Christine, who outlived him. They had one known child, Margery. Margery married John Smallwode at some point before 1414, who in 1397 had allegedly plotted her father's death.

== Career ==
He was a Member (MP) of the Parliament of England for Hythe in 1368, 1372, 1378, May 1382, February 1383, 1385, 1386, January 1390 and 1391.
