= William Baddell =

English Member of Parliament (died 1570s)

William Baddell (by 1523–1572/1573), of Hythe, Kent, was an English Member of Parliament (MP).

He was a Member of the Parliament of England for Hythe in 1547 and 1559.
