= William Glanville (Hythe MP) =

William Glanville (c.1686–1766), of St Clere, Kent was a British politician who sat in the House of Commons for 38 years from 1728 to 1766.

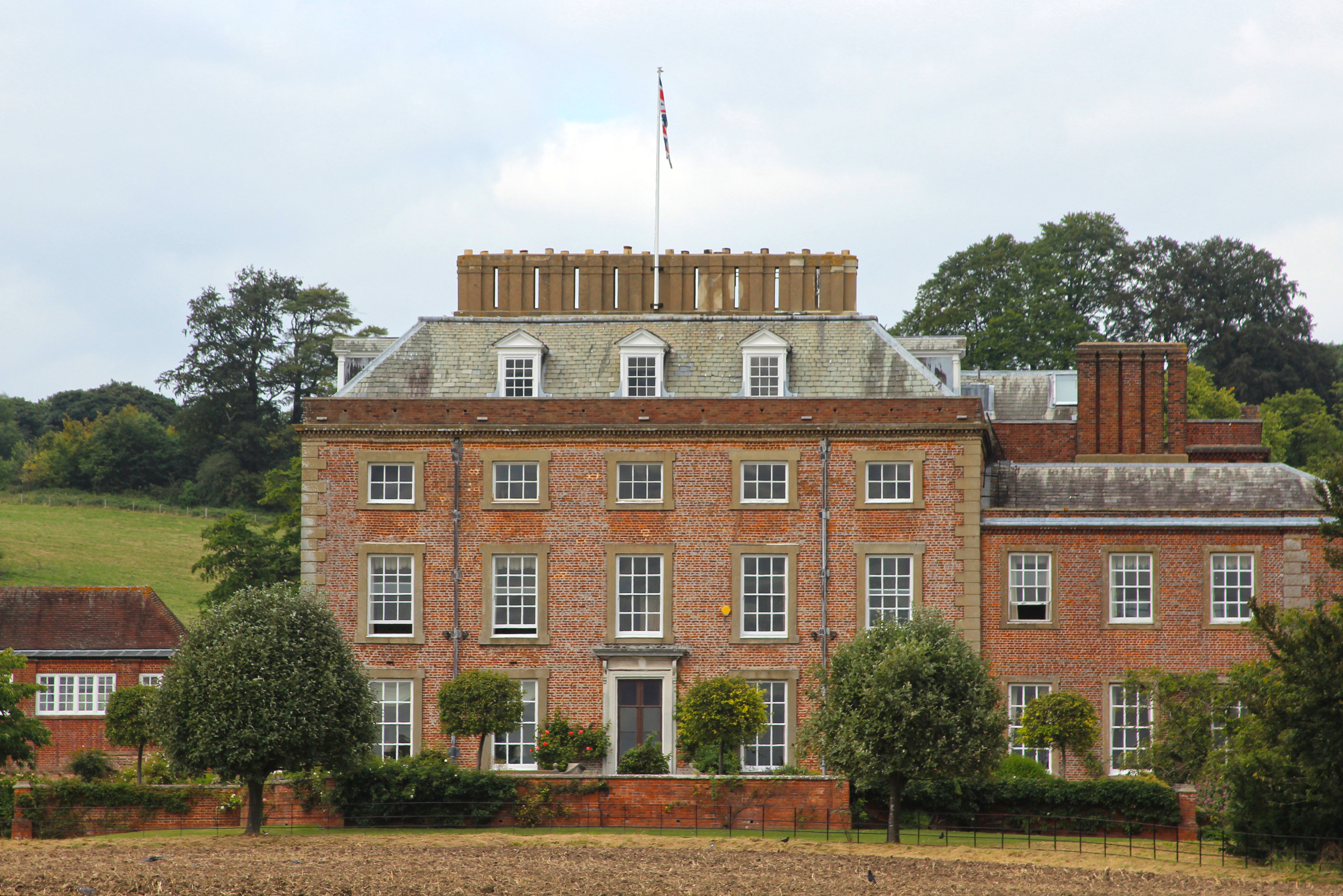
St Clere, Kent

Glanville was born William Evelyn, the fifth son of George Evelyn, MP of Nutfield, Surrey and his third wife Frances Bromehall, daughter of Andrew Bromehall of Stoke Newington, Middlesex. He married Frances Glanville daughter of William Glanville, MP in about 1718 and the took name of Glanville. She died in 1719. He married as his second wife before 1733, Bridget Raymond, daughter of Hugh Raymond of Langley, Kent.

Glanville contested Bletchingley unsuccessfully on the death of his elder brother George Evelyn in 1724. He was returned by the Duke of Dorset as Member of Parliament for Hythe at a by-election on 22 February 1728. He voted regularly with the administration, and became a member of the 1729 gaols committee of the House of Commons. In 1730 he introduced a bill for enabling civil cases to be finally decided at the assizes. He opposed a petition sponsored by Sir John Barnard for terminating the monopoly of the East India Company, describing it as 'a pickpocket petition', and he piloted through the Commons the Quakers' tithe bill, which was thrown out by the Lords. In 1731 he supported a bill for enabling unenumerated goods to come direct from the plantations to Ireland instead of via England. In 1732 he spoke in favour of the bill for voiding the sale of the Derwentwater estates. In 1733 he defended Sir Robert Sutton and unsuccessfully opposed a bill for preventing 'the pernicious practice of stock-jobbing'. In 1734 he opposed a bill for enforcing the land qualification for Members. He was returned at the 1734 British general election. In 1735, he was made a Commissioner of Irish revenue. He was returned again at the 1741. His post as Commissioner of Irish Revenue became inconsistent with a seat in Parliament under the Place Act 1742 and he surrendered it in 1747 to a friend, who paid him half the income. He was returned again as MP for Hythe at the 1747 British general election.

There is little record of Glanville after 1754 British general election and after the 1761 British general election he does not appear in any division list. He represented Hythe for nearly 40 years, in spite of complaints that he failed to make gifts ‘for the public good of the town’.

Glanville died on 19 October 1766. He had one daughter Frances, who married Admiral Edward Boscawen, by his first wife Frances. He had two sons and three daughters by his second wife Bridget. Their son William Evelyn was MP for Hythe. Their daughter Sarah married Chase Price. .

Parliament of Great Britain
Preceded by Captain Hercules Baker; Sir Samuel Lennard	Member of Parliament for Hythe; British general election 1728–1766 British general election With: Captain Hercules Baker (Sir) Thomas Hales 1744; Lord George Sackville 1761	Succeeded by Lord George Sackville; William Amherst
