= Walter Fisher (MP) =

Walter Fisher (fl. 1380s), of Hythe, Kent, was an English Member of Parliament (MP).

He was a Member of the Parliament of England for Hythe in October 1382 and September 1388.
