= Christopher Toldervey =

English Member of Parliament

Christopher Toldervey (? - 1613), of Allhallows, Lombard Street, London, was an English Member of Parliament (MP) and merchant.

He was a Member of the Parliament of England for Hythe in 1597, 1601 and 1604.
