= Thomas Casebourne =

Thomas Casebourne (fl. 1402–1413), of Hythe, Kent, was an English Member of Parliament (MP).

He was a Member of the Parliament of England for Hythe in 1402, 1406 and May 1413.
