= John Skinner (MP for Hythe) =

English Member of Parliament

John Skinner (? - 1432 or after) of Hythe, Kent, was an English Member of Parliament (MP) and trader.

He was a Member of the Parliament of England for Hythe in 1419, 1423, 1425 and 1427. The last recorded mention of him is from 1432.

Little is known about him.
