= Robert Townsend Farquhar =

British Member of Parliament

Sir Robert Townsend Farquhar, 1st Baronet (1776 – 16 March 1830) was an influential British merchant of the early nineteenth century who served as a colonial governor and Member of Parliament. During his lengthy service for both the East India Company and the British government, Farquhar gained a reputation as an efficient and ambitious administrator and he notably served as Lieutenant-Governor of Prince of Wales Island (Penang Island) from January 1804 to 1805 and as governor of Île de Bourbon, now known as Réunion from 1810 to 1811.

He was the 1st Governor of Mauritius from 4 December 1810 to 20 May 1823. During his tenure on Mauritius, Farquhar became well known for his operations against French slave traders, having previously investigated the possibility of replacing slaves with paid Chinese labourers. After returning to Britain, Farquhar, who was made a baronet in 1821, sat in Parliament for Newton and later for Hythe.

== Early life ==
In 1787, at the age of 11, Farquhar joined Westminster School. He then took up the study of book-keeping under James Pierson of Castle Street. After this he joined the East India Company.

== Career summary ==
Sources:

- 1795 – 1796: E.I.C.: Writer at Madras
- 1796 – 1797: E.I.C: Assistant Under-Accountant to the Board of Revenue
- 1797 – 1798: E.I.C: Assistant Under-Resident, Amboyna and Banda, and Dutch Translator to the Expedition under Admiral Eamier
- 1798 – 1798: E.I.C.: Deputy Commercial Resident, Amboyna and Banda, and Dutch Interpreter
- 1798 – 1802: E.I.C.: Commercial Resident, Amboyna and Banda
- 1802 – 1804: Commissioner for Adjusting British Claims at Moluccas
- 1804 – 1805: E.I.C.: Lieutenant-Governor, Prince of Wales' Island (Penang)
- 1806 – 1806: Departed Penang, returned to England
- 1807 – 1807: Stood for Canterbury during the General Election (lost); published 'Suggestions for supplying the West Indian colonies with labourers from China; failed attempt to re-secure the Governorship of Penang
- 1810 – 1811: E.I.C.: Interim Administrator of (Bourbon, 8 Jul. '10) and Mauritius (6 Dec. '10)
- 1811 – 1817: E.I.C.: Governor of Mauritius (18 March onwards)
- 1817 – 1820: Leave of absence (from November 1817)
- 1820 – 1823: E.I.C.: Governor of Mauritius (arrived London Sep. '23)
- 1823 – 1823: Declared Candidacy for Vacant E.I.C. Dir. chair (failed)
- 1825 – 1826: M.P. for Newton
- 1826 – 1828: Director of the Hon. the East India Company
- 1826 – 1830: M.P. for Hythe (Kent)

== E. I. C. Amboyna ==
Farquhar rose rapidly in the company and by the late 1790s was the commercial resident in Amboyna, a former Dutch colony seized during the French Revolutionary Wars.

Farquhar concluded treaties of Alliance and Commerce with the Sultans of Tidore (12 November 1801), Ternate (23 November 1801) and Batchian (30 January 1802), all of which the Madras Government dissolved. None of them are mentioned in Aitchison's "A Collection of Treaties, Engagements, and Sanads relating to India and neighbouring Countries," and can only be found at the National Archives (U.K., Ref. No. IOR/H/635).

In 1802, at the Peace of Amiens, Farquhar was charged with assessing British claims on the colony as it was returned to the Batavian Republic.

During his time at Amboyna, Farquhar earned the Governor of Madras' displeasure by exceeding his brief in initiating a successful attack on the Dutch settlement of Ternate after the outbreak of the Napoleonic Wars. Demoted and sent back to London, Farquhar submitted his resignation together with a strongly worded letter of vindication to the Governor-General, Lord Wellesley. Impressed with Farquhar's initiative and direct approach, Wellesley offered him the governorship of Penang.

== E. I.C. Lieutenant-Governor, Penang ==
During his administration at Penang, Farquhar began public works activities to improve roads, water supply and the fortification of the settlement. Farquhar Street in Penang is named after him. Farquhar was responsible for the reconstruction of Fort Cornwallis at a cost of $80,000.

On 1 January 1804, Farquhar succeeded Sir George Alexander William Leith, as Lieutenant-Governor of Penang. Almost immediately upon assuming his new role, Farquhar began submitting a great many schemes for the improvement of the island, to his East India Company superiors in Bengal, which some have said, were near-impossible. These included turning Pulau Jerejak into a dock for building and refitting ships, buying a great deal of timber from Siam for that purpose; and a highly involved, complex and detailed plan to supply George Town with water from the waterfall gardens using a long brick channel, employing a hundred convicts to cut the canal, construct the aqueduct, lay earthenware pipes through the streets and tin pipes to conduct water to houses.

Farquhar worked out and submitted a long report ending with an estimate of $648,000 profit against an initial expenditure of $28,000, derived from taxing the public and shipping representatives for the use of the water, and from a 'money-exchange' revenue farm, at $4,000 a year. His plan to bring good, clean water into town was approved but the Board of Directors cautioned that the aqueduct would be better if made of clay to avoid disorganising the entire system in the event a brick or two became dislodged. The idea of taxing the company's own ships, it was felt, was unusual and it was noted that these had always enjoyed free water in the past, and instructed this to be removed from the revenue estimates. They further noted that it was unlikely for Malays, Chinese and other inhabitants of George Town to avail themselves of the channelled water owing to the presence of a good well in town, sufficient to their needs. The final nail in the coffin came when they asserted that taxation ought to be kept as low as it could to encourage settlers to come to the island.

It was said that no other governor of Penang had deluded the Government of India into incurring the expense of practically worthless project than Farquhar, aided as he was, by what has been referred to as "his extraordinary system of book-keeping," that resulted in his short term being referred to as "The Age of Humbug."

In one instance, the return of trade showed 2,000 tons of black pepper exported without any drain on the Island, and the settlement's daily increase in "population and elegance", apparently bringing Penang neck-and-neck with the Acheen in the pepper trade race. Buoyed by this and other indicators of prosperity he provided to them, the Court of Directors in London decided to promote Penang to become India's 4th Presidency (after Bengal, Madras and Bombay). Philip Dundas was appointed to succeed Farquhar, and arrived with a large staff including three Council members, a Secretary, a Deputy Secretary (Stamford Raffles), a staff of writers, with their wives and dependants, aboard the Ganges, on 18 September 1805. Not having been consulted, the residents, surprised, wondered where the revenue would come from to pay for all of this additional overhead.

He has been called reckless. Christopher Smith, originally appointed as Botanist to explore the spice market (p 7/34), was in 1805, appointed Superintendent of the Botanic Gardens (1805–1806). He accumulated 71,266 nutmeg plants, 55,263 clove plants, as well as Canary Nut and Sugar Palm specimens, all of which Farquhar sold for $9,656, immediately upon the sudden death of Smith, shortly after his appointment to the Gardens.

== Denouncing slavery ==
Farquhar became interested in the labour problems that rose from the abolition of the slave trade in 1807, and published a scheme to replace African slaves with paid Chinese labourers entitled "Suggestions for counteracting any injurious effects upon the population of the West India colonies from the abolition of the slave trade", although the idea did not gain widespread support.

== Bourbon and Mauritius ==
In July 1810, Farquhar was ordered to accompany the fleet under Commodore Josias Rowley that was to invade the French colony of Île Bonaparte, known today as Réunion. The attack was successful and Farquhar remained on the island as governor, moving to Mauritius in December 1810 after a successful invasion of the island under Admiral Albemarle Bertie

During his time as governor of the Indian Ocean islands, Farquhar had extensive maritime charts made of the region and encouraged trade with Madagascar and Mozambique, occasionally with disastrous results for the traders involved. He also made significant military and diplomatic efforts to end the East African slave trade, aggressively deploying naval units against the French ships that carried the slaves and conducting treaties with Madagascar and Muscat.

Farquhar remained Governor on Mauritius for 13 years (although he took a leave of absence between 1817 and 1820) He resigned from the post in 1823 and returned to Britain.

== Parliamentarian ==
On 11 February 1825, Farquhar became Member of Parliament for Newton. He was Member for Hythe from 1826 (9 June) till his death in 1830 (succeeded by John Lock on 26 March).

== Baronetcy ==
From letters patent under the Great Seal of the United Kingdom of Great Britain and Ireland, Robert Townsend Farquhar (Governor and Commander in Chief in and over the Island of Mauritius) and his lawful male heirs, were granted the dignity of Baronet on 27 July 1821.

== Family ==
Farquhar was born Robert Townsend Farquhar, on 14 October 1776, the second son of Walter Farquhar (1738 – 1819), an eminent Scottish physician, and his wife Anne (Stevenson) Harvie. When baptized on 11 November 1776 at St. James Piccadilly, he was called Robert Townsend Farquhar. To differentiate himself from his brother who was also a baronet, he legally combined his middle and last names with Townsend to be placed before Farquhar, on 19 July 1824, although he had begun using that name (Townsend) earlier on.

His elder brother was Sir Thomas Harvie Farquhar, 2nd bart. (1775–1836), and his younger, Walter Farquhar. He had four sisters who survived him. On 10 January 1809, he married Maria Frances Geslip de Lautour. His only legitimate son was Sir Walter Townsend-Farquhar, 2nd Baronet (1809–66). His bastard son was Walter Farquhar Fullerton. In his will, he provided £500 for one George Harrison, ‘whom I have taken under my protection and educated’.

== Demise ==
Robert Townsend Farquhar died at his home, Richmond Terrace, Whitehall, London, on 16 March 1830, seven months shy of his 54th birthday.

At the time of his death he was a member of the board of directors of the East India Company, on which he had served on and off, by rotation, through the years since 1 March 1826; the Alliance British and Foreign Life and Fire Assurance Company; and member of Parliament for Hythe.

He had been a director of the Australian Agricultural Company, a member of the Royal Society, and was an Honorary Life Governor of the African Institution.

== Legacy ==
=== Places ===
Farquhar Street, a major thoroughfare in the city of George Town in Penang, is named after him, as are the Farquhar Islands, which are part of The Seychelles and are situated 100 miles north of Mauritius.

=== In fiction ===
He was depicted by Patrick O'Brian in the Mauritius Command as a competent political man, working well with the British military (army and navy) as well as with the local people being taken over by Britain.

Government offices
Preceded by George Leith	Lieutenant Governor of Penang; 1804–1805	Succeeded by Philip Dundas
Preceded by Chrysostôme de Sainte-Suzanne (as Governor of Île Bonaparte)	Governor of Bourbon; 1810	Succeeded by Henry Keating
Preceded by Charles Decaen (as Governor of Isle de France)	Governor of Mauritius; 1810–1823	Succeeded by Sir Galbraith Lowry Cole
Parliament of the United Kingdom
Preceded by Thomas Claughton; Thomas Legh	Member of Parliament for Newton; 1825–1826; With: Thomas Legh	Succeeded by Thomas Alcock; Thomas Legh
Preceded by Samuel Jones-Loyd; Stewart Marjoribanks	Member of Parliament for Hythe; 1826–1830; With: Stewart Marjoribanks	Succeeded by John Loch; Stewart Marjoribanks
Baronetage of the United Kingdom
New creation	Baronet (of Mauritius); 1821–1830	Succeeded by Walter Townsend Farquhar
