= John Hull (MP for Hythe) =

English Member of Parliament

John Hull (by 1479–1540 or later), of Hythe, Kent, was an English Member of Parliament (MP), and a wool and cloth merchant.

He was a Member of the Parliament of England for Hythe in 1529 and perhaps in 1536. For the next Parliament, in 1539, the members for Hythe are unrecorded.

Parliament of England
Preceded by unrecorded unrecorded	Member of Parliament for Hythe; 1529; With: Stephen Harry	Succeeded by unrecorded (possibly still John Hull) unrecorded (possibly still Stephen Harry)
