= Judge of the High Court of Admiralty =

Historical position, British Royal Navy

Office of the Judge of the High Court of Admiralty
- Ensign of the Royal Navy
- Judicial Department
- Reports to: First Lord of the Admiralty
- Nominator: First Lord of the Admiralty
- Appointer: Prime Minister; Subject to formal approval by the Queen-in-Council
- Term length: Not fixed
- Inaugural holder: William Lacy, LL.B.
- Formation: 1483-1875

The Judge of the High Court of Admiralty was established in 1483 he was the chief law officer of the High Court of Admiralty. The office holder was supported by various officials and existed until 1875.

== History ==
The High Court of Admiralty was created as a separate court following the Battle of Sluys in 1340. In the following century, it was administered by the Vice-Admiral of England who was the deputy of the Lord High Admiral who acted as the court's judge. The High Court of Admiralty absorbed the jurisdiction duties of the separate admiralty courts of the admirals of the north, south and west by 1414. In 1483, it was decided to establish a distinct office separate from that of the Vice-Admiral of England, thus relieving him from one of his responsibilities. Until the resignation of the Duke of York in 1673, the Judge of the High Court of Admiralty was appointed by the Lord High Admiral by letters patent. From 1673, appointments were granted by the monarch and confirmed by letters patent. There was one exception to this rule: in 1714, Judge Henchman was appointed by the Board of Admiralty. Between the years 1694 to 1707, he was a member of the Privy Council of England and until 1714 the Privy Council of Great Britain. In all, there were forty Judges of the High Court of Admiralty appointed (some served more than once) from 1483 until 1875, when the court itself was abolished thus bringing to an end nearly 400 years of history. The office holder was part of the admiralty's Judicial Department.

== Office holders ==
=== Judges of the High Court of Admiralty ===
Included:

1. 1483-1490, William Lacy, LL.B.
2. 1490-1514, Robert Rydon LL.B.
3. 1514-1524, Christopher Middleton, LL.B.
4. 1524-1536, Sir. John Tregonwell D.C.L.
5. 1536-1542 Anthony Hussey sitting for Sir John Tregonwell as Deputy Judge
6. 1542-1549, Sir. John Tregonwell D.C.L
7. 1549, January–October, Richard Lyell, D.C.L.
8. 1549-1554, Griffith or (Griffin) Leyson, D.C.L.
9. 1554-1558, William Cooke or (Coke), D.C.L.
10. 1558-1574 David Lewis, D.C.L.
11. 1575-1584 David Lewis, D.C.L. and John Harbert or (Herbert) B.C.L. (jointly)
12. 1584-1589 Sir Julius Caesar D.C.L. and Valentine Dale, D.C.L. (jointly) Dale died in 1589
13. 1589-1605, Sir Julius Caesar D.C.L.
14. 1605-1608, Sir Thomas Crompton, D.C.L.
15. 1608-1617, Sir Daniel Dun or (Donne), D.C.L.
16. 1614-1617 Sir Richard Trevor or (Trever), D.C.L.
17. 1617-1641, Sir Henry Marten, D.C.L.
18. 1641-1643, Richard Zouche, D.C.L.
19. 1644-1647, William Sammes, L.L.D.
20. 1647-1648, William Clark, L.L.D.
21. 1648-1651 John Exton, Isaac Dorislaus L.L.D and William Clark (jointly)
22. 1652-1653, William Stephens or (Steevens)
23. 1653-1654, Nathaniel Bacon
24. 1654-1655, John Godolphin and William Clark, L.L.D. (jointly)
25. 1655-1658, Charles George Cock and John Godolphin (jointly)
26. 1659-1660 William Turner, D.C.L.
27. 1660-1661, Thomas Hyde, L.L.D.
28. 1661, February–March, Richard Zouche, D.C.L.
29. 1661, March–October, Thomas Hyde
30. 1661-1668, John Exton, L.L.D
31. 1668-1685, Leoline Jenkins, D.C.L
32. 1685-1686, Sir. Richard Lloyd, D.C.L.
33. 1686, July–December. Sir. Thomas Exton, L.L.D
34. 1686-1689, Sir. Richard Raines, L.L.D
35. 1689-1714, Sir. Charles Hedges, D.C.L
36. 1714, June–December, Humphrey Henchman, D.C.L
37. 1714-1715, Sir Henry Newton, D.C.L
38. 1715-1751, Sir. Henry Penrice, L.L.D.
39. 1751-1773, Sir. Thomas Salusbury, L.L.D,
40. 1773-1778, Sir George Hay, D.C.L.
41. 1778-1798, Sir. James Marriott, L.L.D
42. 1798-1828, Sir. William Scott, D.C.L.
43. 1828-1833, Sir. Christopher Robinson, D.C.L.
44. 1833-1838, Sir. John Nicholl, D.C.L.
45. 1838-1867, The Right Hon: Stephen Lushington, D.C.L.
46. 1867-1875, Sir. Robert Joseph Phillimore (Bart), D.C.L.

== Sources ==
1. Admiralty court, in Office-Holders in Modern Britain: Volume 4, Admiralty Officials 1660-1870, ed. J C Sainty (London, 1975), pp. 95–99. British History Online http://www.british-history.ac.uk/office-holders/vol4/pp95-99 [accessed 5 January 2019].
2. Archives, National (1450–1995). "Records of the High Court of Admiralty and colonial Vice-Admiralty courts". The National Archives. HCA.
3. Sainty, J.C. (1975). Office-Holders in Modern Britain: Volume 4, Admiralty Officials 1660-1870. London: University of London.
4. Senior, William (1927). "The JUDGES of the HIGH COURT of ADMIRALTY". The Mariner's Mirror. 13 (4): 333–347. doi:10.1080/00253359.1927.10655437.
