= Thomas Bromlegh =

English Member of Parliament

Thomas Bromlegh (died 1422 or after) also known as Barbour, was an English Member of Parliament (MP).

He was a Member of the Parliament of England for Hythe in May 1421. The last record of him is from 1422.
