= John Collins (died 1597) =

English Member of Parliament

John Collins (died 1597), of Hythe and Warehorne, Kent, was an English Member of Parliament (MP).

He was a Member of the Parliament of England for Hythe in 1589 and 1593.
