= Ralph Haselhurst =

English Member of Parliament

Ralph Haselhurst (fl. 1559), of Hythe, Kent, was an English Member of Parliament (MP).

He was a Member of the Parliament of England for Hythe in 1559.
