= Peter Hayman =

Peter Hayman may refer to:

- Peter Hayman (ornithologist) (1930–2025), British ornithologist and illustrator
- Peter Hayman (diplomat) (1914–1992), British diplomat and intelligence operative

== See also ==
- Peter Heyman (disambiguation)
