= Sir Thomas Hales, 3rd Baronet =

English politician (c. 1695–1762)

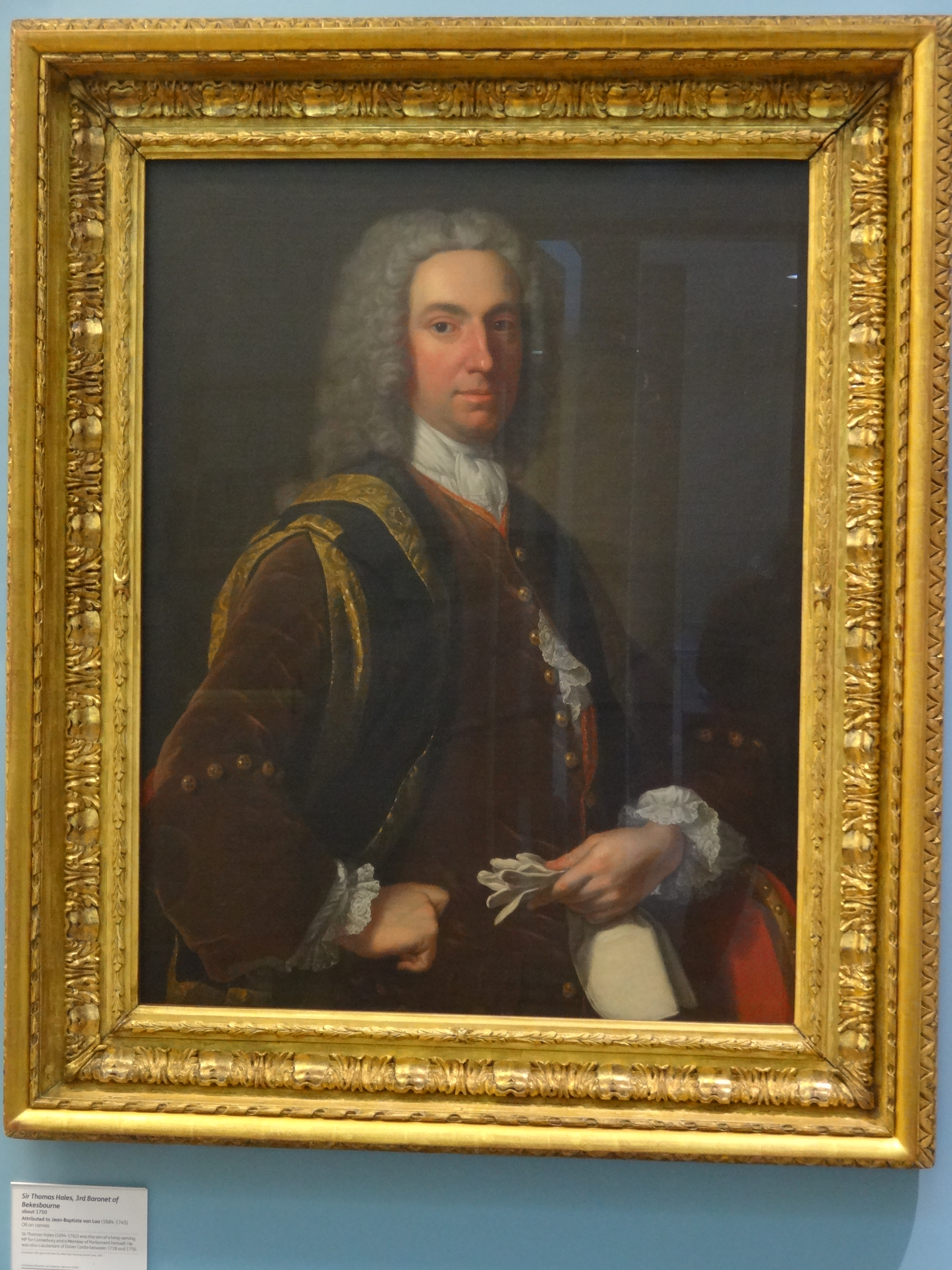
Thomas Hales circa 1750, attributed to Jean-Baptiste van Loo

Sir Thomas Hales, 3rd Baronet (c. 1695 – October 1762), of Beakesbourne in Kent, was an English courtier and Whig politician who sat in the House of Commons for 37 years between 1722 and 1762.

Hales was the eldest son of Sir Thomas Hales, 2nd Baronet, of Brymore, and his wife Mary Pym, daughter of Sir Charles Pym, 1st Baronet of Brymore. He matriculated at Oriel College, Oxford in 1711 and was admitted at the Inner Temple. He succeeded his father as 3rd Baronet on 7 January 1748.

Hales entered Parliament at the 1722 British general election as Whig Member of Parliament for Minehead, being a member of the Duke of Dorset's faction and supporting the Walpole and Pelham governments. He subsequently also represented Camelford, Grampound, Hythe and East Grinstead, being an MP for most of the last forty years of his life.

The only break in his Parliamentary career came in 1741: at the notoriously corrupt rotten borough of Grampound, his opponents had contrived a disagreement over who was the rightful Mayor and therefore returning officer for the constituency. According to their Mayor, Hales and his pro-government colleague Thomas Trefusis were re-elected by 35 votes to 17; however, his opponents had arranged for the Sheriff to direct the writ for the election to their own nominee, so it was his version of the result (declaring Hales and Trefusis defeated by 27 to 23) which was returned to Parliament. Hales and Trefusis initially petitioned against this outcome, but withdrew their protest before a decision had been reached. Hales returned to the Commons at a by-election for Hythe three years later.

Hales held the lucrative post of Clerk of the Board of Green Cloth to the Prince of Wales from about 1719 until 1727, and to the King from his accession in 1727 until 1760. He was also Lieutenant of Dover Castle from 1728 to 1750 and Vice-Warden of the Cinque Ports from 1750 until his death. On the accession of George III in 1760 he lost his posts in the Royal Household, and successfully applied to Prime Minister Newcastle for a pension in recompense, although he was granted only £600 a year in place of the £800 he had asked for.

Hales died in 1762. He had married Mary Marsham (1698–1769), daughter of Sir Robert Marsham of the Mote, in 1723, and their children included:

- Sir Thomas Pym Hales (c. 1726–1773), who succeeded to the baronetcy
- Sir Philip Hales (died 1824)
- Mary Hales, who married Charles Moss (1711–1802), Bishop of Bath and Wells
- Anne Hales (1736–1795), who married (first) Lord Feversham (died 1763) and (second) The Earl of Radnor (1725–1776)
- Margaretta Hales, who married Samuel Pechell of Richmond

Parliament of Great Britain
Preceded by Robert Mansel; Sir John Trevelyan	Member of Parliament for Minehead; 1722–1727; With: Robert Mansel 1722–23; Francis Whitworth 1723–27	Succeeded by Francis Whitworth; Alexander Luttrell
Preceded by The Earl of Drogheda; William Sloper	Member of Parliament for Camelford; 1727–1734; With: John Pitt	Succeeded by Sir Thomas Lyttelton; James Cholmondeley
Preceded by Philip Hawkins; Isaac le Heup	Member of Parliament for Grampound; 1734–1741; With: Philip Hawkins 1734–39; Thomas Trefusis 1739–41	Succeeded by Daniel Boone; William Banks
Preceded by William Glanville; Captain Hercules Baker	Member of Parliament for Hythe; 1744–1761; With: William Glanville	Succeeded by William Glanville; Lord George Sackville
Preceded by Earl of Middlesex; Lord George Sackville	Member of Parliament for East Grinstead; 1761–1762; With: Earl of Middlesex	Succeeded by Earl of Middlesex; John Irwin
Baronetage of England
Preceded by Thomas Hales	Baronet (of Beakesbourne); 1748–1762	Succeeded by Thomas Pym Hales
