= Thomas Canterbury =

Thomas Canterbury (died 1412/13), of Hythe, Kent, was an English Member of Parliament (MP).

He was a Member of the Parliament of England for Hythe in 1399.
