= Henry Fane (died 1596) =

English Member of Parliament

Henry Fane (1560-1596), of Hadlow, Kent, was an English Member of Parliament (MP).

He was a Member of the Parliament of England for Hythe in 1593.
