= Thomas Gardiner (Royalist) =

English lawyer and politician (1591–1652)

Sir Thomas Gardiner
- Born: 1591
- Died: 1652 (aged 60–61)
- Occupations: Lawyer, politician
- Years active: 1618–1652
- Political party: Royalist
- Children: Mary Gardiner

Sir Thomas Gardiner (1591–1652) was an English lawyer and politician who sat in the House of Commons in 1640. He supported the Royalist cause in the English Civil War.

Gardiner was called to the bar ar Inner Temple in 1618. He became Recorder of London in 1636 and a bencher of his Inn. In 1639, he became treasurer of his Inn. In April 1640, Gardiner was elected Member of Parliament for Callington in the Short Parliament. He was an unsuccessful Royalist candidate for the city of London.

When Charles I visited the city on 25 November 1641, Gardiner was knighted, and his speech specially commended by the king. In 1642, he was leading counsel to Sir Edward Herbert, when he was impeached. Gardiner was himself impeached soon after for his support of ship-money. He was solicitor-general to the king at Oxford in 1643. He was a Royalist commissioner at the Treaty of Uxbridge and Royalist attorney-general in 1645. He was pardoned by parliament in 1647 on payment of fine.

His daughter Mary was Maid of Honour to Queen Henrietta Maria in France, and one of the four Dressers to Queen Catherine after the Restoration, before marrying Sir Henry Wood, 1st Baronet. She died of smallpox on 17 March 1671, aged 38, and was buried in Westminster Abbey.

In 1679, her only child married an illegitimate son of King Charles II by Barbara Villiers, becoming Duchess of Southampton, but died of smallpox in 1680 at the age of seventeen.

Parliament of England
| Parliament suspended since 1629 | Member of Parliament for Callington; 1640; With: Samuel Rolle | Succeeded by Sir Arthur Ingram; George Fane |
