= John Bernard (MP for Hythe) =

English politician

John Bernard (fl. 1374–1390) from Hythe, Kent was an English politician.

== Family ==
Before 1366, Bernard married Joan Coul, who was the daughter and heiress of Richard Coul, also of Hythe. They had one daughter, whose name is unrecorded.

== Career ==
He was a Member (MP) of the Parliament of England for Hythe in 1378, May 1382, October 1383, April 1384 and 1386. He may have been involved in the cloth trade, but little is known of him.
