= John French (MP for Hythe) =

John French (fl. 1393), of Hythe, Kent, was an English Member of Parliament (MP).

He was a Member of the Parliament of England for Hythe in 1393. He had two sons, John French, MP for Winchelsea and Martin French, MP for Hythe.
