= Stewart Marjoribanks =

British Whig politician and wine merchant

Member of Parliament for Hythe
- In office 29 June 1841 – 31 July 1847
- Preceded by: William Elliot-Murray-Kynynmound
- Succeeded by: Edward Drake Brockman
- In office 8 March 1820 – 16 May 1837 Serving with John Loch (1830–1832); Robert Townsend Farquhar (1826–1830); Samuel Jones-Loyd (1820–1826)
- Preceded by: Samuel Jones-Loyd; John Perring
- Succeeded by: William Elliot-Murray-Kynynmound

Personal details
- Born: 1774
- Died: 31 August 1863 (aged 88–89)
- Party: Whig

Stewart Marjoribanks (1774 – 31 August 1863) was a British Whig politician, and wine merchant.

== Family ==
Marjoribanks was the third son of Edward Marjoribanks of Hallyards and Lees, Berwick, and Grizel née Stewart, daughter of Archibald Stewart of Edinburgh and Mitcham, Surrey; and the brother of Sir John Marjoribanks, 1st Baronet. He married twice, first to Eleanor, illegitimate daughter of Archibald Paxton, in 1798 and they had one son—Archibald John Marjoribanks—before her death in 1799. In 1841, he married Lucy, daughter of Edward Roger Pratt, and they had no children.

== Merchant ==
By 1798, after presumably working for him, Marjoribanks was in partnership with Paxton as a wine merchant, marrying Eleanor in the same year. On Paxton's death in 1817, Marjoribanks continued his business in conjunction with Paxton's son, William Gill Paxton; Marjoribanks' elder brother, Campbell, joined as a director of the company in 1807, becoming a chairman three times. At some point, it appears Marjoribanks became involved in the work of the East India Company, pursuing this line by 1817 and becoming a shipowner for the company on a "considerable scale" later on. By 1832, he had withdrawn from the wine business, and by 1840, he is considered to have sold his majority stake in his East India agency.

== New Zealand Company ==
In 1825 Marjoribanks was a director of the New Zealand Company, a venture chaired by the wealthy John George Lambton, Whig MP (and later 1st Earl of Durham), that made the first attempt to colonise New Zealand.

== Pacific Pearl Fishery Company ==
Also in 1825 Marjoribanks was one of the founders of the Pacific Pearl Fishery Company. The company sent out an expedition that consisted of Sir George Osborne and Rolla. The expedition's objective was partially commercial (exploring trade possibilities in the Society Islands), and partially scientific. The scientist Samuel Stutchbury was the expedition' scientist.

== Political career ==
By 1820, Marjoribanks was pursuing a political career. In that year's general election, he stood for Hythe and—with the help of a non-existent opposition, money, and patronage of the East India Company—he was "virtually impregnable". He declared independence from partisanship, however, stating to James Loch on the eve of the election that "I am not a Whig". Then, at the nomination, he was reported as declaring he:

did not hesitate to declare himself favourable to government, but he was not what is called ‘a thick and thin man’. Whenever administration proposed measures, which to his unbiased judgement appeared for the welfare of the country, they should have his support; but measures which he conceived to be of a contrary tendency, he would as firmly oppose; in short, he should look to measures and not to men.

Marjoribanks' election was successful but, as a Member of Parliament, he began voting with the Whig opposition on most major issues, joining Brooks's Club in 1823—but also voting with the Tories on issues including against the omission of arrears from the Duke of Clarence's grant in 1821. During this period he voted for Catholic emancipation, economy, retrenchment, and reduced taxation, as well as parliamentary reform—and was, in 1824, was described by James Abercromby as having "a very odd temper, which makes it difficult to deal with him".

He was returned unopposed at the 1826 general election, during which he again professed his independence. After this, he voted against the Duke of Clarence's grant and for Catholic emancipation. he voted for chancery reform, the disenfranchisement of Penryn, and the repeal of the Test Acts. On most major divisions on retrenchment, he voted with the Whig opposition.

By the 1830 general election, Marjoribanks was to all intents and purposes considered a Whig. He was returned for Hythe once more, alongside his cousin and chairman of the East India Company, John Loch, against opposition. After the election, he requested in an "anxious wish" from the Tory patronage secretary Joseph Planta for James Redsull to be made a Cinque Ports pilot. Planta noted:

Now though Mr. Marjoribanks is a Whig and has as yet voted against us, yet his Whiggery is very much modified (I think) of late, and if he chooses to come forward and ask this as a favour, it would perhaps (if it be a small favour) be a good thing to give it to him.

Marjoribanks' request was neither initially approved nor denied and a decision was made to consider this "at the proper time" as there was no appointment of pilots scheduled for that year. In the end, nothing came of the request.

In the press, Marjoribanks was now considered a "Wellington Whig" despite Tory ministers considering him a foe. In this period of his parliamentary career, he voted in favour of parliamentary reform, and for inquiries into grievances of West Indian sugar producers.

At the 1832 general election, Hythe was reduced to a single-member seat and Marjoribanks was again returned, opposed by a single Tory candidate. In the campaign, he expressed "cautious support" for the abolition of slavery, and described himself as "neither a republican, nor a radical". He held the seat until 1837, when he resigned by accepting the office of Steward of the Chiltern Hundreds, before standing unopposed for the seat again in 1841 and holding the seat until 1847 when he did not seek re-election.

== Death ==
Marjoribanks died in August 1863, leaving legacies in excess of £33,000. His estate, including property in Tasmania, Australia, was divided between his nephews Edward Marjoribanks and Dudley Marjoribanks, 1st Baron Tweedmouth.

Parliament of the United Kingdom
Preceded by Samuel Jones-Loyd; John Perring	Member of Parliament for Hythe; 1820–1837; With: John Loch (1830–1832); Robert Townsend Farquhar (1826–1830); Samuel Jones-Loyd (1820–1826)	Succeeded by William Elliot-Murray-Kynynmound
Preceded by William Elliot-Murray-Kynynmound	Member of Parliament for Hythe; 1841–1847	Succeeded by Edward Drake Brockman
