= Isaac Dorislaus =

Calvinist historian

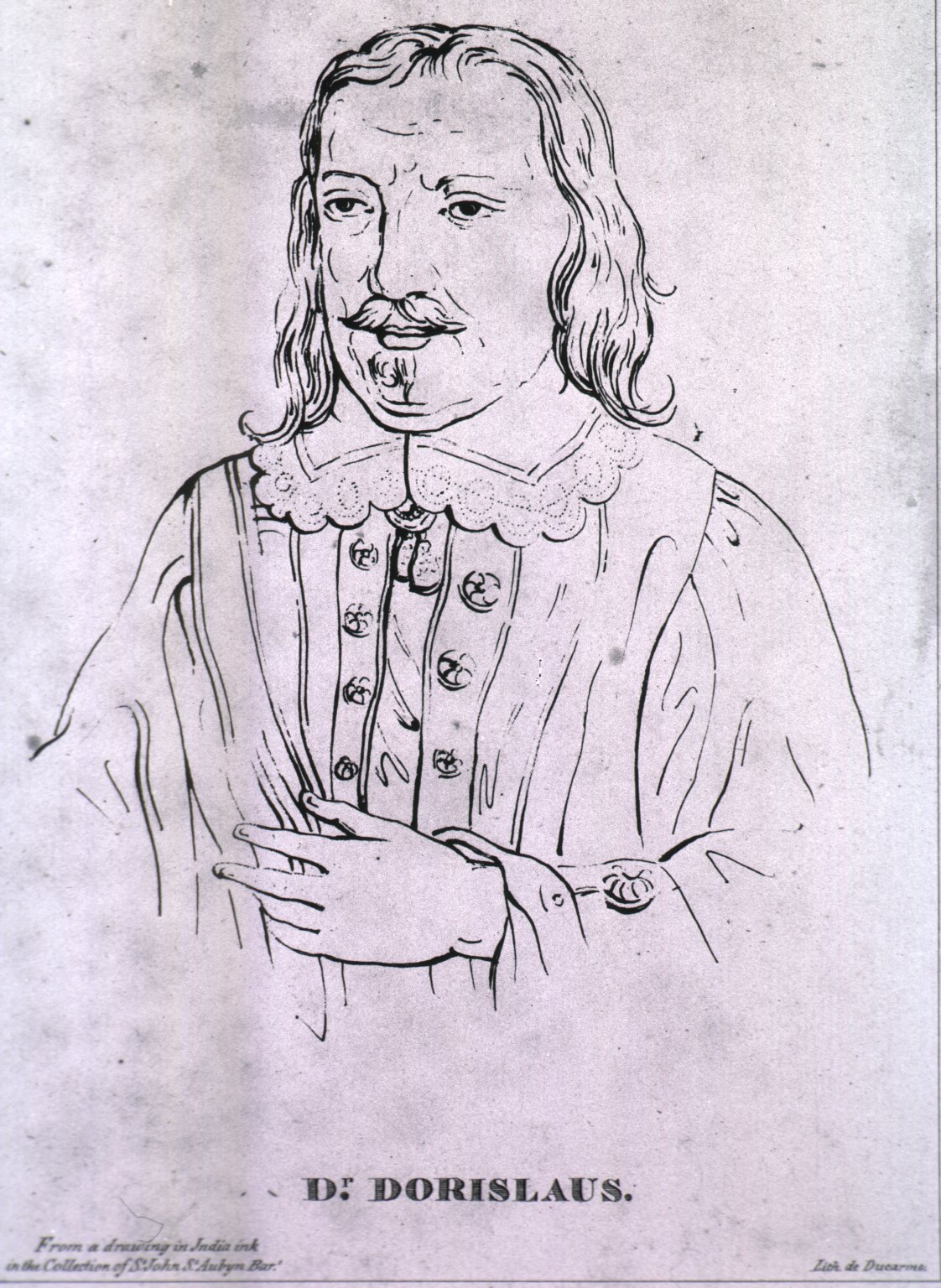
Isaac Dorislaus

Isaac Dorislaus (1595 – 2 May 1649) was a Dutch Calvinist historian and lawyer who was an important official in Oliver Cromwell's period of rule. He came to England as a historian. His lectures were seen as political rhetoric, with references to kings with unjustified power aimed at portraying the reigning monarch, Charles I of England, as a tyrant. Little was done about his propagandizing, however. Dorislaus became advocate general of the army in the first civil war, and for all his previous theorizing about ancient liberties, quickly showed authoritarian tendencies by his attempted introduction of martial law to help him root out Royalists. He is remembered for his part in the High Court of Justice for the trial of Charles I, although his role was not prominent, and he was assassinated by Royalists while on a diplomatic mission in his native country. Dorislaus, a Hollander in English service, was appointed by Parliament as ambassador in addition to Strickland. A few days after his arrival, he was murdered by Royalists seeking to avenge Charles I's death.

== Background and influence ==
From a strongly Calvinist family, he was educated at Leiden. He arrived in England as the University of Cambridge's first ever professor of History. From the outset he attacked the legitimacy of kings and justified revolt, as when he emphasized the Anglo-Saxon roots of England before 1066, emphasizing what he saw as democratic freedom enjoyed by all Englishmen before they lost it to the Norman conquerors and also justified the Dutch uprising against Spain. His apparent propagandizing for republicanism and regicide was seen as aimed at the King Charles I of England, who was suspected of Catholic sympathies and failure to uphold the country's interests against powerful foreign enemies. Despite his thinly veiled condemnation of the reigning royal power, little real action was taken against him apart from his doctorate being delayed. In 1629 he was admitted a commoner of the College of Advocates. In 1632 he made his peace at court, and on two occasions acted as judge advocate, in the Bishops War of 1640 and in 1642 in the army commanded by the Earl of Essex. Despite his early advocacy of freedom from untrammelled power, once ensconced in a position of authority, Dorislaus attempted to sweep away legal protection for the accused. He assisted in preparing the charge of high treason against Charles I but was not prominent in the proceedings themselves.

== Official of Commonwealth ==
In 1648 he became Judge of the High Court of Admiralty, and was sent on a diplomatic errand to the states-general of Holland, which was accused of having profited from England's civil war. Dorislaus did not live to see the First Anglo-Dutch War in which the Puritan regime of Cromwell fought its fellow Protestant power over commercial rivalries. While negotiating as a representative of the Commonwealth in the Dutch Republic, he was murdered at the Hague by a group of Royalists led by Walter Whitford, largely because of his role in the trial of Charles I. The assassination caused dismay among Cromwell's associates and great jubilation among royalists. His death also strained relations with the Dutch, whom the English Government accused of allowing Whitford to escape. In truth, Whitford had escaped to the Spanish Netherlands with the help of the Portuguese Ambassador, which would have made any attempt by the Dutch to catch him almost impossible. His remains were buried in Westminster Abbey, and moved in 1661 to St. Margaret's churchyard.

His death may have loosely inspired the short story Gentlemen of the Sealed Knot by Geoffrey Trease, about an unsuccessful Royalist attempt to assassinate the English ambassador to the Netherlands.

== See also ==
- List of regicides of Charles I
- List of unsolved murders
