= Richard Rykedon =

English Member of Parliament

Richard Rykedon or Rygdon (died 1453/4), was an English Member of Parliament (MP).

He was a Member of the Parliament of England for Hythe in December 1421, 1422, 1423, 1426, 1433, 1437 and November 1449.
