= Peter Heyman =

English politician

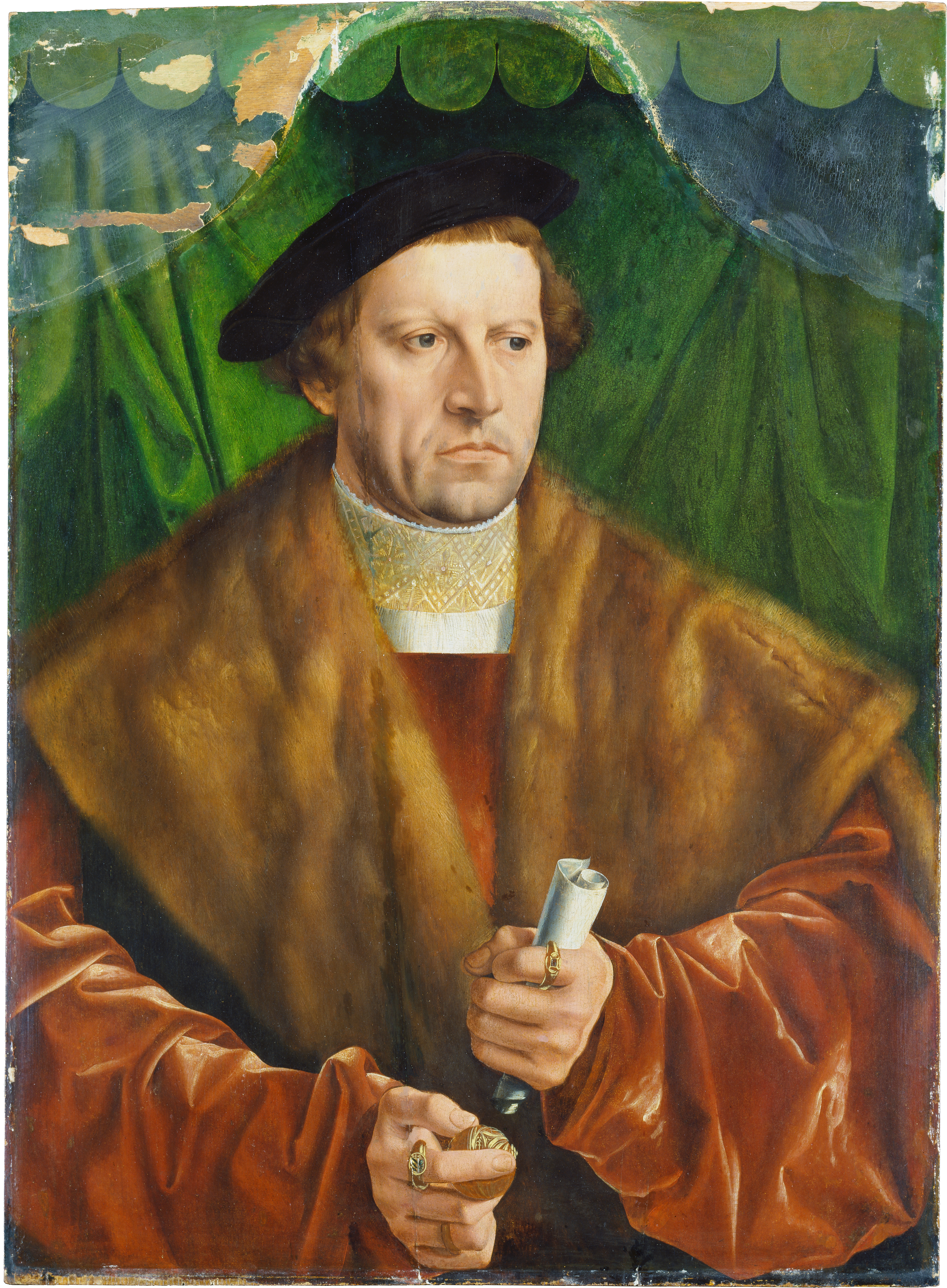
Portrait of Peter Heyman

Sir Peter Heyman (1580–1641) was an English politician who sat in the House of Commons variously between 1621 and 1641.

== Life ==
Heyman was born on 13 May 1580, the son of Henry Heyman of Sellinge, Kent and his wife Rebecca Horne, daughter the Right Rev. Robert Horne, Bishop of Winchester. He was admitted to Emmanuel College, Cambridge in 1597. He studied under William Bedell, who in 1624 buttonholed him in Parliament as overzealous to reform pluralism.

He was knighted by James I for services in Ireland, where he had a grant of land.

Heyman was elected Member of Parliament for Hythe in 1621, sitting with Richard Zouch whose commendation to the seat he had sought. In December of that year he was centrally involved in the "Sandys case" around privilege and Sir Edwin Sandys, and whether an interrogation he had undergone was related to his Parliament activities. In 1622 he was one of a large group of 60 individuals in Kent who were summoned by the Privy Council for their refusal to pay the second "benevolence" on behalf of the defence of the Palatinate; the perception of the "good cause" was outweighed for those with concerns by constitutional worries. Heyman was ordered to serve abroad at his own expense because of his opposition to the government, attending Arthur Chichester, 1st Baron Chichester on a mission to Heidelberg.

He was re-elected MP for Hythe in 1625 and sat in various parliaments until 1629, when King Charles decided to rule without parliament. He was imprisoned in 1629 by the Privy Council, after challenging the Speaker John Finch over his early adjournment of the session; this was the occasion on 25 February 1629 in which Finch was held down in his chair by Denzil Holles and others, and Heyman was identified by the Council as one of the leaders behind the incident. In April 1640, Heyman was elected Member of Parliament for Dover in the Short Parliament. He was re-elected MP for Dover for the Long Parliament in November 1640.

Heyman died in 1641.

== Family ==
Heyman married firstly Sarah Collett, daughter of Peter Collett, merchant of London. Their son Henry was also MP for Hythe and became a baronet. His second wife was Mary Wolley, daughter of Randolph Wolley, merchant of London.

== Notes ==
Parliament of England
Preceded by Sir Richard Smythe; Lionel Cranfield	Member of Parliament for Hythe; 1622–1624; With: Richard Zouche	Succeeded by Sir Edward Dering, 1st Baronet; Edward Clarke
Preceded by Sir Edward Dering, 1st Baronet; Edward Clarke	Member of Parliament for Hythe; 1625–1629; With: Edward Scott	Parliament suspended until 1640
Vacant Parliament suspended since 1629	Member of Parliament for Dover; 1640–1641; With: Sir Edward Boys	Succeeded by Sir Edward Boys; Benjamin Weston
