= Richard Daper =

English Member of Parliament

Richard Daper (by 1537-1571/1572), of London, was an English Member of Parliament (MP).

He was a Member of the Parliament of England for Hythe in 1558.
