= List of mayors of Hythe =

Mayors of Hythe, Kent, England:

- 1575: John Bridgman was the first mayor of Hythe.
- 1581-2: William Dalmyngton
- 1601: William Knight
- 1698-1699: Sir Philip Boteler, 3rd Baronet.
