= Richard Zouch =

English judge and Member of Parliament

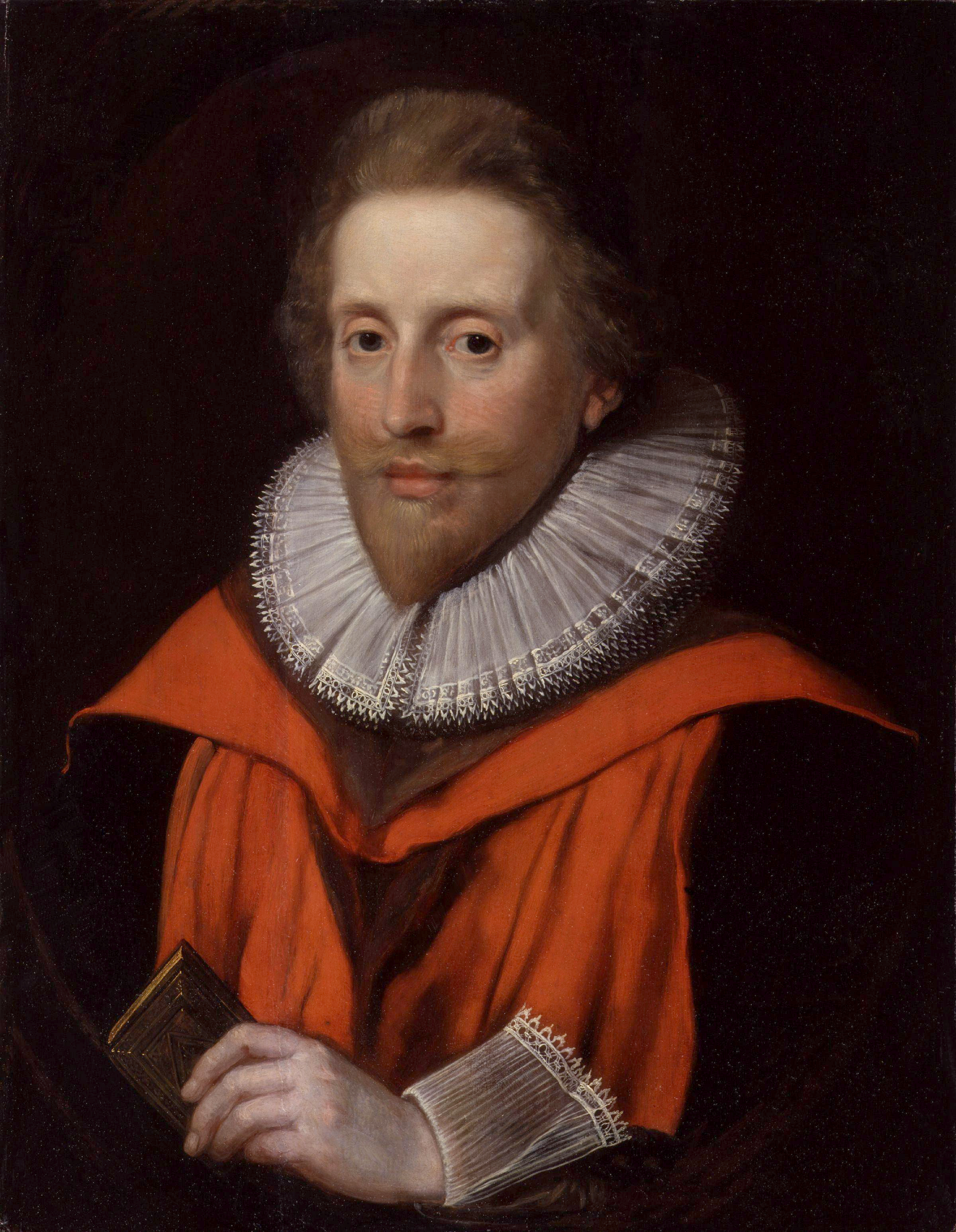
Zouch by Cornelius Johnson

Richard Zouch (c. 1590 – 1 March 1661) was an English judge and a Member of Parliament from 1621 to 1624. He was elected Member of Parliament for Hythe in 1621 and later became principal of St. Alban Hall, Oxford. During the English Civil War, he was a Royalist and was appointed by Oliver Cromwell to a special commission of oyer and terminer. Zouch wrote extensive legal texts and was among the earliest systematic writers of international law.

== Early life ==
Zouch was born at Ansty, Wiltshire, the third surviving son of Francis Zouche (d.1600) and Philippa, sixth daughter of George Ludlow of Hill Deverel, Wiltshire. He was educated at Winchester and afterwards at New College, Oxford, where he was a scholar in 1607, and Fellow in 1609. He graduated as B.C.L. in 1614, and D.C.L. in 1619, was admitted at Doctor's Commons, London, in January 1618, and was appointed Regius Professor of Civil Law at Oxford in 1620. In addition to his university duties, he had a large legal practice in London.

It was apparently in 1622 that he married Sarah, daughter of John Harte of Brill in Oxfordshire, a proctor in Doctors' Commons; having thus vacated his fellowship, he entered himself in 1623 as a fellow commoner at Wadham College.

== Career ==
In 1621 and 1624, through the influence of his cousin Edward la Zouche, 11th Baron Zouche, he was elected member of parliament for Hythe. In 1625 he became principal of St Alban Hall, Oxford.

He took a leading part in William Laud's codification of the statutes of the university (1629–1633). He acted for many years as assessor of the vice-chancellor's court, and in 1632 became chancellor of the diocese of Oxford. In 1641 he was made Judge of the High Court of Admiralty.

During the Civil War, he was a Royalist, though not a pronounced one. Under the Commonwealth, having submitted to the parliamentary visitors, he retained his university appointments, and was appointed by Oliver Cromwell to a special commission of oyer and terminer (consisting of three judges, three civilians, and three laymen, for the trial of Don Pantaleone Sa, the brother of the Portuguese ambassador, for murder committed in a brawl). Zouche was, however, not allowed to retain the judgeship of the admiralty, which was in 1649 conferred on John Exton. He was regarded with some suspicion by both factions.

After the Restoration, he was appointed to the commission which reinstated the professors and Fellows of Oxford who had been removed under the Protectorate of Cromwell. On 4 February 1661, he was restored to his judgeship, though he died soon afterwards at his apartments in Doctors' Commons, London, on 1 March 1661.

== Publications ==
=== Legal works ===
- Elementa jurisprudentiae (1629)
- Descriptio juris et judicii feudalis, secundum consuetudines Mediolani et Normanniae, pro introductione ad juris prudentiam Anglicanam (1634)
- Descriptio juris et judicii temporalis, secundum consuetudines feudales et Normannicas (1636)
- Descriptio juris et judicii ecclesiastici, secundum canones et consuetudines Anglicanas (1636)
- Descriptiones juris et judicii sacri, … militaris, … maritimi (1640)
- Juris et judicii fecialis sive juris inter gentes ... explicatio (1650)
- Solutio quaestionis de legati delinquentis judice competente (1657)

In virtue of the last two he has the distinction of being one of the earliest systematic writers on international law. According to Thomas Erskine Holland writing in the Dictionary of National Biography, Jeremy Bentham's coinage "international law" derives from the phrase jus inter gentes implied by Zouch's 1650 choice of title. Holland also identifies both Zouch and Arthur Duck as pupils of distinction of the civilian John Budden, in the Oxford tradition founded by Alberico Gentili.

=== Poetry ===
- The Dove, or Passages of Cosmography (1613)

== Notes ==
Parliament of England
Preceded by Sir Richard Smythe; Lionel Cranfield	Member of Parliament for Hythe; 1621–1624; With: Sir Peter Heyman	Succeeded by Sir Edward Dering, 1st Baronet; Edward Clarke
