= John Dyne (MP for Hythe) =

14th-century English politician

John Dyne (died 1412/13) was an English politician, landowner and merchant involved in shipping.

== Family ==
He married a woman named Margery and probably had two sons, including Thomas Dyne. His wife outlived him.

== Career ==
He attended Richard II's coronation. He was a member (MP) of the Parliament of England for Hythe in October 1377, 1381, February 1383, 1385, February 1388, January 1390, 1395 and January 1397.
