= John Bridgman =

English Member of Parliament (died 1581)

John Bridgman (died 1581), of Hythe, Kent, was an English Member of Parliament (MP).

He was a Member of the Parliament of England for Hythe in 1563 and 1572. In 1575, he was the first Mayor of Hythe.
