= Thomas Honywood (Hythe MP) =

English Member of Parliament

Thomas Honywood (died 1580), of Sene, Newington, Swale, Kent, was an English Member of Parliament (MP).

He was a Member of the Parliament of England for Hythe in 1572. His brother was Christopher Honywood.
