= Henry Philpot =

Henry Philpot (fl. 1406–1419) of Hythe, Kent, was an English Member of Parliament (MP).

He was a Member of the Parliament of England for Hythe in 1406, 1407, February 1413, 1417 and 1419.
