= William Hughelot =

William Hughelot (fl. 1388), of Hythe, Kent, was an English Member of Parliament (MP).

He was a Member of the Parliament of England for Hythe in February 1388.
