= William Oxenden =

English Member of Parliament

William Oxenden (c. 1510-1576), of Wingham, Kent, was an English Member of Parliament (MP). He was a Member of the Parliament of England for Hythe in October 1553 and for New Romney in 1554.
