= Henry Heyman =

English politician

Sir Henry Heyman, 1st Baronet (20 November 1610 – 1658) was an English politician who sat in the House of Commons from 1640 to 1653. He supported the Parliamentarian side in the English Civil War.

Heyman was born at Selling, Kent, the son of Sir Peter Heyman, MP for Hythe 1621-1622, and his wife Sarah Collett, daughter of Peter Collett merchant of London. He was admitted to Gray's Inn in 1626.

In April 1640, Heyman was elected Member of Parliament for Hythe in the Short Parliament. He was re-elected in November 1640 for the Long Parliament. Heyman was created Baronet of Somerfield in the County of Kent in the Baronetage of England on 12 August 1641.

Heyman died at the age of 47 at his seat, at Somerfield and was buried in the family vault, at Selling, in Kent.

Heyman married Mary Holford, daughter of Daniel Holford, of West Thurrock, Essex and had three sons and two daughters. His son Peter succeeded to the baronetcy.

Parliament of England
Vacant Parliament suspended since 1629	Member of Parliament for Hythe; 1640–1653; With: John Harvey; Thomas Westrow	Not represented in Barebones Parliament
Baronetage of England
New creation	Baronet (of Somerfield); 1641–1658	Succeeded by Peter Heyman
