= John Honywode =

John Honywode (fl. 1397), of Hythe, Kent, was an English Member of Parliament (MP).

He was a Member of the Parliament of England for Hythe in January 1397. He was the son of Alan Honywode.
