= William Carden (MP) =

English Member of Parliament

William Carden (by 1524-73 or later), of Hythe, Kent, was an English Member of Parliament (MP).

He was a Member of the Parliament of England for Hythe in April 1554.
