= Martin French (MP) =

Martin French (fl. 1407), of Hythe, Kent, was an English Member of Parliament (MP).

He was a Member of the Parliament of England for Hythe in 1407. He was the son of John French.
