= William Cundy =

William Cundy (died c. 1413), of Hythe, Kent, was an English Member of Parliament (MP).

He was a Member of the Parliament of England for Hythe in 1391. He was the brother of MP for Hythe, John Cundy.
