= William Dalmyngton =

English Member of Parliament

William Dalmyngton, Daulton or Daunton (by 1521-89 or later), of Hythe, Kent, was an English Member of Parliament (MP).

He was a Member of the Parliament of England for Hythe in March 1553 and 1586. He was Mayor of Hythe 1581–2.
