= William Shaw (MP for Hythe) =

English Member of Parliament

William Shaw (c. 1644–20 January 1697), of St. James's Street, Westminster, was an English Member of Parliament (MP).

He was a Member of the Parliament of England for Hythe in 1685.
