= John Knight (died 1566) =

English Member of Parliament

John Knight (c.1520-1566), of Hythe, Kent, was an English Member of Parliament (MP).

He was a Member of the Parliament of England for Hythe in March 1553, 1555 and 1558.
