= Christopher Honywood =

English Member of Parliament

Christopher Honywood (died 1599) of Hythe, Kent, was an English Member of Parliament (MP).

He was a Member of the Parliament of England for Hythe in 1584 and 1597.
