= Stephen Harry (MP for Hythe) =

English Member of Parliament

Stephen Harry (by 1495-1534 or later), of Hythe, Kent, was an English Member of Parliament (MP).

He was a Member of the Parliament of England for Hythe in 1529 and possibly in 1536. The MPs for Hythe in 1539 were unrecorded.

Parliament of England
Preceded by unrecorded unrecorded	Member of Parliament for Hythe; 1529; With: John Hull	Succeeded by unrecorded (possibly still John Hull) unrecorded (possibly still Stephen Harry)
