= George Morton (cricketer) =

English cricketer

Personal information
- Full name: George Morton
- Born: 25 April 1828; Bedale, Yorkshire, England
- Died: 21 June 1861 (aged 33); Bedale, Yorkshire, England
- Batting: Unknown
- Role: Wicket-keeper

Career statistics
Competition	First-class
Matches	3
Runs scored	19
Batting average	3.16
100s/50s	–/–
Top score	13*
Catches/stumpings	8/4
- Source: Cricinfo, 1 September 2019

George Morton (25 April 1828 – 21 June 1861) was an English first-class cricketer.

Morton was born at Bedale in April 1828. Having played club cricket for a number of sides in the North of England, Morton made his debut in first-class cricket for the North in the North v South fixture of 1853 at The Oval, with him also appearing for the All England Eleven (AEE) in the same season against a combined Kent and Sussex cricket team at Tunbridge Wells. The following year he played for the North in the North v South fixture of 1854, before appearing in the same fixture in 1856. Morton scored 19 runs in his four first-class matches, while in hs role as a wicket-keeper he took 8 catches and made 4 stumpings. He died at Bedale in June 1861.
