= George Morton (born c.1540) =

English Member of Parliament

George Morton (born c. 1540), of East Stour, Chilham, Kent, was an English Member of Parliament (MP). He was a Member of the Parliament of England for Hythe in 1572 and 1584.
