= Thomas Keys (MP) =

English Member of Parliament

Thomas Keys (by 1524–1571), of St. Radigund's, near Dover, Kent, was an English Member of Parliament (MP). He was a Member of the Parliament of England for Hythe in November 1554.
