= Edward Drake Brockman =

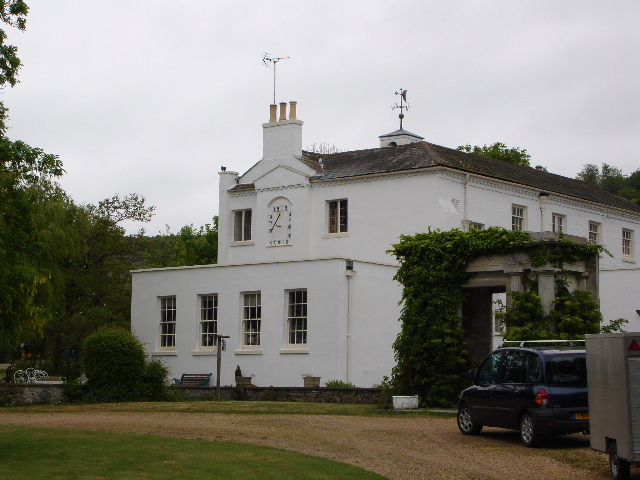
- Beachborough House, Kent - the Drake-Brockman family seat

Member of Parliament for Hythe
- In office 31 July 1847 – 28 March 1857
- Preceded by: Stewart Marjoribanks
- Succeeded by: John William Ramsden

Personal details
- Born: 20 December 1793
- Died: 5 November 1858 (aged 64)
- Party: Whig
- Parent: James Drake-Brockman

Edward Drake Brockman (20 December 1793 – 5 November 1858) was a British barrister and Whig politician.

Brockman was a younger son of James Drake Brockman of Beachborough, near Hythe, Kent, High Sheriff of Kent for 1791. He studied law at the Inner Temple and was called to the bar in 1819, becoming Recorder of Folkestone.

He was elected Whig MP for Hythe at the 1847 general election and held the seat until 1857, when he did not stand in that year's general election.

Parliament of the United Kingdom
Preceded by Stewart Marjoribanks	Member of Parliament for Hythe; 1847–1857	Succeeded by John William Ramsden
