= John Boteler (died 1746) =

English Member of Parliament

John Boteler (born after 1668 – died 1746), of Teston, near Maidstone, Kent, was an English Member of Parliament. He was a Member (MP) of the Parliament of England for Hythe, January 1701 to 1710 and Parliament of Great Britain from 27 January 1711 to 1715.
