= John Estday =

English Member of Parliament

John Estday, Esday or Eastday (by 1533–1571), of Hythe, Kent, was an English Member of Parliament (MP).

He was a Member of the Parliament of England for Hythe in April and November 1554.
