= John Berde (MP for Hythe) =

English Member of Parliament

John Berde (by 1471-1521/22), of Hythe, Kent, was an English Member of Parliament (MP).

He was a Member of the Parliament of England for Hythe in 1510 and 1512.
