= Alan Honywode =

Alan Honywode (fl. 1393), of Hythe, Kent, was an English Member of Parliament (MP).

He was a Member of the Parliament of England for Hythe in 1393. His son was the MP, John Honywode.
