= John Cundy =

John Cundy (fl. 1388) of Hythe, Kent, was an English Member of Parliament (MP).

He was a Member of the Parliament of England for Hythe in September 1388. He was the brother of MP, William Cundy, also an MP for Hythe.
