= John Storme =

John Storme (fl. 1395) of Hythe, Kent, was an English Member of Parliament (MP).

He was a Member of the Parliament of England for Hythe in 1395.
