= Henry Philpott (cricketer) =

English cricketer (1829–1880)

Henry Philpott (20 December 1829 — 29 March 1880) was an English cricketer who played for Sussex. He was born and died in Brighton.

Philpott made a single first-class appearance, during the 1855 season, against Surrey. From the lower order, Philpott scored 1 not out in the first innings in which he batted, and 10 runs in the second.
