= Lady Mary Dering =

English composer (1629–1704)

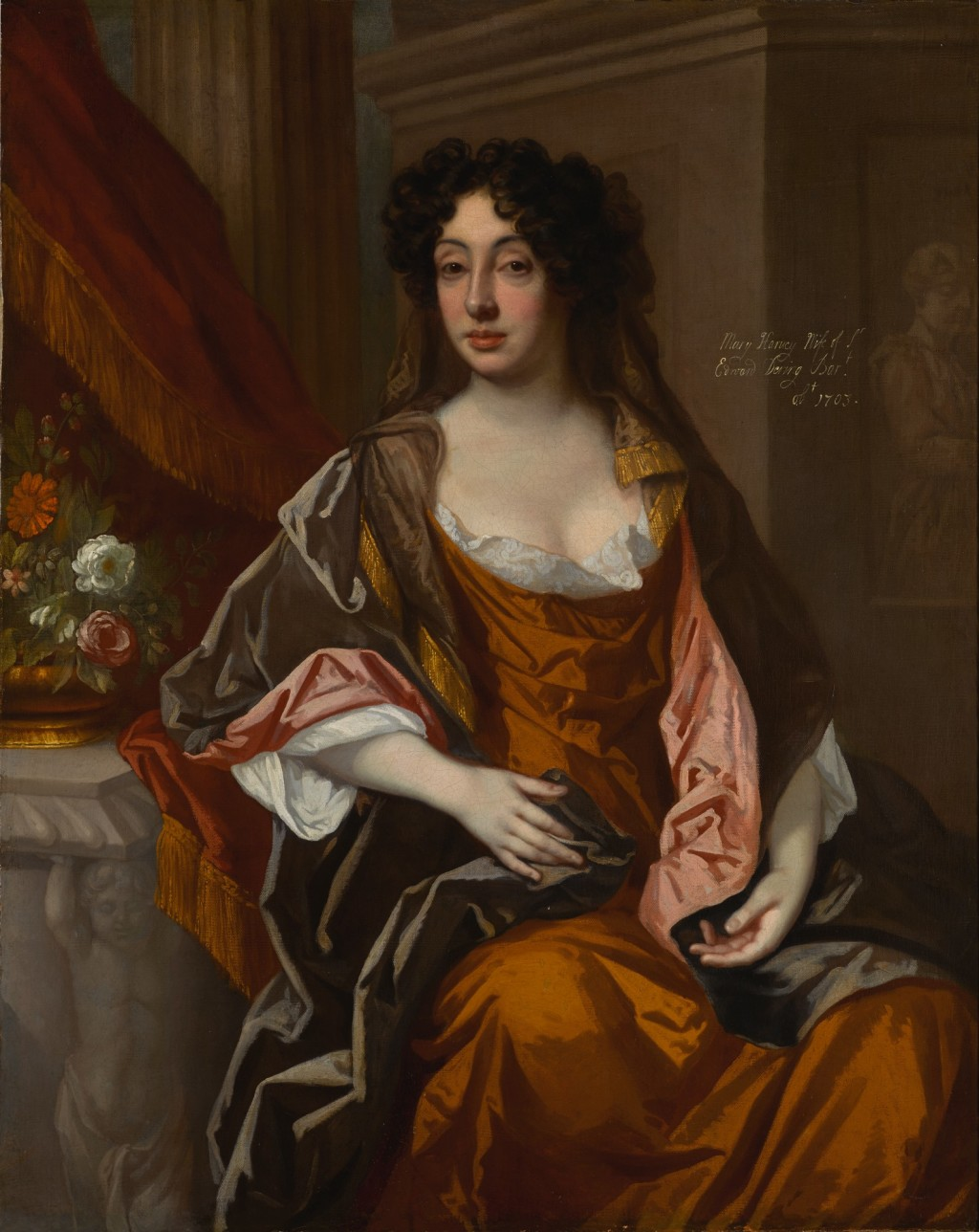
- Born: Croydon
- Died: 7 February 1704; Pluckley
- Occupation: Composer
- Spouse(s): Sir Edward Dering, 2nd Baronet
- Children: 17
- Parent(s): Daniel Harvey; Elizabeth Kinnersley

Lady Mary Dering (née Mary Harvey; baptised 3 September 1629 – 7 February 1704) was an English composer of the Baroque period. Three of her songs were included in the Select Ayres and Dialogues (1655), a collection published by Dering's teacher Henry Lawes.

== Life ==
The daughter of Daniel Harvey and Elizabeth Kynnersley, Mary Harvey was baptised in Croydon on 3 September 1629, and therefore probably born within a day or two of that. Daniel Harvey was a wealthy London merchant and member of the Levant Company, his eldest brother being the anatomist William Harvey.

Mary Harvey was sent to Mrs. Salmon's school in Hackney, London, where her friends included Mary Aubrey (later her sister-in-law, and niece of John Aubrey) and poet Katherine Philips (the Matchless Orinda). In 1645, she married her cousin and father's former apprentice, William Hauke; this was without her father's consent, and it was quickly annulled. The man her father arranged for her to marry, and whom she did on 5 April 1648, was Sir Edward Dering. The marriage turned out well; the couple produced seventeen children (seven of whom died young), as well as poems and music. Despite bearing so many children, Dering outlived her husband by twenty years, dying in February 1704 (1705 New Style); she also outlived her eldest son Sir Edward Dering, 3rd Baronet.

Dering studied music with the composer Henry Lawes. Lawes dedicated his Second book of airs to her, declaring that:

I have consider’d, but could not find it lay in my power to offer this Book to any but to your Ladiship. Not only in regard of that honour and esteem you have for Musick, but because those Songs which fill this Book have receiv’d much lustre by your excellent performance of them; and (which I confesse I rejoice to speak of) some which I esteem the best of these Ayres, were of your own Composition, after your Noble Husband was pleased to give the Words. For (although your Ladiship resolv’d to keep it private) I beg leave to declare, for my own honour, that you are not only excellent for the time you spent in the practise of what I set, but are your self so good a Composer, that few of any sex have arriv’d to such perfection.

The only works of hers which survive are the three songs that Lawes published in this volume - incidentally, the first published music by a female composer in England. The songs are titled "When First I Saw Fair Doris' Eyes", "And is this All? What One Poor Kiss?", and "A False Designe to be Cruel" ("In vain fair Chloris"). Her music fits stylistically within the mid-seventeenth century Baroque tradition, and is noticeably influenced by the work of Lawes.

Dering was buried at Pluckley in Kent, and has a memorial inscription in the church there.
