= Jacob des Bouverie =

English Member of Parliament

Jacob des Bouverie (1659 – 1722), of Allhallows, Barking, London and Terlingham, near Folkestone, Kent, was an English Member of Parliament. He was a Member (MP) of the Parliament of England for Hythe, 1695 to 1700 and Parliament of Great Britain from 1713 to 1722. The Bouverie family were Huguenots who had come over from Flanders.
