= Hythe (constituency) =

Former parliamentary constituency in the United Kingdom

- Former constituency for the House of Commons

1366–1950
- Seats: 1366–1832: two 1832–1950: one
- Replaced by: Folkestone and Hythe

Hythe was a constituency centred on the town of Hythe in Kent. It returned two Members of Parliament to the House of Commons until 1832, when its representation was reduced to one member. The constituency was abolished for the 1950 general election, and replaced with the new Folkestone and Hythe constituency.

== Boundaries ==
1918–1950: The Municipal Boroughs of Folkestone and Hythe, the Urban District of Cheriton, and part of the Urban District of Sandgate.

== Members of Parliament ==
=== 1366–1640 ===
Parliament	First member	Second member
1386	Henry Browning	John Bernard
1388 (Feb)	John Dyne	William Hughelot
1388 (Sep)	Walter Fisher	John Cundy
1390 (Jan)	John Dyne	Henry Browning
1390 (Nov)		
1391	Henry Browning	William Cundy
1393	John French	Alan Honywode
1394		
1395	John Dyne	John Storme
1397 (Jan)	John Dyne	John Honywode
1397 (Sept)
1399	Thomas Canterbury	Alexander Appleford
1401		
1402	Thomas Casebourne	Alexander Appleford
1404 (Jan)		
1404 (Oct)		
1406	Thomas Casebourne	Henry Philpot
1407	Martin French	Henry Philpot
1410	Alexander Appleford	Stephen Rye
1411	William Canoun	
1413 (Feb)	Henry Philpot	Stephen Rye
1413 (May)	Thomas Casebourne	Stephen Rye
1414 (Apr)	William Canoun	Stephen Rye
1414 (Nov)	Robert Bannok	William Yoklete
1415		
1416 (Mar)		
1416 (Oct)		
1417	Henry Philpot	Stephen Rye
1419	Henry Philpot	John Skinner
1420	Alexander Appleford	John Overhaven
1421 (May)	Thomas Bromlegh	John Leigh
1421 (Dec)	John Overhaven	Richard Rykedon
1510	John Honywood	John Berde
1512	Clement Holwey	John Berde
1515	not known	
1523	not known	
1529	John Hull	Stephen Harry
1536	?John Hull	?Stephen Harry
1539	not known	
1542	not known	
1545	not known	
1547	William Brooke alias Cobham	William Baddell
1553 (Mar)	William Dalmyngton	John Knight
1553 (Oct)	Thomas Jekyn	William Oxenden
1554 (Apr)	William Carden	John Estday
1554 (Nov)	John Estday	Thomas Keys
1555	John Knight	John Fowler
1558	John Knight	Richard Daper
1559	William Baddell	Ralph Haselhurst
1562–3	Edward Popham	John Bridgman
1571	William Cromer	John Stephenson
1572	Thomas Honywood, died and replaced Nov 1584 by George Morton	John Bridgman
1584	Christopher Honywood	Thomas Bodley, sat for Portsmouth replaced by ?George Morton
1586	John Smythe	William Dalmyngton
1588–9	John Collins	John Smythe
1593	Henry Fane	John Collins
1597	Christopher Honywood	Christopher Toldervey
1601	William Knight	Christopher Toldervey
1604	Sir John Smith died and replaced 1609 by Sir Norton Knatchbull	Christopher Toldervey
1614	Sir Richard Smythe	Lionel Cranfield
1621-1622	Sir Peter Heyman	Richard Zouche
1624	Sir Peter Heyman	Richard Zouche
1625	Sir Edward Dering, 1st Baronet	Edward Clarke
1626	Sir Peter Heyman	Basil Dixwell
1628-1629	Sir Peter Heyman	Sir Edward Scott
1629–1640	No Parliaments summoned	

=== 1640–1832 ===
Year	First member	First party	Second member	Second party
April 1640	John Wandesford	Royalist	(Sir) Henry Heyman	Parliamentarian
November 1640	John Harvey	Parliamentarian	(Sir) Henry Heyman	Parliamentarian
1645	Thomas Westrow		(Sir) Henry Heyman	Parliamentarian
1653	Hythe was unrepresented in the Barebones Parliament and the First and Second Parliaments of the Protectorate			
January 1659	Sir Robert Hales		William Kenrick	
May 1659	Not represented in the restored Rump			
1660	The Viscount Strangford		Phineas Andrews	
May 1661	John Hervey		Phineas Andrews	
November 1661	John Hervey		Sir Henry Wood	
1673	John Hervey		Sir Leoline Jenkins	
February 1679	Sir Edward Dering		Julius Deedes	
August 1679	Sir Edward Dering		Edward Hales	
April 1685	Heneage Finch		Julius Deedes	
June 1685	Heneage Finch		William Shaw	
1689	Edward Hales		Julius Deedes	
1690	Sir Philip Boteler		William Brockman	
1695	Sir Philip Boteler		Jacob des Bouverie	
1701	Sir Philip Boteler		John Boteler	
1708	John Fane		John Boteler	
1710 (Note: At the election of 1710, Fane and Shannon were returned as elected but, on petition, they were declared not to have been duly elected and Berners and Boteler were seated in their place.)	John Fane		The Viscount Shannon	
1711	John Boteler		William Berners	
1712	John Boteler		The Viscount Shannon	
1713	Jacob des Bouverie		John Boteler	
1715	Jacob des Bouverie		Sir Samuel Lennard	
1722	Captain Hercules Baker		Sir Samuel Lennard	
1728	Captain Hercules Baker		William Glanville	
1744	(Sir) Thomas Hales (Note: Succeeded as baronet, January 1748.)		William Glanville	
1761	Lord George Sackville		William Glanville	
1766	Lord George Sackville		William Amherst	
1768	John Sawbridge		William Evelyn	
1774	Sir Charles Farnaby (Note: Farnaby adopted the surname Radcliffe in 1783.)		William Evelyn	
1798	Hon. Charles Marsham (Note: Styled Viscount Marsham from June 1801 (when his father was created Earl of Romney).)		William Evelyn	
1802	Matthew White		Thomas Godfrey	
1806	Viscount Marsham		Thomas Godfrey	
1807	William Deedes		Thomas Godfrey	
1810	William Deedes		Sir John Perring	
1812	Matthew White		Sir John Perring	
1818	John Bladen Taylor		Sir John Perring	
1819	Samuel Jones-Loyd	Whig	Sir John Perring	
1820	Samuel Jones-Loyd	Whig	Stewart Marjoribanks	Whig
1826	Sir Robert Townsend-Farquhar	Tory	Stewart Marjoribanks	Whig
1830	John Loch	Whig	Stewart Marjoribanks	Whig
1832	Representation reduced to one member			

=== 1832–1950 ===
Year	Member	Party
1832	Stewart Marjoribanks	Whig
1837	Viscount Melgund	Whig
1841	Stewart Marjoribanks	Whig
1847	Edward Drake Brockman	Whig
1857	Sir John Ramsden	Whig
1859	Baron Mayer de Rothschild	Liberal
1874	Sir Edward Watkin	Liberal
1885	Sir Edward Watkin	Independent Liberal
1886	Sir Edward Watkin	Liberal Unionist
1888	Sir Edward Watkin	Independent Liberal
1895	Sir James Bevan Edwards	Conservative
1899	Sir Edward Sassoon	Liberal Unionist
1912	Sir Philip Sassoon	Unionist
1939	Rupert Brabner	Conservative
1945	Harry Mackeson	Conservative
1950	constituency abolished	

== Election results ==
=== Elections in the 1830s ===
Townsend-Farquhar's death caused a by-election.

By-election, 26 March 1830: Hythe
Party	Candidate	Votes	%
Whig	John Loch	Unopposed	
Whig gain from Tory			

General election 1830: Hythe
Party	Candidate	Votes	%
Whig	Stewart Marjoribanks	270	48.6
Whig	John Loch	270	48.6
Tory	William Fraser	8	1.4
Tory	Fitzroy Kelly	8	1.4
Majority		262	47.2
Turnout		278	c. 64.7
Registered electors		c. 430	
Whig hold			
Whig gain from Tory			

- 204 Scot and Lot votes were placed for Fraser and Kelly, but these were rejected

General election 1831: Hythe
Party	Candidate	Votes	%
Whig	Stewart Marjoribanks	Unopposed	
Whig	John Loch	Unopposed	
Whig hold			
Whig hold			

General election 1832: Hythe
Party	Candidate	Votes	%
Whig	Stewart Marjoribanks	226	53.3
Tory	William Fraser	198	46.7
Majority		28	6.6
Turnout		424	90.4
Registered electors		469	
Whig hold			

General election 1835: Hythe
Party	Candidate	Votes	%
Whig	Stewart Marjoribanks	Unopposed	
Registered electors		477	
Whig hold			

Marjoribanks resigned, causing a by-election.

By-election, 16 May 1837: Hythe
Party	Candidate	Votes	%
Whig	William Elliot-Murray-Kynynmound	Unopposed	
Whig hold			

General election 1837: Hythe
Party	Candidate	Votes	%
Whig	William Elliot-Murray-Kynynmound	243	64.1
Conservative	William Horsley Beresford	136	35.9
Majority		107	28.2
Turnout		379	79.6
Registered electors		476	
Whig hold			

=== Elections in the 1840s ===
General election 1841: Hythe
Party	Candidate	Votes	%	±%
Whig	Stewart Marjoribanks	Unopposed		
Registered electors		513		
Whig hold				

General election 1847: Hythe
Party	Candidate	Votes	%	±%
Whig	Edward Drake Brockman	211	52.8	N/A
Whig	Mayer Amschel de Rothschild	189	47.3	N/A
Majority		22	5.5	N/A
Turnout		400	82.5	N/A
Registered electors		485		
Whig hold		Swing	N/A	

=== Elections in the 1850s ===
General election 1852: Hythe
Party	Candidate	Votes	%	±%
Whig	Edward Drake Brockman	512	83.9	+31.1
Whig	Robert Standish Motte	98	16.1	−31.2
Majority		414	67.8	+62.3
Turnout		610	71.3	−11.2
Registered electors		856		
Whig hold		Swing	+31.2	

General election 1857: Hythe
Party	Candidate	Votes	%	±%
Whig	John William Ramsden	490	65.5	−18.4
Peelite	Henry Aitcheson Hankey	258	34.5	N/A
Majority		232	31.0	−36.8
Turnout		748	74.9	+3.6
Registered electors		998		
Whig hold		Swing	N/A	

Ramsden resigned, causing a by-election.

By-election, 15 February 1859: Hythe
Party	Candidate	Votes	%	±%
Whig	Mayer Amschel de Rothschild	Unopposed		
Whig hold				

General election 1859: Hythe
Party	Candidate	Votes	%	±%
Liberal	Mayer Amschel de Rothschild	Unopposed		
Registered electors		997		
Liberal hold				

=== Elections in the 1860s ===
General election 1865: Hythe
Party	Candidate	Votes	%	±%
Liberal	Mayer Amschel de Rothschild	Unopposed		
Registered electors		1,291		
Liberal hold				

General election 1868: Hythe
Party	Candidate	Votes	%	±%
Liberal	Mayer Amschel de Rothschild	1,268	70.9	N/A
Conservative	Albert Nugent	521	29.1	New
Majority		747	41.8	N/A
Turnout		1,789	78.6	N/A
Registered electors		2,275		
Liberal hold		Swing	N/A	

=== Elections in the 1870s ===
General election 1874: Hythe
Party	Candidate	Votes	%	±%
Liberal	Edward Watkin	1,347	81.8	N/A
Liberal	Montague Merryweather	300	18.2	N/A
Majority		1,047	63.6	+21.8
Turnout		1,647	67.4	−11.2
Registered electors		2,445		
Liberal hold		Swing	N/A	

=== Elections in the 1880s ===
General election 1880: Hythe
Party	Candidate	Votes	%	±%
Liberal	Edward Watkin	Unopposed		
Registered electors		2,893		
Liberal hold				

General election 1885: Hythe
Party	Candidate	Votes	%	±%
Independent Liberal	Edward Watkin	2,247	73.8	N/A
Liberal	Alpheus Morton	797	26.2	N/A
Majority		1,450	47.6	N/A
Turnout		3,044	81.5	N/A
Registered electors		3,737		
Independent Liberal gain from Liberal		Swing	N/A	

General election 1886: Hythe
Party	Candidate	Votes	%	±%
Liberal Unionist	Edward Watkin	Unopposed		
Liberal Unionist gain from Independent Liberal				

=== Elections in the 1890s ===
General election 1892: Hythe
Party	Candidate	Votes	%	±%
Independent Liberal	Edward Watkin	Unopposed		
Independent Liberal gain from Liberal Unionist				

Edwards

General election 1895: Hythe
Party	Candidate	Votes	%	±%
Conservative	James Bevan Edwards	2,189	55.9	New
Liberal	Israel Hart	1,726	44.1	New
Majority		463	11.8	N/A
Turnout		3,915	83.4	N/A
Registered electors		4,695		
Conservative gain from Independent Liberal		Swing	N/A	

Edwards' resignation caused a by-election.

1899 Hythe by-election
Party	Candidate	Votes	%	±%
Conservative	Edward Sassoon	2,425	56.1	+0.2
Liberal	Israel Hart	1,898	43.9	−0.2
Majority		527	12.2	+0.4
Turnout		4,323	82.8	−0.6
Registered electors		5,224		
Conservative hold		Swing	+0.2	

=== Elections in the 1900s ===
General election 1900: Hythe
Party	Candidate	Votes	%	±%
Conservative	Edward Sassoon	Unopposed		
Conservative hold				

Biron

General election 1906: Hythe
Party	Candidate	Votes	%	±%
Conservative	Edward Sassoon	3,246	58.0	N/A
Liberal	Chartres Biron	2,347	42.0	New
Majority		899	16.0	N/A
Turnout		5,593	85.8	N/A
Registered electors		6,520		
Conservative hold		Swing	N/A	

=== Elections in the 1910s ===
General election January 1910: Hythe
Party	Candidate	Votes	%	±%
Conservative	Edward Sassoon	3,746	65.7	+7.7
Liberal	William Clarke Hall	1,954	34.3	−7.7
Majority		1,792	31.4	+15.4
Turnout		5,700	87.1	+1.3
Conservative hold		Swing	+7.7	

General election December 1910: Hythe
Party	Candidate	Votes	%	±%
Conservative	Edward Sassoon	Unopposed		
Conservative hold				

1912 Hythe by-election
Party	Candidate	Votes	%	±%
Unionist	Philip Sassoon	3,722	65.0	N/A
Liberal	Samuel Moorhouse	2,004	35.0	New
Majority		1,718	30.0	N/A
Turnout		5,726	82.2	N/A
Unionist hold		Swing	N/A	

General Election 1914–15:

Another General Election was required to take place before the end of 1915. The political parties had been making preparations for an election to take place and by July 1914, the following candidates had been selected;

- Unionist: Philip Sassoon
- Liberal: William Deedes

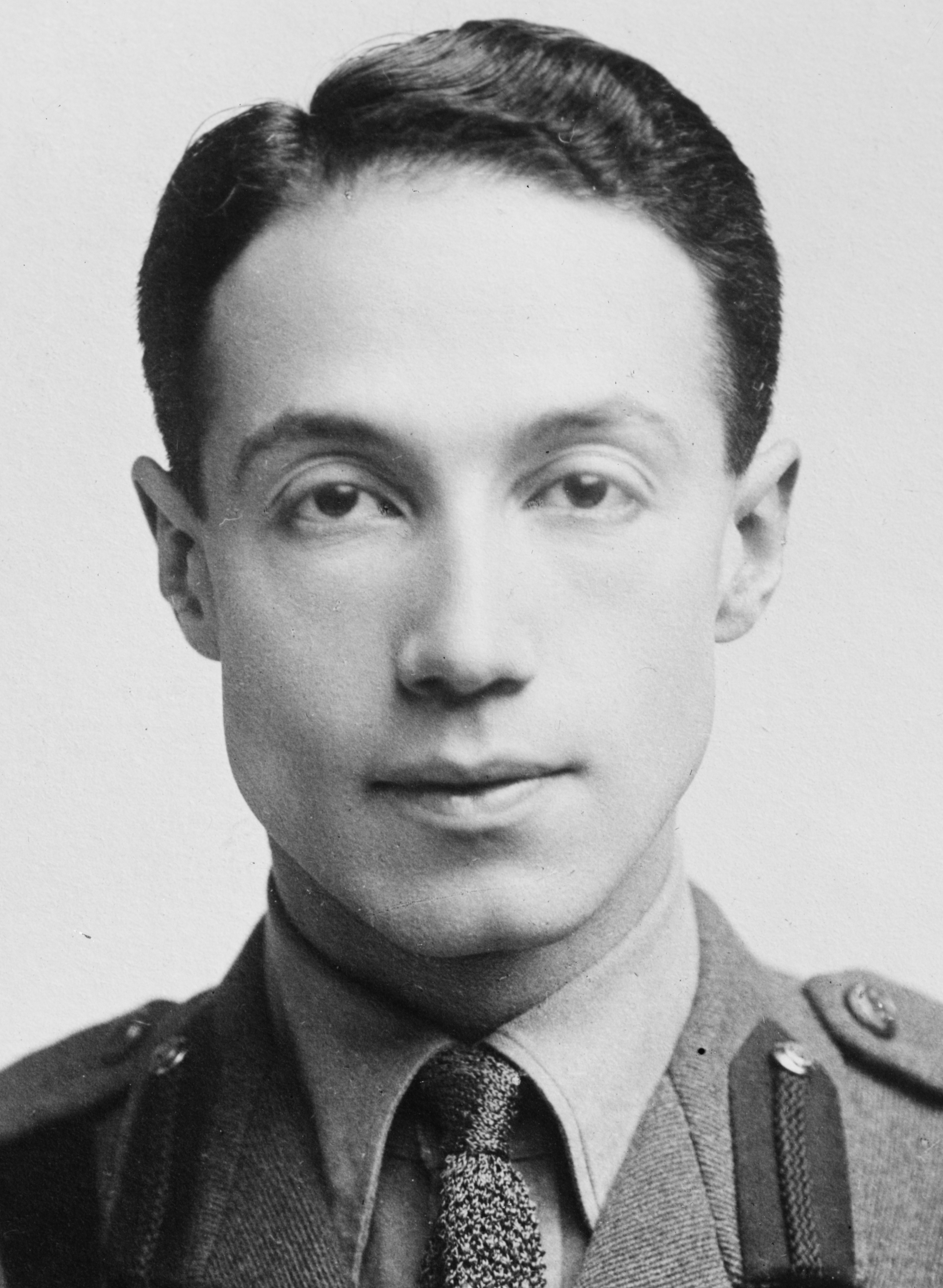
Sassoon

General election 1918: Hythe
Party		Candidate	Votes	%	±%
C	Unionist	Philip Sassoon	8,819	72.0	N/A
	Labour	Robert William Forsyth	3,427	28.0	New
Majority			5,392	44.0	N/A
Turnout			12,236	61.6	N/A
Registered electors			19,896		
	Unionist hold		Swing	N/A	
C indicates candidate endorsed by the coalition government.

=== Elections in the 1920s ===
General election 1922: Hythe
Party	Candidate	Votes	%	±%
Unionist	Philip Sassoon	Unopposed		
Unionist hold				

General election 1923: Hythe
Party	Candidate	Votes	%	±%
Unionist	Philip Sassoon	Unopposed		
Unionist hold				

General election 1924: Hythe
Party	Candidate	Votes	%	±%
Unionist	Philip Sassoon	12,843	76.5	N/A
Labour	Constantine Gallop	3,936	23.5	New
Majority		8,907	53.0	N/A
Turnout		16,779	79.7	N/A
Registered electors		21,058		
Unionist hold		Swing	N/A	

General election 1929: Hythe
Party	Candidate	Votes	%	±%
Unionist	Philip Sassoon	12,982	57.8	−18.7
Liberal	Hester Lloyd Holland	6,912	30.7	New
Labour	Grace Colman	2,597	11.5	−12.0
Majority		6,070	27.1	−25.9
Turnout		22,491	70.8	−8.9
Registered electors		31,745		
Unionist hold		Swing	−3.4	

=== Elections in the 1930s ===
General election 1931: Hythe
Party	Candidate	Votes	%	±%
Conservative	Philip Sassoon	20,277	84.9	+27.1
Labour	Grace Colman	3,608	15.1	+3.6
Majority		16,669	69.8	+42.7
Turnout		23,885	71.8	+1.0
Conservative hold		Swing		

- The Liberal candidate, Hester Holland withdrew on 14 Oct 1931

General election 1935: Hythe
Party	Candidate	Votes	%	±%
Conservative	Philip Sassoon	15,359	63.9	−21.0
Liberal	Richard Hathaway Ellis	8,688	36.1	New
Majority		6,671	27.8	−42.0
Turnout		24,047	68.3	−3.5
Conservative hold		Swing		

1939 Hythe by-election
Party	Candidate	Votes	%	±%
Conservative	Rupert Brabner	12,016	54.2	−9.7
Liberal	Frank Ongley Darvall	9,577	43.2	+7.1
Independent	St John Philby	576	2.6	New
Majority		2,439	11.0	−16.8
Turnout		22,169	62.4	−5.9
Conservative hold		Swing	-8.4	

- Philby was a candidate for the British People's Party.

=== Elections in the 1940s ===
General election 1945: Hythe
Party	Candidate	Votes	%	±%
Conservative	Harry Mackeson	8,048	46.5	−17.4
Labour	David Widdicombe	6,091	35.2	New
Liberal	Arthur Dyke Beauchamp James	3,152	18.2	−17.9
Majority		1,957	11.3	−16.5
Turnout		17,291	73.3	+5.0
Conservative hold		Swing		
