= John Exton (lawyer) =

English admiralty lawyer

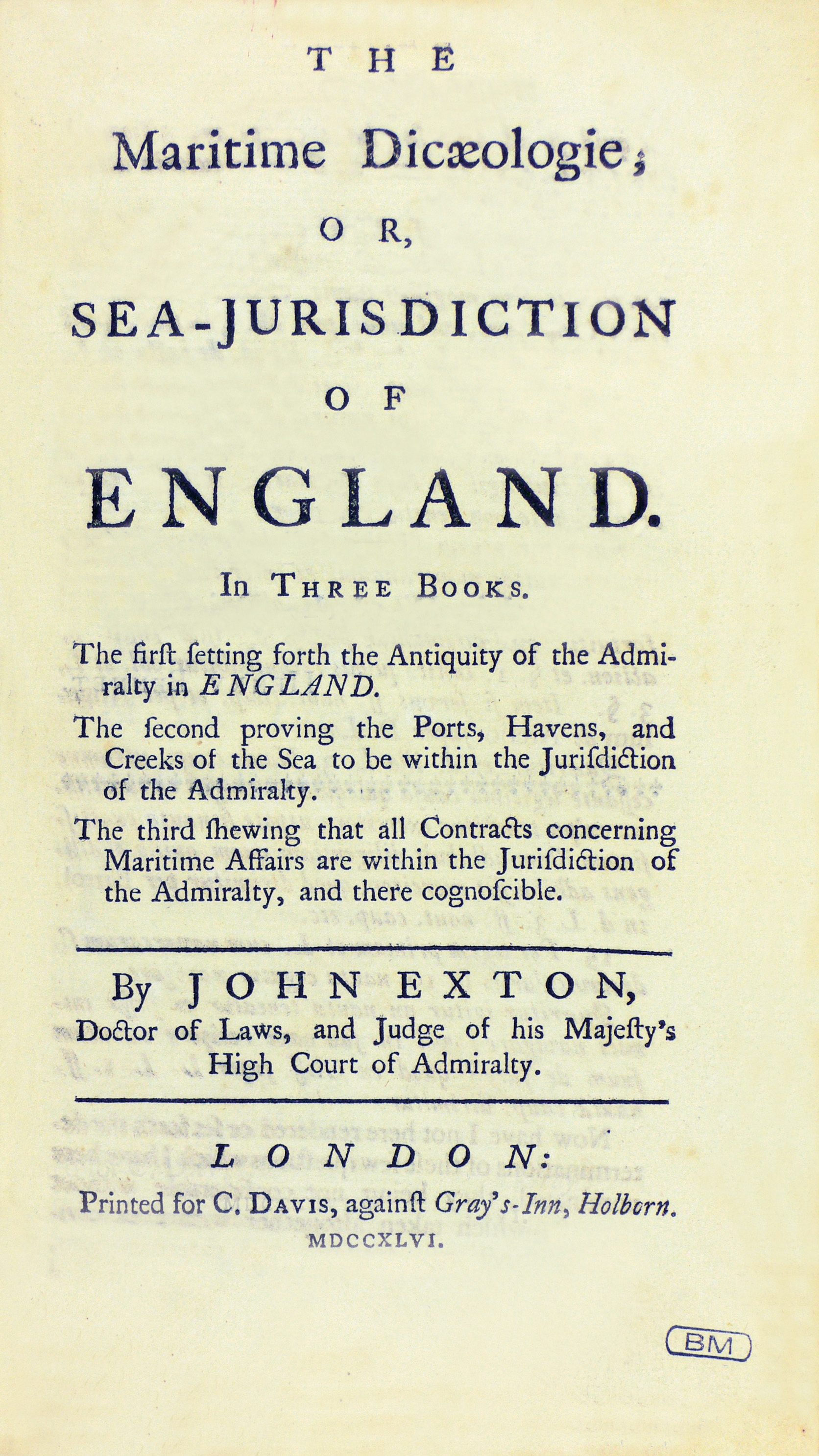
The maritime dicaeologie, 1746.

John Exton (c. 1600 – c. 1669) was an English admiralty lawyer. He served as Judge of the High Court of Admiralty from 1648 to 1651 and again from 1661 to 1668.

== Life ==
Exton was educated at Trinity Hall, Cambridge, where he proceeded B.A. 1619–30, M.A. 1623, LL.D. 1634. In 1649 he was appointed by the parliament judge of the court of admiralty, and in this office he was confirmed and reappointed by the Duke of York after the Restoration. Exton died about 1669.

== Works ==
Exton wrote The Maritime Dicæologie, or Sea Jurisdiction of England, set forth in three several books, 1664; 2nd ed. 1755. It was written chiefly to maintain the jurisdiction of his court.

== Family ==
He was married and had a family. A son Thomas Exton was also known as a lawyer. John Exton, perhaps an older son, entered Merchant Taylors' School on 11 September 1628.
