= Edward Hales (MP for Hythe) =

English Member of Parliament

Edward Hales (1630-1696), of Chilston, Boughton Malherbe, Kent, was an English Member of Parliament (MP).

He was a Member of the Parliament of England for Hythe in October 1679, 1681 and 1689.
