= Phineas Andrews =

English politician

Phineas Andrews (ca. 1600 – 23 September 1661) was an English politician who sat in the House of Commons from 1660 to 1661.

Andrews was the son of William Andrews of Evesham and Little Hampton, Worcestershire and his wife Mary Phineas, daughter of William Phineas of Coventry. He became a London merchant and in 1645 purchased the manor of Little Berkhamsted, Hertfordshire from Frances Weld, widow of Sir John Weld. In 1654, he was tasked by the government to give protection to fisheries by building wharfs, docks, and storehouses, drawing on the salt duties and other customs, and excise duties which were remitted to him. In 1655, Andrews sold Little Berkhamsted to George Nevill and in 1658 acquired the manor of Denton, Kent from John Percival.

In 1660, Andrews was elected Member of Parliament for Hythe in the Convention Parliament. He was re-elected MP for Hythe in 1661 for the Cavalier Parliament but died later in the year.

Andrews died in 1661 and was buried at Denton church where there is a monument to his memory.

Andrews married Mildred Fanshaw, daughter of John Fanshaw and his wife Elizabeth Wiseman. His daughter Elizabeth married Sir Thomas Wolstenholme.
