= John Honywood (MP for Hythe) =

English Member of Parliament

John Honywood (by 1466-1534 or later), of Hythe and Honywood in Postling, Kent, was an English Member of Parliament (MP). He was the son of MP, Thomas Honywood.

He was a Member of the Parliament of England for Hythe in 1504 and 1510.
