= Stephen Rye =

Stephen Rye (fl. 1410–1417), of Hythe, Kent, was an English Member of Parliament (MP).

He was a Member of the Parliament of England for Hythe in 1410, February 1413, May 1413, April 1414 and 1417. He was the father of Richard Rye.
