= Heyman baronets =

Extinct baronetcy in the Baronetage of England

The Heyman Baronetcy, of Somerfield in the County of Kent, was a title in the Baronetage of England. It was created on 12 August 1641 for Henry Heyman, member of parliament for Hythe. The title became extinct on the death of the fifth baronet in 1808.

== Heyman baronets, of Somerfield (1641) ==
- Sir Henry Heyman, 1st Baronet (1610–1658)
- Sir Peter Heyman, 2nd Baronet (1642–1723)
- Sir Bartolomew Heyman, 3rd Baronet (c. 1690–1742)
- Sir Peter Heyman, 4th Baronet (c. 1720–1790)
- Sir Henry Pix Heyman, 5th Baronet (died 1808)
