= William Canoun =

William Canoun (fl. 1411–1414), of Hythe, Kent, was an English Member of Parliament (MP).

He was a Member of the Parliament of England for Hythe in 1411 and April 1414.
