= Julius Deedes =

English Member of Parliament

Julius Deedes (c. 1635-1692), of Hythe, Kent, was an English Member of Parliament (MP).

He was a Member of the Parliament of England for Hythe in March 1679, 3 April - 4 June 1685 and 1689.
