= 25 Park Lane =

Coordinates: 51.506°N 0.151°W

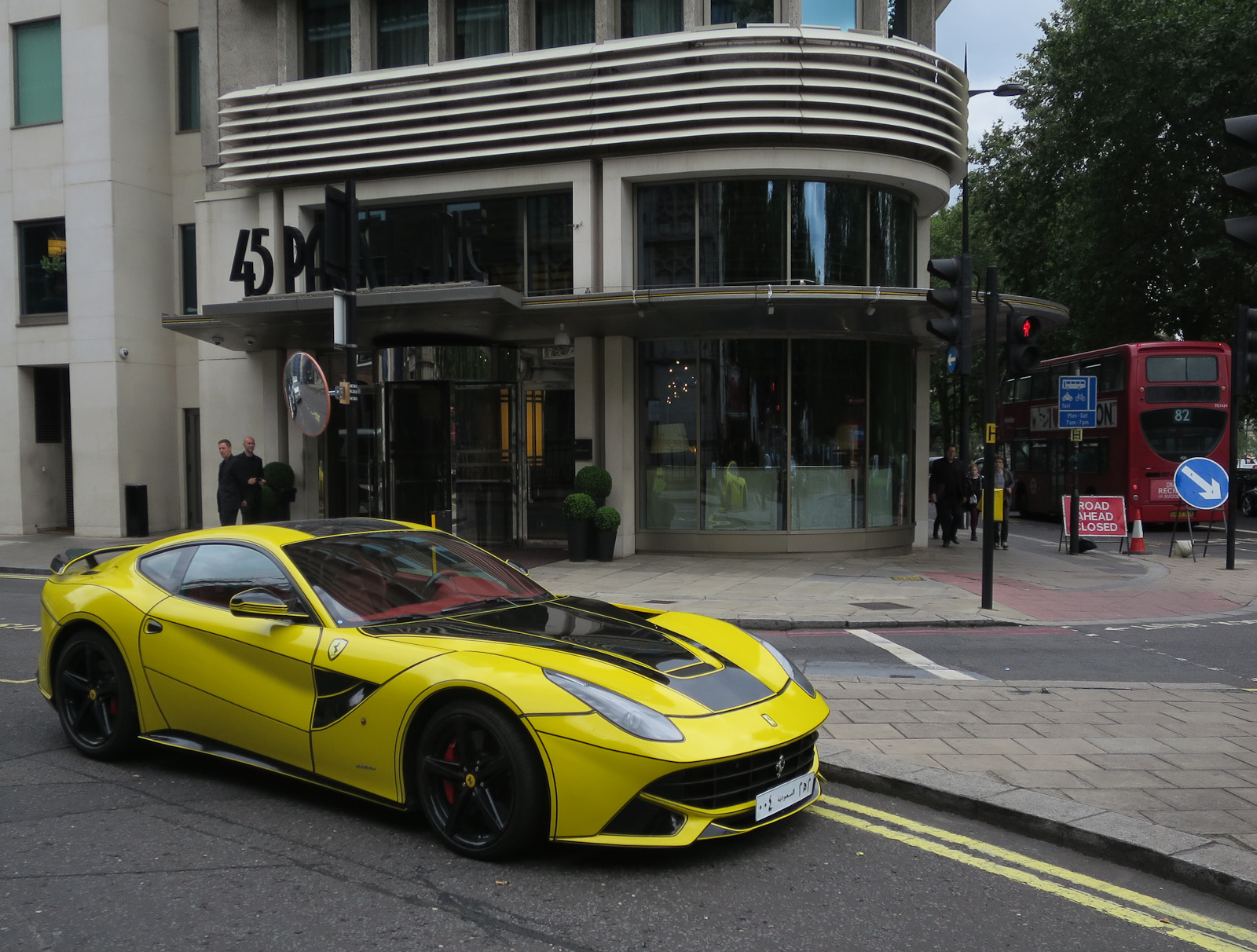
45 Park Lane in 2016

25 Park Lane (later renumbered to 45) is a building on Park Lane, London.

25 Park Lane was the London residence of Sir Philip Sassoon who also owned Port Lympne Mansion and Trent Park. His Park Lane home was previously owned by his parents Edward Sassoon and Aline Caroline de Rothschild. It was by all accounts a great town house and a very suitable venue for entertaining. Built in 1895-6 by T. H.Smith and C. E. Sayer for Barney Barnato, a South African, the house was 13,000 square feet. Peter Stansky author describes the house as having had a four-story-high marble staircase, a conservatory, a winter garden and a ballroom.

Previously decorated by his mother Lady Sassoon after the First World War he undertook extensive changes filling the house with French Furniture, tapestries and his most important paintings. Sassoon employed Philip Tilden, who later worked for him at both Port Lympne and Trent Park, to reconstruct the interior. Tilden's memoirs record his efforts; "I built a recessed gallery, mirrored with glass the colour of oyster. I can assure you that deep red roses in porphyry vases reflected in black glass give an effect that is not without uniqueness". The ballroom was painted by Jose Maria Sert who also painted a room at Port Lympne Mansion. In 1920 Peter Stanksky notes that Sassoon commissioned him to do the room, despite the distress the Port Lympne Mansion rooms had bought on. The work was entitled Caravans of the East which covered the walls with Greek temples of camels, palm trees, elephants and exotic figures on their way through a desert. The work extended to the ceiling, on which he painted clouds and an opening for the sky. The panels, except for the ceiling, were saved and were eventually purchased by Barcelona City Council and are now in the Museum of Modern Art in Barcelona.

It was renumbered 45 in 1934, and is now a hotel.

== Sources ==
- Tilden, Philip (1954). True Remembrances: The memoirs of an architect. London: Country Life. OCLC 636818090.
