= Shorncliffe Lodge =

House in Sandgate, Kent, England

- Interactive map of the Shorncliffe Lodge area

General information
- Location: Sandgate, United Kingdom
- Coordinates: 51°4′28.7″N 1°8′33.2″E

Design and construction
- Designations: Grade II listed

Shorncliffe Lodge in Sandgate, Kent, was a well appointed weekend house that belonged to Edward Albert Sassoon and Aline Caroline de Rothschild. It was sold in 1912 by Philip Sassoon to fund the purchase of land on which he built Port Lympne Mansion.

== History ==
The property was purchased in 1912 following Edward Sassoon's successful election in a by-election at Hythe, Kent, a constituency previously represented by Meyer de Rothschild from 1859 to 1874. The area had established associations with the Rothschild family, who were connected with a number of properties along the Undercliff at Sandgate, Kent. Sassoon’s in-laws had owned property in the area since the early nineteenth century, using it as a staging point for couriers and carrier pigeons communicating with the Continent.

The parents of Admiral of the Fleet Sir Roger Keyes resided at Shorncliffe Lodge. In 1921, the Freemasons' Lodge of St Mark No. 6969 was established at the property.

In 1974, Shorncliffe Lodge was designated a Grade II listed building.

== Description ==
Shorncliffe Lodge is a Grade II listed house in Sandgate, Kent.
