= Port Lympne Mansion =

Coordinates: 51.07565°N 0.99958°E

Port Lympne
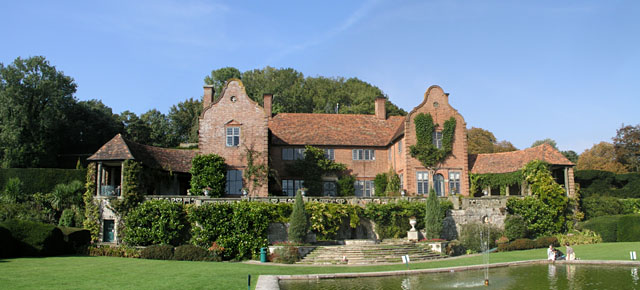
- Port Lympne
- Interactive map of the Port Lympne area
- Former names: Belcaire

General information
- Type: Country House
- Architectural style: Cape Dutch architecture
- Location: Lympne, United Kingdom
- Construction started: 1913
- Client: Philip Sassoon
- Landlord: The Aspinall Foundation

Technical details
- Material: Red Brick

Design and construction
- Architects: Herbert Baker, Philip Tilden and others
- Designations: Grade II* listed

Port Lympne, at Lympne, Kent is an early 20th-century country house built for Sir Philip Sassoon, 3rd Baronet by Herbert Baker and Philip Tilden. Completed after the First World War. Following Sassoon's death in 1939 it was bequeathed with its contents, including cars and planes, to Hannah Gubbay, his cousin. It was abandoned after the Second World War. In 1973, it was purchased by John Aspinall as part of an expansion of his Port Lympne Zoo. The house is a Grade II* listed building as of 29 December 1966.

== History ==
Sir Philip Sassoon, 3rd Baronet, GBE, CMG, purchased the estate in 1913 with the proceeds of the sale of his parents' home (Aline Caroline de Rothschild and Edward Albert Sassoon), Shorncliffe Lodge, in Sandgate, Kent." The family is a scion of a family of wealthy Iraqi merchants.

=== The mansion ===
As the MP for Hythe Philip Sassoon commissioned Sir Herbert Baker to design the house in the Cape Dutch architecture style. It was built for him around 1913/4 "on a superb site looking across Romney Marsh to the sea." Originally named Belcaire, it was renamed Port Lympne after the First World War, echoing Portus Lemanis, a Roman port that was situated nearby. When work recommenced after the end of the War, Sassoon employed Philip Tilden, who also worked for Sassoon's political friends and colleagues, David Lloyd George and Winston Churchill. "Tilden's job was to enlarge Port Lympne and to make it, in his words, "no more of the modest weekend home, but rather the epitome of all things conductive to luxurious relaxation after the strenuousness of war. It was to be a challenge to the world, telling people that a new culture had risen up from the sick-bed of the old, with new aspirations, eyes upon a new aspect, mind turned to a new burst of imagination."

Tilden's additions and alterations during the early 1920s included doorcases, the east forecourt, the terraces, and the amazing external staircase leading to the pool. Internally the ground floor of the passageway, from east to west is decorated with patterned black and white marble in varying concentric curves with a barrel-vaulted ceiling. The staircase is flanked by blue marble columns and pink on the first floor. The iron balustrade to the stairs was copied from the principal stair at Caroline Park, Scotland. Sir Philip Sassoon thought it a moderate house, yet it had 4 reception rooms, 2 libraries, 13 principal bedrooms, eight bathrooms as well as 17 staff bedrooms with a further 5 bathrooms.

=== The grounds ===
The Italian style terraced garden was designed and executed under the guidance of Philip Tilden, these works started after 1918. Tilden added a bachelor's wing with Moorish courtyard, which Lady Honor Channon, (wife of Henry Channon), unkindly described as a Spanish brothel to accommodate young airmen from nearby Romney Marsh flying field – among his other enthusiasms, Sir Philip was himself an aviator – and Tilden's twin swimming pools and monumentally classical garden staircase, a grand flight of steps, crowned with temples (letter removed), led up the cliff at the side of the house were in much the same theatrical spirit. Philip Sassoon thought highly enough of Tilden to recommend him to Churchill to work on his country house Chartwell in Kent.

Cut out of the old sea cliffs there are 15.5 acres (6.3 ha) of gardens. William Bainbridge Reynolds, who had designed the metal work for the Law Courts, undertook all of the wrought-ironwork in and around the mansion . The garden planting was designed by Norah Lindsay, who recreated the feel of Italy by setting herbaceous plants against the dark background created by the terraced hedges. Norah also advised Philip on his Trent Park garden, which was 13 miles (21 km) from the center of London in New Barnet. When John Aspinall (zoo owner) purchased the house in 1973 he began a ten-year renovation project. The great border which is 135 yards (123 m) in all was dug over twice by hand and piled with 200 tons of Elephant dung and were redesigned and replanted with 2,500 herbs and shrubs with the advice of Russell Page.

The water used for the gardens comes from natural springs. A ram system pumps the water 300 feet (91 m) up to a storage reservoir holding approximately 15,000 imperial gallons (68,000 L; 18,000 US gal). Three hydraulic rams work together, driven entirely by water pressure. The system is designed to ensure there is natural fresh water for the gardens throughout the summer, even during a long drought.

The main drive to the mansion was from the east gate (opposite Otterpool Lane) so visitors could enjoy views towards the Romney Marsh.

=== Artists commissioned to work in and around the house ===
- Rex Whistler decorated the Tent Room, which is still painted in the 1920s. "Rex now hit on the right treatment. He would turn the room (the dining-room had a central door at each end and windows on one side only, also a barrel-vaulted ceiling of complex curves) into a blue-and-white striped tent. It would seem to have been put up between two doorcases of stone and be looked into by windows at the back. These would have real curtains of the same stripes, exactly matching the painted material stretched in wrinkled trompe-l'œil across the curvy ceiling." "On the main wall real tent poles (half round) should be topped with real cords, bows, and tassels of gold braid Every chance of a trick should be taken, in this game between the real and the imagined." "Also he would lift the whole room, or tent, as it to the first-floor level of the pictured scene outside, so that we look down between the tent poles on a town with several favorite buildings – a Palladian Bridge, A Stowe pavilion, St Martin-in-the-Fields. There are no spiders, there being no children, but there are several quiet jokes. The lady's country house, far off, is Faringdon, and the little boy waiting for the paddle steamer has a coroneted B on his trunk, for Berners, the eternal schoolboy. M. Stulik, the proprietor, stands at the door of "La Tour Eiffel", where Rex and his friends often dined. It is all another metaphor for the ideal: an urban version of a golden age, and mostly very English, with here a very Roman church and procession, and there a canal that shoots away to outpace even Le Notre. Ideal worlds can afford to mix metaphors". "At last Rex braced himself to ask £800 for painting the entire room".
- Glyn Philpot who undertook a series of friezes which are still on show within the house now
- Josep Maria Sert -a Catalan artist who not only designed sets for Serge Diaghilev for the Ballets Russes (Russian Ballet) but also decorated the Waldorf-Astoria in New York, and, in 1930, the Rockefeller Center to replace murals by Diego Rivera- decorated the first room on the left in 1914–15. The drawing room painting was entitled an "Allegory of War in moss-brown and gold", with a frescoed ceiling and "elephants trampling the chimney-piece and the German eagle violently defeathered". Sert's murals were in due course painted out. "They had, however, served as an appropriate backdrop to the discussions which preceded the Treaty of Versailles." The room is now decorated with murals by Arthur Spencer Roberts commissioned by John Aspinall. Josep Maria Sert also decorated the ballroom at No. 25 Park Lane turning it into a desert oasis. Sir Philip Sassoon's Park Lane Ballroom is now at the Museu Nacional d'Art de Catalunya in Barcelona.
- The mosaic work is probably all by Miss Gertrude Martin "she recently did a couple of small niches in a house for Sir Philip Sassoon. She prefers to do her work on the spot, rather than in the modern way of making the mosaic in cement and then putting it into position". Mosaics remain in the two niches either side of the two front doors, in Philip's bathroom on the ground floor and in two of the upstairs bathrooms. Her work can also be seen in Belfast Cathedral, the House of Commons and in Westminster Cathedral.
- Edwin Lutyens and John Singer Sargent
- Howard Coster a British photographer.

=== Visitors to the house ===
August was the month for entertaining. Visitors to the house included the actors Charlie Chaplin, T. E. Lawrence. Royalty Edward, Prince of Wales and Mrs Simpson, the Duke of York Lord Louis Mountbatten, Lord Curzon, Lord Rocksavage, who was married to Sybil Sassoon, Philip's sister and a Romanian aristocrat, Princess Marthe Bibesco, a prolific author of novels and memoirs; another novelist, Alice Dudeney; George Bernard Shaw, and Osbert Sitwell Giles Lytton Strachey, a British writer and critic; Sir Harold Nicolson KCVO CMG, an English diplomat, author, diarist and politician along with the writers Vita Sackville-West; Marie Adelaide Belloc Lowndes and Maurice Baring. Politicians included Sir Douglas Haig, Sir Winston Churchill and his wife Clementine, Prime Minister Asquith, David Lloyd George and Alexandre Millerand; Then there were sports personalities which included Georges Carpentier, a French boxer and the composer Ethel Smyth, Philip's old teacher from Eton.

=== Other owners/ occupiers of the mansion ===
- On the death of Sir Philip Sassoon the mansion passed to his cousin Hannah Gubbay.
- In 1942 the house was commandeered by the Royal Air Force, the Free Czech Troops "wreaked havoc on that fastidious connoisseur's 'Rothschild-Levantine' decorations and totally destroyed the famous elephant paintings by Sert in the drawing room which were the finest example of 1920s Parisian decorative art in England" installed by Philip Sassoon.
- In 1946 the mansion was purchased by Colonel Waite and Mrs Waite.
- John Aspinall (zoo owner) saw Port Lympne Mansion on a cold morning in 1973. "I fell under its strange spell. Here was a house, a park and a garden that had 'died' suddenly at the outbreak of war in 1939. For thirty-five years the estate had fallen into limbo. Since the end of the war no one had lived in the mansion and the once famous gardens which used to employ fourteen full-time gardeners were in the sole care of a part-time OAP. Fortunately about half of the interiors of the house had survived the wartime influx of Czech pilots and the 'alterations of subsequent owners. We embarked on a 10-year program to restore the house and gardens, and have nearly completed this. In an age that rejects quality and style we intend to guard both – always bearing in mind the taste and discernment of Port Lympne's progenitor Sir Philip Sassoon. We would rather work slowly and well, using skilled craftsmen and artisans, than complete in a hurry just to attract large numbers of visitors prematurely".
- The Aspinall Foundation has sympathetically, and with the consent of English Heritage, converted the Grade II* listed building (only 5.5% of listed buildings are Grade II*) Mansion into a hotel to help raise funds for the conservation and preservation of wild animals which takes place within Port Lympne Reserve and its sister park Howletts Wild Animal Park. The hotel opened on 13 June 2014, with all of the four bedrooms and two suites named after the visitors to the mansion, those who created it and of course Sir Philip Sassoon.

=== Other properties ===
Philip Sassoon's other homes included Trent Park and 25 Park Lane (London) and for many years he was the Speyside tenant of the Seafield Estates.

== Bibliography ==
- Stansky, Peter. Sassoon. The worlds of Philip and Sybil. PUBLISHER: Yalebooks. ISBN 0-300-09547-3.
- Clive Aslet. The Last Country Houses (1982) PUBLISHER: Yale University Press New Haven and London ISBN 0-300-03474-1
- Norah Lindsay: the life and art of a garden designer PUBLISHER: Francis Lincoln ISBN 978-0-7112-2524-4
- The Lost Mansions of Mayfair by Oliver Bradbury. PUBLISHER: Historical Publications ISBN 978-1-905286-23-2
- Churchill & Chartwell: The Untold Story of Churchill's Houses and Gardens (Google eBook) ISBN 978-0-711225-35-0
- Lush and Luxurious: The Life and Work of Philip Tilden 1887–1956 by James Bettley. PUBLISHER: Royal Institute of British Architects
- The Laughter and the Urn: The Life of Rex Whistler by Laurence Whistler. PUBLISHER: Weidenfeld Paperbacks ISBN 978-0297-79021-1
- Ettie: The Intimate Life And Dauntless Spirit Of Lady Desborough by Richard Davenport-Hines ISBN 978-0297-85622-1
- Country Life, 53 (19 May 1923), pp 678–84; 66 (19 October 1929), pp 513–17; 72 (10 September 1932), pp 285–7; 79 (14 March 1936), pp 276–82
- The Sassoons by Standley Jackson William. PUBLISHER: Heinemann Ltd ISBN 978-0-434-37056-6
- In Search of Rex Whistler: His Life and His Work by Mirabel Cecil and Hugh Cecil. PUBLISHER: Francis Lincoln ISBN 978-0711232303
- Tony's war:the life and times of a WW2 Typhoon pilot, by Britta von Zweigbergk. pp 164 9781843862918. PUBLISHER: Pegasus Elliot Mackenzie (2007)
