= Rüdiger von Heyking =

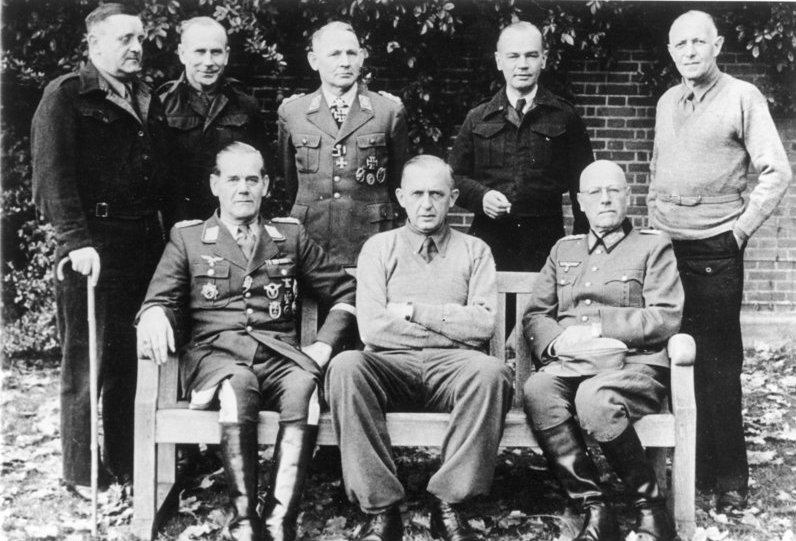
Rüdiger von Heyking in Allied captivity at Trent Park, seated on the left

Rüdiger von Heyking (10 January 1894 – 18 February 1956) was a German officer and Lieutenant General of the Luftwaffe during World War II.

== Life ==
Heyking was born to a noble family in Rastenburg, East Prussia, at the home of Heyking family.

He joined the cadet corps in 1914 as second lieutenant in the 85th Infantry Regiment "Duke of Holstein". At the outbreak of the First World War, Heyking served on the Western Front where he first trained as and then was appointed company commander. He graduated from the Air Force observer training course on 30 January 1918.

Between September 1942 and November 1943, he commanded the 6th Luftwaffe Field Division on the Eastern Front. From May 1944 he was commander of the 6th Luftwaffe Parachute Division in France. He and two other general officers were captured in September of that year in Mons, Belgium during the German retreat from France.

He spent part of his captivity in Trent Park, a specially supervised internment camp for high-ranking officers. After the war, he was illegally turned over to the Soviet Army and imprisoned in the Soviet Union. He was not released from Soviet imprisonment until 1955, and died in Bad Godesberg in 1956.

== Awards ==
- Iron Cross (1914) 1st and 2nd Class
- Prussian Military Observer Badge
- Prussian Military Pilot Badge
- Wound Bage (1918) in Black
- Clasp to the Iron Cross Classes I and II
- German Cross in Gold, on 26 December 1943

== Literature ==
- Karl-Friedrich Hildebrand: Die Generale der deutschen Luftwaffe 1935–1945 Band 2: Habermehl bis Nuber, Biblio Verlag, Osnabrück 1992, ISBN 3-7648-2207-4
