= Trent Park Cemetery =

Cemetery in Enfield, Greater London

Coordinates: 51.65287°N 0.1486°W

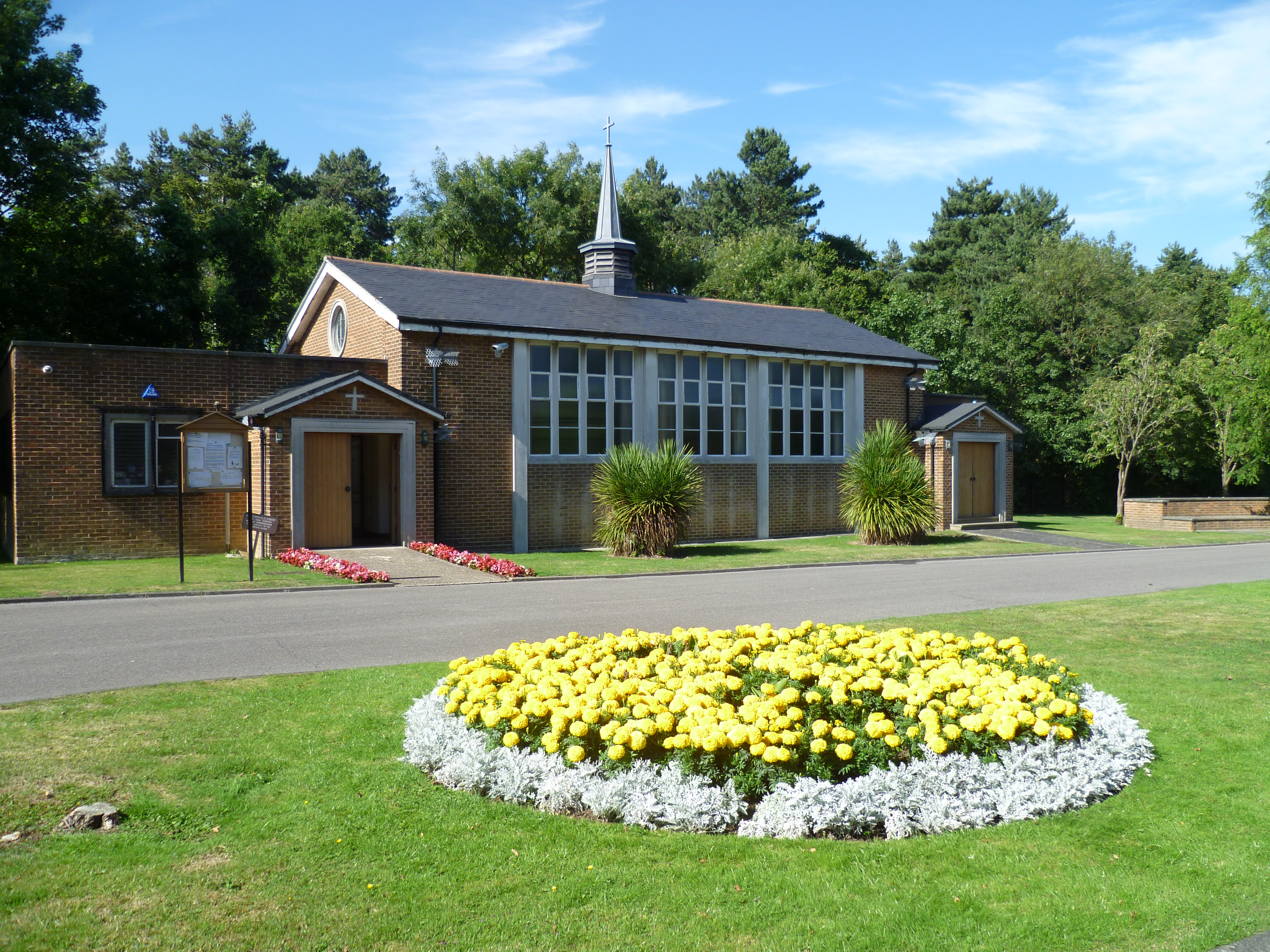
Trent Park Cemetery chapel

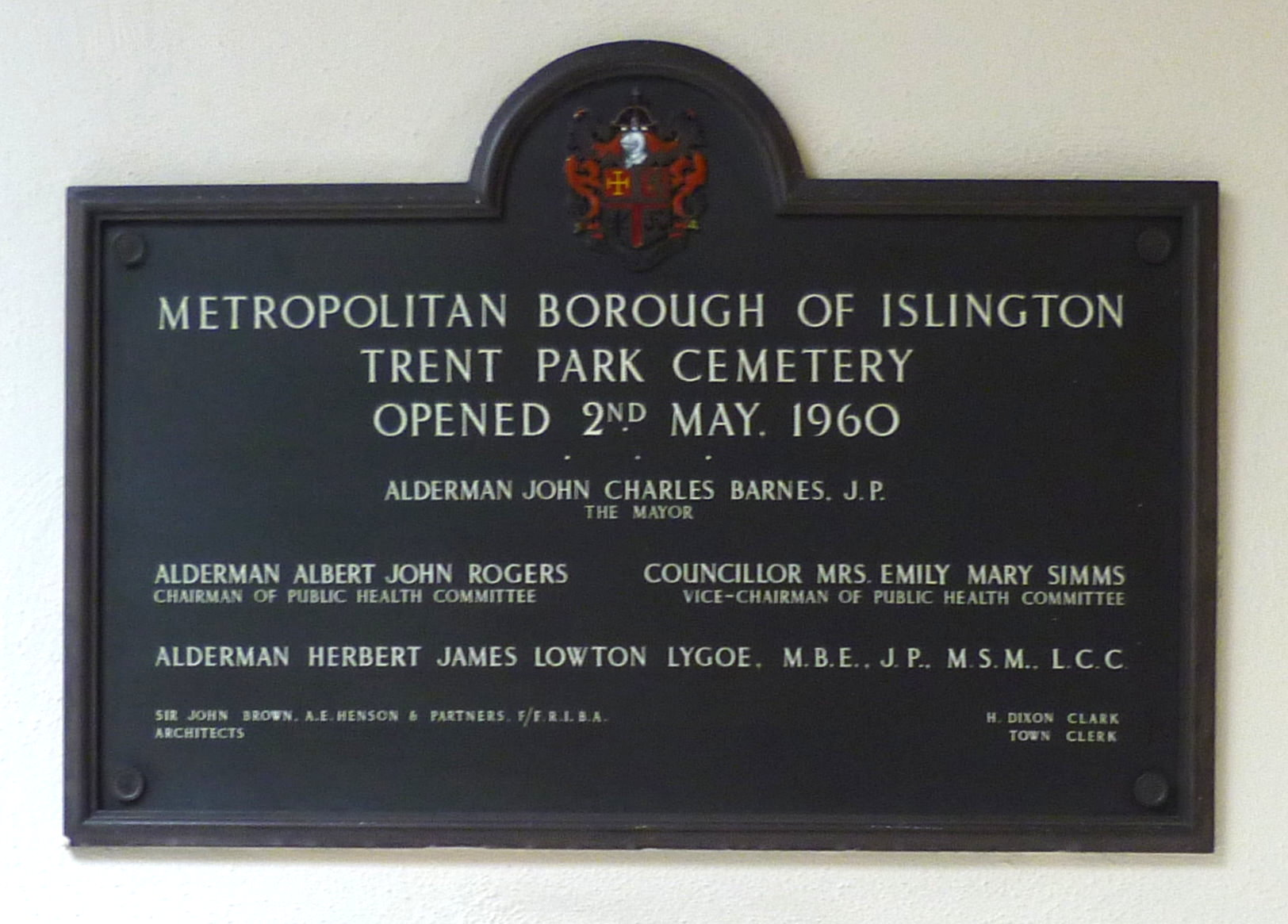
Plaque marking the opening of the cemetery

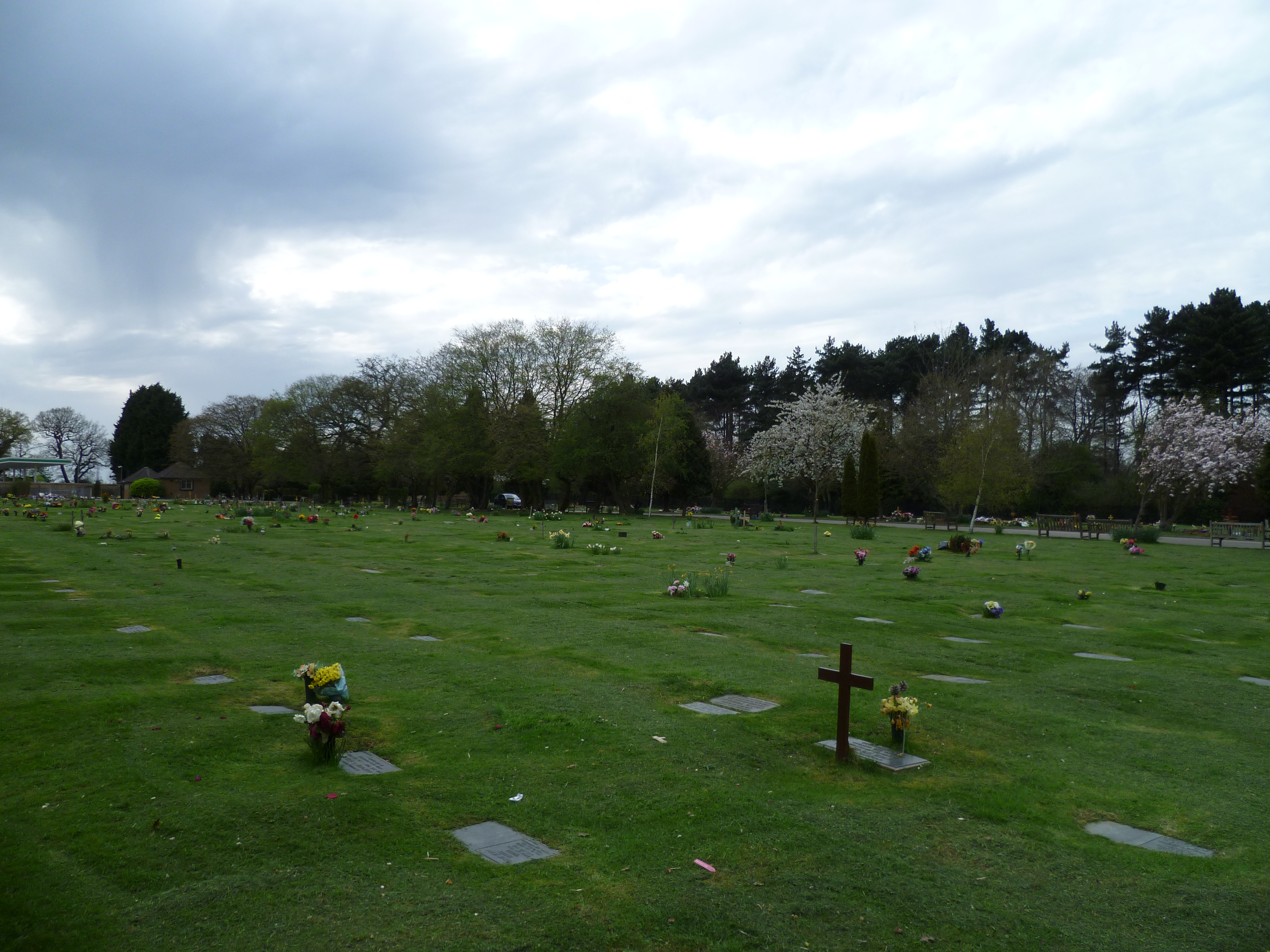
View of graves

Trent Park Cemetery is a cemetery in Cockfosters Road, Cockfosters, north London. The cemetery, which is run by Islington and Camden Cemetery Services, is adjacent to Cockfosters tube station and Trent Park.

== Style ==
The cemetery is of a lawn style with only bronze or granite memorial plaques laid flat allowed.

== History ==
Trent Park Cemetery was opened in 1960. It was built on land in agricultural use within Trent Park that originally formed part of Enfield Chase hunting park.
