= The Wehrmacht =

- Genre: Documentary
- Country of origin: Germany
- Original language: German
- No. of series: 1
- No. of episodes: 5

Production
- Producer: Cinecentrum Production
- Running time: 50 minutes

Original release
- Network: ZDF
- Release: 2007

The Wehrmacht is a 5 part documentary that provides differentiated answers on the Wehrmacht role in the World War II based on the latest historical and comprehensive investigative research, bringing many new facts to light, among them documents proving for the first time ever, what many among the officers actually thought from Trent Park operation archives.

== Episode list ==
1. The Blitzkrieg
2. The Turning Point
3. The Crimes
4. Resistance
5. To the Bitter End
