= Allianze University College of Medical Sciences =

University college in Penang, Malaysia

Coordinates: 5.5155°N 100.4393°E

Allianze University College of Medical Sciences was a private higher learning institution situated in Kepala Batas, Pulau Pinang. The college offered courses in various fields such as medicine, hospitality, tourism, sports science, and allied health sciences. However, it closed in 2014 due to protests from unpaid staff and an unsuccessful attempt to establish a branch in London, England.

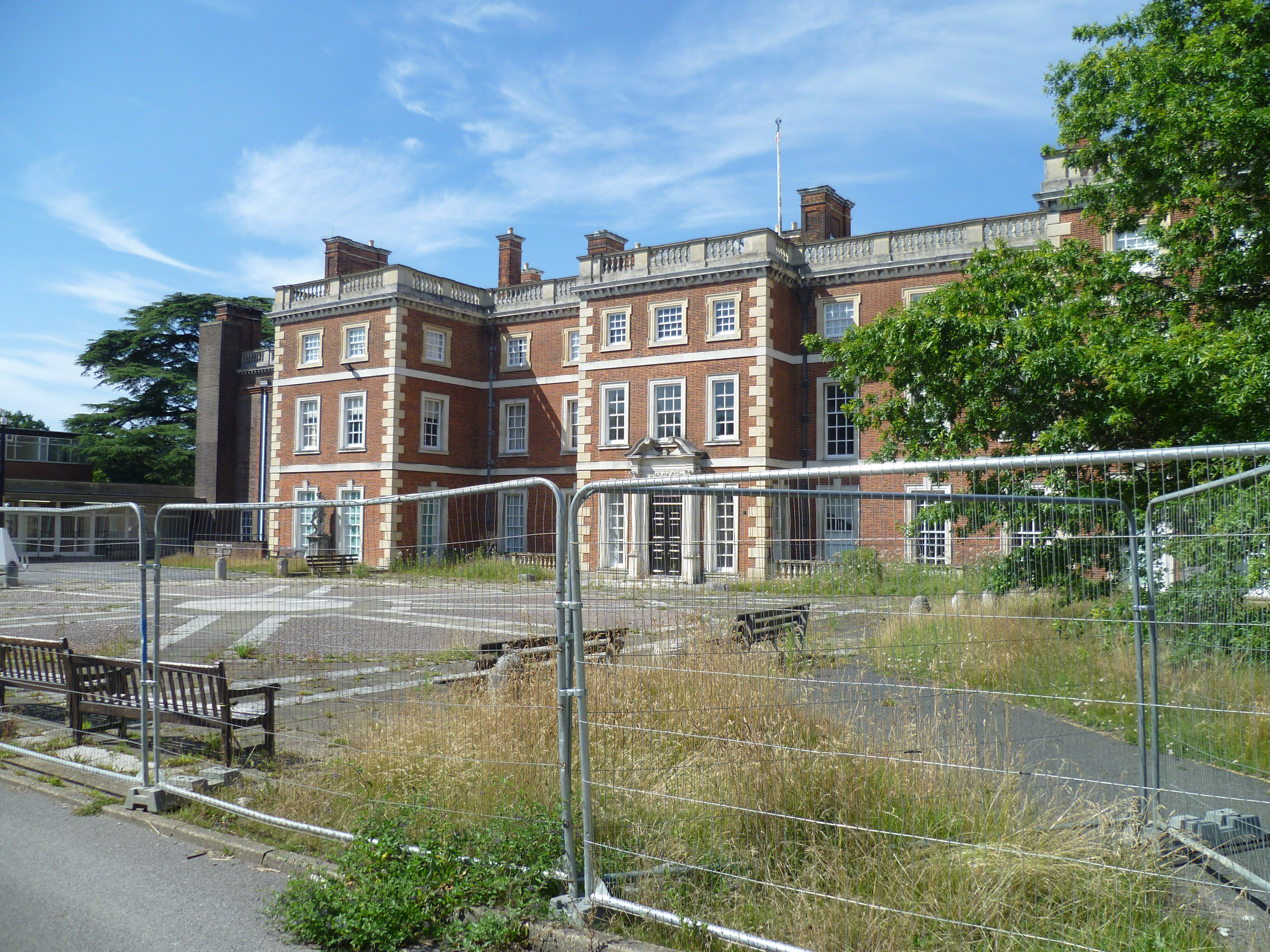
The unoccupied Trent Park House in August 2015.

In 2013, the university acquired Trent Park House in north London from Middlesex University for £30 million (US$47 million). Unfortunately, the building and campus were never developed, and the closure of the college in 2014 is speculated to have been partly influenced by the magnitude of the deal. Subsequently, Trent Park House was sold to Berkeley Homes.

As of today, the institution has already ceased operations.
