= Frances Stevenson =

Spouse of David Lloyd George (1888–1972)

Francess Lloyd George CBE
- Countess Lloyd-George of Dwyfor
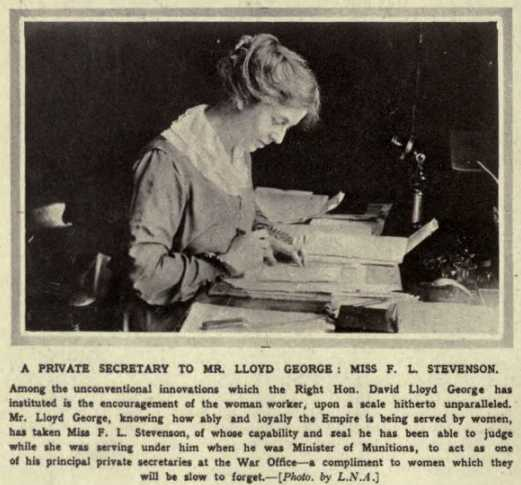
- Tenure: 1 January 1945 – 26 March 1945
- Predecessor: none
- Successor: Winifred Emily Peedle
- Born: Frances Louise Stevenson; 7 October 1888
- Died: 5 December 1972 (aged 84)
- Spouse: David Lloyd George, 1st Earl Lloyd-George of Dwyfor (m. 1943; died 1945)
- Issue: 1

Frances Lloyd George, Countess Lloyd-George of Dwyfor, CBE (née Stevenson; 7 October 1888 – 5 December 1972) was a British woman who was the mistress, personal secretary, confidante and second wife of British Prime Minister David Lloyd George.

== Early life ==
Louise Frances Stevenson was born in Kennington, then in Surrey, the daughter of John Stevenson (1858–1946) and Louise Augustine Armanino (1868–1945), of mixed French and Italian extraction. John's father John (1818–77) had been born in Douglas, Lanarkshire. She was educated at Clapham High School, where in the fifth form she had made friends with Mair, Lloyd George's eldest daughter, and then at Royal Holloway College where she studied Classics.

== Governess ==
In July 1911, Lloyd George, then Chancellor of the Exchequer, hired Stevenson as a governess for his youngest daughter Megan. Lloyd George and Stevenson were soon attracted to each other. Although Stevenson, who wanted a conventional marriage and many children, hesitated about becoming the mistress of a married man, she agreed to become Lloyd George's personal secretary on his terms, which included a sexual relationship, in 1913.

She was created a Commander of the Order of the British Empire in the 1918 New Year Honours and accompanied Lloyd George to the Paris Peace Conference of 1919. The delegates were under the impression she was still just his secretary. In 1921 she wrote a series of articles about the delegates to the conference for The Sunday Times, which were collected and published by Cassells as Makers of the New World under the pseudonym "One Who Knows Them". Stevenson chose the location and supervised the construction of Lloyd George's house Bron-y-de in Churt, Surrey. She also arranged and collated Lloyd George's extensive archive of personal and political papers so that he could write his War Memoirs.

== Child of disputed paternity ==
After having had two abortions, Stevenson gave birth to a daughter, Jennifer, in 1929. Stevenson had been having an affair with Thomas F. Tweed, a novelist and Liberal Party official. Stevenson encouraged Lloyd George to believe the child was his, but it is more likely that her father was Tweed.

== Marriage ==
Two years after Lloyd George's wife Margaret died, Stevenson married Lloyd George on 23 October 1943 despite the disapproval of Lloyd George's children from his first marriage. In 1942, Lloyd George and Frances had bought Tŷ Newydd in his home village of Llanystumdwy near Criccieth and initiated a major renovation by the architect Clough Williams-Ellis. In 1944 the couple moved into Tŷ Newydd. Less than 18 months after their marriage, Lloyd George died on 26 March 1945, with Frances and his daughter Megan at his bedside.

== Dowager Countess ==
As Dowager Countess Lloyd-George of Dwyfor, she lived at Churt for the rest of her life, devoting her time to her family, charitable activities, perpetuating the memory of Lloyd George and writing. Her memoir The Years That Are Past was published in 1967, and her diary of her life with Lloyd George was published in 1971.
