= Bron-y-de =

Country house in Surrey, England

Coordinates: 51.1453°N 0.750872°W

Bron-y-de (transl. 'Breast of the south') was a house and surrounding farm in the village of Churt in the southern English county of Surrey. The main house was designed by Philip Tilden for the former British Prime Minister David Lloyd George in 1922.

The house and farm were situated on 60 acres of land bought by Lloyd George from Roland Cubitt, 3rd Baron Ashcombe as part of the sale of Ashcombe's 2,000 acre Churt estate in 1921. Lloyd George added to the estate until it reached some 700 acres. Though the local scrub land was unsuitable for farming, Lloyd George established a successful fruit and pig farm at Bron-y-de and sold excess produce at his own farm shop. A water diviner travelled from Wales to the farm and found a source of irrigation underground. Lloyd George's private secretary A. J. Sylvester was dismissive of Lloyd George's managerial and financial abilities regarding his ownership of Bron-y-de, writing in 1940 that 'Churt becomes a bigger mystery to me every day. Nobody knows what are the true facts about the financial aspect. The agricultural aspect is totally mucked up and discontent is rife amongst all the staff. It is an unhappy place and is a cemetery to many an innocent and enthusiastic person'.

With the assumption of Lloyd George's occupation of Bron-y-de, Tilden wrote that the 'centre of the political universe was moved from London'. Lloyd George's mistress, Frances Stevenson lived nearby at 'Avalon', overlooking the orchards of Bron-y-de, having previously occupied the 'Old Barn', a former farm building. A timber bungalow, 'Avalon' was designed for Stevenson by the modernist architect Anthony Chitty. Tilden’s undoubted skills did not prevent him making practical mistakes, and falling out with many of his clients. Thomas Jones, visiting Bron-y-de in 1926 noted; “Tilden forgot to put a scullery at Churt: what he forgot at Chartwell I did not discover because he was a subject to be avoided.” C. P. Scott, the editor of the Manchester Guardian and a long-standing associate of Lloyd George, described a visit to Churt in his diary entry for 2–3 February 1924, shortly after the purchase of the estate. "Lloyd George has bought a delightful little property, mainly unspoilt woodland, of about 70 acres and he took us all around and about it. He joked about the coming revolution against which it is to serve as a retreat".

The house as first built was not large; Tilden, in his memoir True Remembrances, described it as, "a modest house [with] one large room, a modest staff, a handful of bedrooms and many loggias and balconies". Within a year, Tilden was recalled to make extensions, including the enlargement of existing bedrooms, the provision of new ones, and the construction of a new dining room. (Note: Tilden's memoirs must be treated with some caution, his biographer James Bettley described them as "highly unreliable".) Bron-y-de was the subject of the main article of the 4 November 1922 issue of Country Life. The architect and engineer Owen Williams installed a large panoramic window at Bron-y-de at Lloyd George's behest following the latter's visit to Adolf Hitler's Berghof residence at Obersalzberg in the Bavarian Alps which featured a similar window. The library at Bron-y-de was the largest room in the house at 36 ft in length with a curved ceiling. A mural painted by John Churchill of the Gulf of Tigullio dominated one end of the library.

Several amateur films of Lloyd-George at Bron-y-de are in the collection of the National Screen and Sound Archive of Wales. A 1938 film shows a new apiary and 'larch gathering' at Bron-y-de. Honey from the apiary at Bron-y-de was later sold at Harrods. Lloyd George was President of the British Beekeepers Association from 1939 until 1943.

Another film shot in 1938 demonstrates the use of a rototiller and caterpillar tractor on the farmland at Bron-y-de. A 1936 film filmed by Lloyd George's private secretary, A. J. Sylvester, shows Lloyd George in his orchard at Bron-y-de. A 1929 film shows Lloyd George at Bron-y-de reading accompanied by his Chow Chow dog, 'Y Chow Du' (The Black Chow).

In his memoirs, published in 1954, Tilden expressed the view that Bron-y-de would "become as world-known as many a city, and will no doubt some future day fall into the category of Hatfield, Hughenden or Hawarden". His hopes were not fulfilled; Bron-y-de was destroyed by fire in the 1960s.
