= 1912 Hythe by-election =

UK parliamentary by-election

The 1912 Hythe by-election was a Parliamentary by-election held on 11 June 1912. The constituency, in Kent, returned one Member of Parliament (MP) to the House of Commons of the United Kingdom, elected by the first past the post voting system. The by-election was occaisioned by the death of the sitting MP, Edward Sassoon

== Electoral history ==
Edward Sassoon was returned unopposed at the previous election. The previous election to that was contested and the result was as follows;

General election January 1910: Hythe electorate 6,541
| Party | Candidate | Votes | % | ±% |
|---|---|---|---|---|
| Conservative | Edward Sassoon | 3,746 | 65.7 | +7.7 |
| Liberal | W Clarke Hall | 1,954 | 34.3 | −7.7 |
| Majority | | 1,792 | 31.4 | +15.4 |
| Turnout | | 5,700 | 87.1 | +1.3 |
| Conservative hold | | Swing | +7.7 | |

General election December 1910: Hythe
| Party | Candidate | Votes | % | ±% |
|---|---|---|---|---|
| Conservative | Edward Sassoon | Unopposed | | |
| Conservative hold | | | | |

== Result ==
Philip Sassoon held the seat - for the Unionists, however compared with his father's January 1910 election result, the majority dropped slightly;

1912 Hythe by-election electorate 6,964
| Party | Candidate | Votes | % | ±% |
|---|---|---|---|---|
| Unionist | Philip Sassoon | 3,722 | 65.0 | −0.7 |
| Liberal | S Moorhouse | 2,004 | 35.0 | +0.7 |
| Majority | | 1,718 | 30.0 | −1.4 |
| Turnout | | 5,726 | 82.2 | −4.9 |
| Unionist hold | | Swing | -0.7 | |

== Aftermath ==
A General Election was due to take place by the end of 1915. By the autumn of 1914, the following candidates had been adopted to contest that election;

- Unionist: Philip Sassoon
- Liberal: William Deedes

Due to the outbreak of war, the election didn't take place until 1918;

General election 14 December 1918: Hythe electorate 19,896
| Party | Candidate | Votes | % | ±% |
|---|---|---|---|---|
| Unionist | *Philip Sassoon | 8,809 | 72.0 | N/A |
| Labour | Robert William Forsyth | 3,427 | 28.0 | New |
| Majority | | 5,382 | 44.0 | N/A |
| Turnout | | 12,236 | 61.6 | N/A |
| Unionist hold | | Swing | N/A | |

- Sassoon was the endorsed candidate of the Coalition Government.
