= Philip Tilden =

English architect

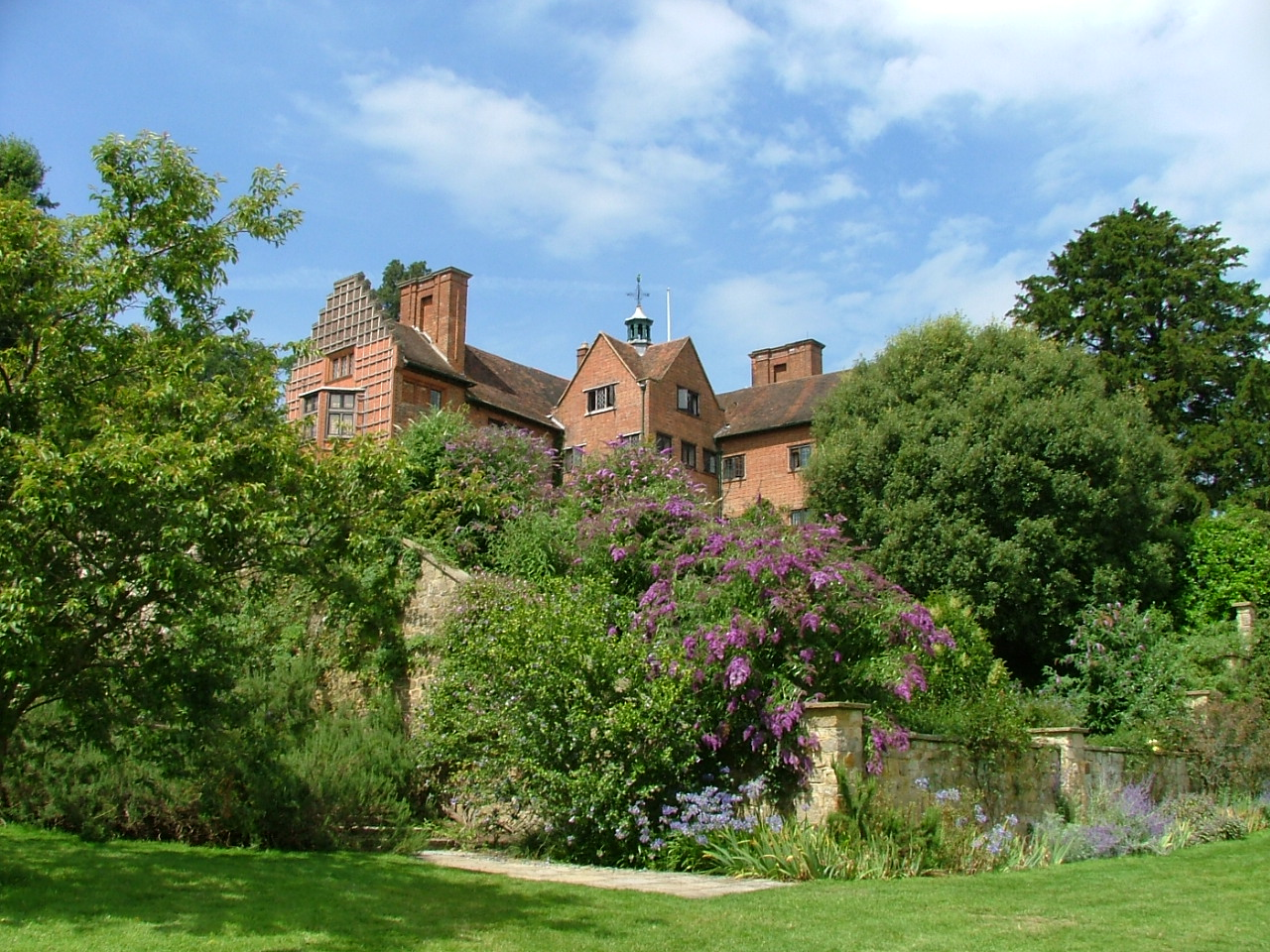
- Chartwell, Winston Churchill's country home, largely re-designed by Tilden
- Born: 31 May 1887
- Died: 25 February 1956 (aged 68)
- Occupation: Architect
- Buildings: Chartwell, Port Lympne Mansion, Bron-y-de, Churt

Philip Tilden (31 May 1887 – 25 February 1956) was an English architect, active in the early twentieth century, who worked for some of the most prominent members of English society, including Winston Churchill, David Lloyd George, Lord Beaverbrook, Sir Philip Sassoon, Lady Ottoline Morrell and Gordon Selfridge.

== Biography ==
Tilden was born on 31 May 1887, the son of William Augustus Tilden, a prominent chemist who discovered synthetic rubber. Educated at Bedales and Rugby, Tilden joined the Architectural Association in 1905, leaving in 1908 to become an articled pupil to Thomas Edward Collcutt, with whom he later went into partnership. By 1917, he had established his own practice and for the next twenty years worked almost exclusively for a small circle of rich, interconnected, patrons for whom he designed, or re-constructed, country houses, gardens, chapels and churches, castles and a vast tower that was intended to sit on top of Gordon Selfridge's department store on Oxford Street, London.

His best known works, apart from the unexecuted design for the Selfridges tower, were all for politicians: from 1918 to 1923 he designed the Moorish Courtyard, compared by Honor Channon to a "Spanish brothel", and the gardens and swimming pools at Port Lympne for Lloyd George's secretary, Philip Sassoon and may also have worked for Sassoon at Trent Park. Later in 1920s he completely reconstructed Chartwell for Winston Churchill and during the same period built Bron-y-de, at Churt in Surrey, as a country house for David Lloyd George. (Note: Tilden’s undoubted skills did not prevent him making practical mistakes, and falling out with many of his clients. Thomas Jones, visiting Bron-y-de in 1926 noted; “Tilden forgot to put a scullery at Churt: what he forgot at Chartwell I did not discover because he was a subject to be avoided.”)

By the late 1920s, Tilden's career had peaked: near bankruptcy, following some failed speculative developments; combined with a mental breakdown, which James Bettley, his biographer, attributes to Tilden's attempting to reconcile his homosexuality with his marriage to Amalia Broden, a Swedish author; led to his leaving London entirely and moving to Devon. The latter part of his career was spent mainly in the West Country, where he undertook the restoration of a number of, mostly, more important country houses for less socially eminent clients. Examples include the reconstruction of Antony House in Cornwall and of Sydenham House in Devon.

Many of Tilden's buildings now enjoy Listed Building status although this is sometimes due to the fame of their owners, or to work that pre-dated Tilden, rather than to his own efforts: examples include Port Lympne Mansion, Grade II* listed as at 29 December 1966; Chartwell, Grade I listed as at 16 January 1975, (Note: Historic England’s listing record for Chartwell makes clear that the house is designated for “historical reasons” rather than for architectural merit.) and Antony House, Grade I listed as at 21 July 1951.

In 1954 Tilden published his autobiography, True Remembrances: the memoirs of an architect. Bettley considered it highly unreliable. Philip Tilden died on 25 February 1956 at Shute, Devon. His obituary in The Times, described him as "an architect with a talent for restoring old buildings, though of a somewhat lush and luxurious taste."

== List of major works ==
- Allington Castle, Kent, 1917–33, reconstruction for Sir Martin Conway
- Antony House, Cornwall, 1945–47, alterations for Sir John Carew Pole
- Bron-y-de, Churt, Surrey, 1922–28, house for David Lloyd George, destroyed by fire in 1968
- Chartwell, Kent, 1923–24, alterations for Winston Churchill
- Cherkley Court, Leatherhead, Surrey, 1926, alterations for Lord Beaverbrook
- Garsington Manor, Oxfordshire, 1925–26, terrace and loggia for Lady Ottoline Morrell
- Clouds Hill, Offley, Hertfordshire, 1950, alterations for Lord Lloyd
- Long Crendon Manor, Buckinghamshire, 1918–1922, restoration for Laline Hohler
- Luscombe Castle, Devon, alterations for Sir Peter Hoare
- Luton Hoo, Hertfordshire, 1947, repairs after wartime use
- Port Lympne Mansion, Kent, 1918–23, alterations for Sir Philip Sassoon
- Prussia Cove, Cornwall, 1911–14, house for T.T. and Brian Behrens
- Saltwood Castle, Kent, 1930s, reconstruction for Sir Martin Conway
- Shrigley Hall, Cheshire, 1935–38, chapel for the Salesian Brothers

== Sources ==
- Aslet, Clive (1985). The Last Country Houses. Yale University Press. ISBN 0300034741.
- Bettley, James (1987). Lush and Luxurious: the life and work of Philip Tilden 1887–1956. Royal Institute of British Architects. OCLC 466189961.
- Tilden, Philip (1954). True Remembrances: The memoirs of an architect. London: Country Life. OCLC 636818090.
- Toye, Richard (2007). Lloyd George & Churchill: Rivals for Greatness. London: Macmillan Publishers. ISBN 978-1-405-04896-5. OCLC 1169990594.
