= 6th Parachute Division =

German WWII airborne division

- German: 6. Fallschirmjäger-Division
- Active: June 1944–May 1945
- Country: Germany
- Branch: Luftwaffe
- Type: Fallschirmjäger
- Size: Division

Commanders
- Notable commanders: Rüdiger von Heyking; Hermann Plocher

The 6th Parachute Division (German: 6. Fallschirmjäger-Division) was a Fallschirmjäger (airborne) division of the German military during the Second World War, active from 1944 to 1945.

The division was formed officially in France in June 1944, commanded by Rüdiger von Heyking. It contained several regiments:

- 16th (later transferred to Poland, May 1944),
- 17th,
- 18th Fallschirmjäger Regiments,
- and the 6th Fallschirmjäger Artillery Regiment.

Many members of the division would be the final cadre to receive parachute training.

The 16th Regiment was temporarily added later in the war, but was then transferred to the Eastern Front before the division saw combat, and would later be re-designated as 3rd Fallschirm-Grenadier-Regiment and assigned to Fallschirm-Panzergrenadier Division 2 Hermann Göring. The remainder of the division was sent into combat in Normandy in Kampfgruppe strength only. By July the 17th and 18th regiments had taken heavy losses in both men and materials. The surviving members were withdrawn to the Netherlands to rebuild, and saw combat there later in the year, particularly during Operation Pheasant. In early 1945, it fought in the Battle of the Reichswald, and surrendered to Allied forces in May.

== Commanding officers ==
- Generalleutnant Rüdiger von Heyking, 1 May 1944 – 3 September 1944
- Oberst Harry Herrmann, 3 September 1944 – 1 October 1944
- Generalleutnant Hermann Plocher, 1 October 1944 – 8 May 1945
