= Churt =

Village and parish in Surrey, England

Coordinates: 51°08′10″N 0°46′37″W

- Village and civil parish
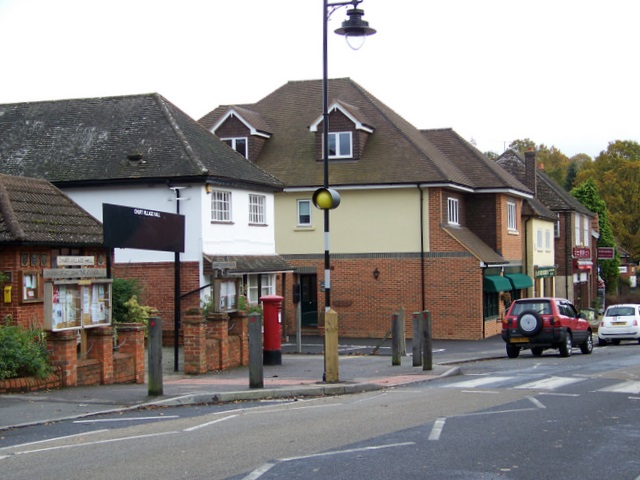
- The main street (A287) in Churt

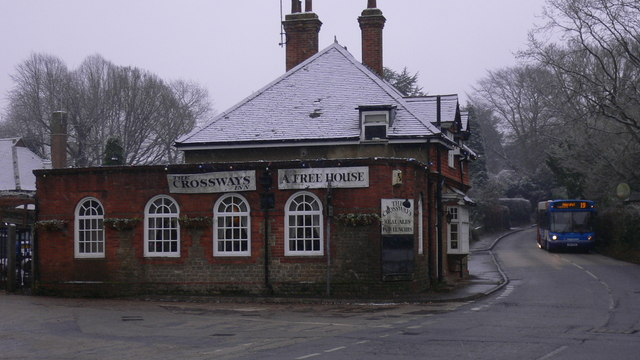
- The Crossways Inn in winter's snow

- Location within Surrey
- Area: 4.68 km^{2} (1.81 sq mi)
- Population: 1,202 (Civil Parish 2011)
  - Density: 257/km^{2} (670/sq mi)
- OS grid reference: SU8638
- Civil parish: Churt
- District: Waverley
- Shire county: Surrey
- Region: South East
- Country: England
- Sovereign state: United Kingdom
- Post town: Farnham
- Postcode district: GU10
- Dialling code: 01252 and 01428
- Police: Surrey
- Fire: Surrey
- Ambulance: South East Coast
- UK Parliament: Farnham and Bordon

Churt is a village and civil parish in the borough of Waverley in Surrey, England, about 5.5 miles (8.9 km) south of the town of Farnham on the A287 road towards Hindhead. A clustered settlement is set in areas acting as its green buffers, which include the Devil's Jumps. The west of the village slopes down to the steep edge of Whitmore Vale, which is mostly in Headley, Hampshire; at the foot of this bank is a steeply cut brook which defines the Hampshire border. There are forests and heathland by and atop the Greensand Ridge, and the hamlet of Crosswater is in the north of the parish.

== History ==
Churt's origins are Saxon. The village as Churt and Cherte is recorded in the 14th century as part of the "Great Sacks", and a tything of Farnham of the Bishop of Winchester; a subsidy roll assessed it at £3 9s ¼d (very roughly equivalent to £2,879 in 2025), presumably annually. Frensham Great Pond, dug to provide one such spiritual leader, Hædde, with fresh fish, is less than 10m beyond the north border.

Upon the establishment of the chapelry of Frensham in the 13th century, it became part of that entity short of a parish, which stretched as far south as Shottermill, a neighbourhood today of western Haslemere. Stating how the high common land was for tenants here of the lord of the manor, a court leet of 1540 ordered John Baker not to overburden it with his cattle ('beasts'). A case (in the national Court of the Exchequer) of 1692 asked whether Churt was in the Weald and whether wood cut from such land was tithe-free, and the juries answered both questions in the affirmative; the judges approved and refused a further appeal.

Almost opposite the parish church of St John, which was built shortly before the parish was created in 1865, is the old forge, built in about 1600 and now a Grade II listed building. A barn in the western fields next to the farmhouse of Green Cross Farm was built in the 16th century in Tudor style of wooden framing on a brick plinth, and is also Grade II listed. There are several other listed buildings in the village.

In 1892 George Cubitt, 1st Baron Ashcombe enlarged the chancel of the relatively young church.

== Geography ==
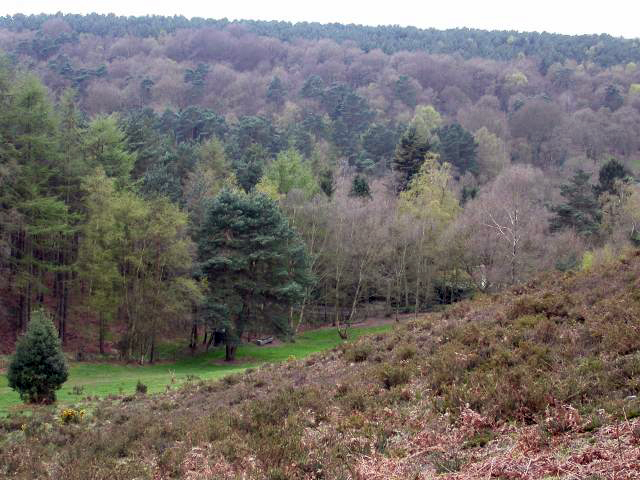
Coniferous woods in Whitmore Vale, Churt

The parish is roughly square and gradually slopes down to the northwest and steeply by the western border, where it is drained by a straight brook (feeding into the Wey) which demarcates the border with Hampshire. In the north are sudden hills, or knolls, three of which are described as 'curiously conical sandhills' in the Victoria County History (1911), and are recorded on maps as the Devil's Jumps.

The town of Farnham is centred 5.5 miles (8.9 km) north. The village sits in forests and heathland by and atop acidic sands of largely uneroded sandstone (the local form, Bargate stone) north of the escarpment of the Greensand Ridge.

== Notable residents ==
Industrialist Frank Mason spent the later part of his life in the area and provided the community with the village hall which remains the hub of the village.

The BBC's Blue Peter presenter John Noakes and his dog Shep lived in Churt, as did former professional golfer and golf commentator Peter Alliss. Kevin Keegan lived in Green Lane when playing for Southampton Football Club. Roger Black, Olympic athletics medallist, lives in the village.

David Lloyd George lived in Churt at his house Bron-y-de. His secretary and mistress, and later second wife, Frances Stevenson, also had a house there. The cricketing brothers Harry Walker and Thomas Walker were born in the village. The Police's drummer, Stewart Copeland, had a short spell in the village with his family. John Hunt, later Lord Hunt of Tanworth, Cabinet Secretary, lived in the village at Hale House until 1968 with his wife Magdalen. Charles Wylie, who lived in Crosswater Lane, was a member of the successful 1953 Mount Everest expedition.

The amateur astronomer Richard Carrington, whose 1859 astronomical observations first corroborated the existence of solar flares, moved to Churt in 1865. He founded a private observatory and lived there until his death in 1875.

Composer and pianist Eva Ruth Spalding (1883–1969) lived at Tyndrum, Pond Lane, Churt from the 1940s until her death in 1969.

== Culture ==
Since 1980, Churt has had an amateur dramatic society (CADS) which performs shows in the village hall.

== Sports clubs ==
Churt Recreation Ground is home to Churt Juniors Football Club, which caters for children in age groups from Under 5s to Under 11s. Children from Under 7s and above play matches in the North East Hampshire Youth League.

== Demography and housing ==
2011 Census Homes
Output area	Detached	Semi-detached	Terraced	Flats and apartments	Caravans/temporary/mobile homes	shared between households
(Civil Parish)	320	101	33	38	2	0

The average level of accommodation in the region composed of detached houses was 28%, the average that was apartments was 22.6%.

2011 Census Key Statistics
Output area	Population	Households	% Owned outright	% Owned with a loan	hectares
(Civil Parish)	1,202	494	41.5%	32.6%	468

The proportion of households in the civil parish who owned their home outright compares to the regional average of 35.1%. The proportion who owned their home with a loan compares to the regional average of 32.5%. The remaining % is made up of rented dwellings (plus a negligible % of households living rent-free).

== Local government ==
One of the 81 councillors of Surrey County Council is elected by and serves the area by sitting for Waverley Western Villages.

The relevant ward for the borough council is Frensham, Dockenfield and Tilford. Churt Parish Council meetings are open to the public.

== See also ==
- Baron Nathan of Churt, a title in the Peerage of the United Kingdom created in 1940
