= Sybil Cholmondeley, Marchioness of Cholmondeley =

British noblewoman and naval officer

The Most Honourable The Marchioness of Cholmondeley CBE
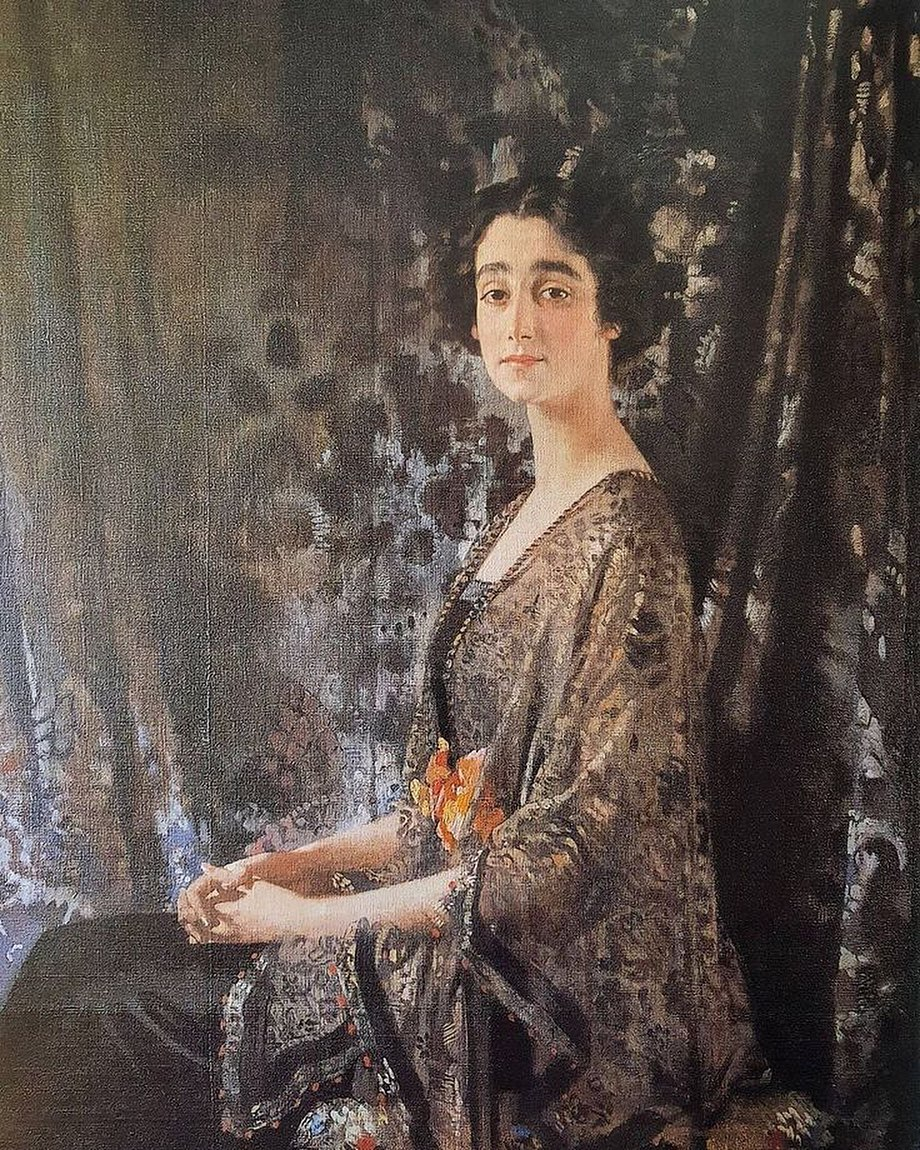
- Sybil Sassoon, Countess of Rocksavage, by William Orpen, 1916
- Born: Sybil Rachel Betty Cecile Sassoon; 30 January 1894; London, England
- Died: December 26, 1989 (aged 95); King's Lynn, Norfolk, England
- Noble family: Sassoon family
- Spouse: George Cholmondeley, 5th Marquess of Cholmondeley
- Issue: 3, including Hugh Cholmondeley, 6th Marquess of Cholmondeley
- Father: Edward Sassoon
- Mother: Aline Caroline de Rothschild

Sybil Rachel Betty Cecile Cholmondeley, Marchioness of Cholmondeley CBE (/ˈtʃʌmli/ CHUM-lee, born Sybil Rachel Betty Cecile Sassoon; 30 January 1894 – 26 December 1989), styled Countess of Rocksavage from 1913 to 1923, was a British socialite, patron of the arts, and Chief Staff Officer in the Women's Royal Naval Service (WRNS) during the Second World War. She belonged to the prominent Sassoon and Rothschild families.

== Family and life ==
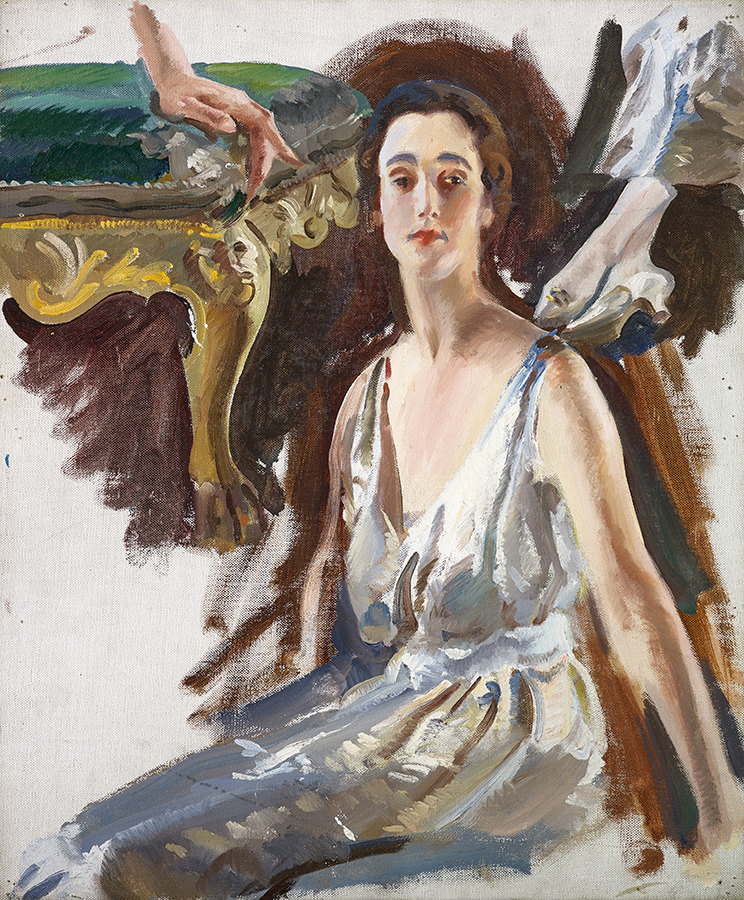
1922 portrait of Cholmondeley by Charles Sims; a preparatory work for the artist's The Countess of Rocksavage and her Son

Sybil Sassoon was born in London, to a Jewish family. She was the daughter of Sir Edward Sassoon (1856–1912), 2nd Bt., and Baroness Aline Caroline de Rothschild (1865–1909). Her brother was Sir Philip Sassoon.

On 6 August 1913, she married George Cholmondeley, Earl of Rocksavage (19 May 1883 – 16 September 1968). He later succeeded as the 5th Marquess of Cholmondeley. They had two sons and one daughter:

- Lady Aline Caroline Cholmondeley (5 October 1916 – 30 June 2015)
- George Hugh Cholmondeley, 6th Marquess of Cholmondeley (24 April 1919 – 13 March 1990)
- Lord John George Cholmondeley (15 November 1920 – October 1986)

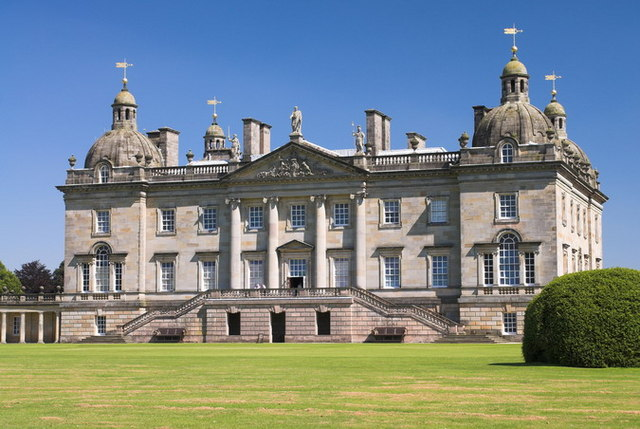
Houghton Hall

Lady Cholmondeley was largely responsible for restoring her husband's family estate, Houghton Hall, to its former glory. She was a generous patron of the arts and had an extensive art collection by the time of her death.

The Sybil Sassoon Gardens at Houghton were opened to the public in 1996. Lady Sybil's grandson, the current marquess, developed the gardens in honour of his grandmother. In 2008, the garden was named Historic Houses Association and Christie's Garden of the Year. In "the pool garden", the entwined initials "SS" are represented in the outlines of the clipped box-hedge which surrounds plantings of lavender and rosemary. She is buried in the Church of St Martin on the Houghton Hall estate. Through her son George Hugh Cholmondeley, Sybil is the great-grandmother of actor Jack Huston.

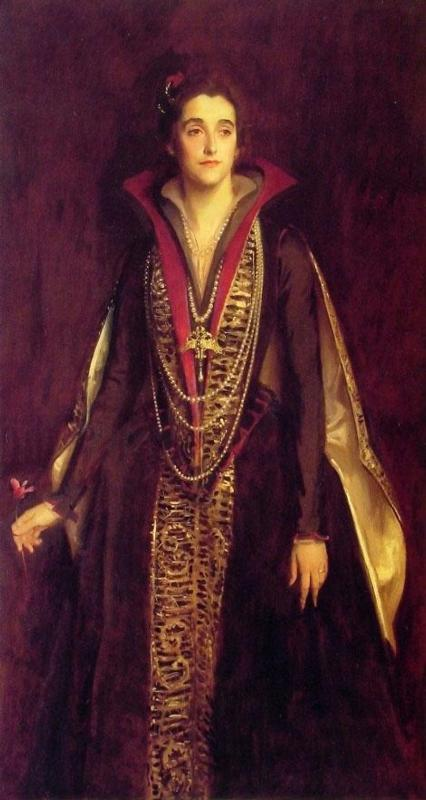
The Countess of Rocksavage wearing gown made by House of Worth 1922 by John Singer Sargent

She was Chief Staff Officer to Director WRNS from 12 November 1939 until 1946. On 9 February 1945 she was appointed as Superintendent of the Women's Royal Naval Service (WRNS) and the following year was made CBE.

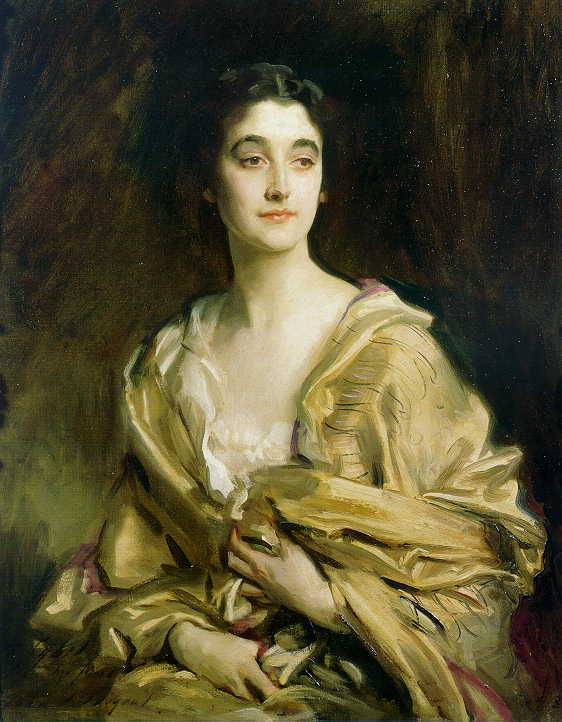
Sibyl Sassoon (later Marchioness of Cholmondeley) by John Singer Sargent

== Titles ==
She was identified by a number of changing titles during the several phases of her life:

- 1894–1913: Miss Sybil Sassoon
- 1913–1923: Countess of Rocksavage
- 1923–1946: The Most Honourable The Marchioness of Cholmondeley
- 1946–1968: The Most Honourable The Marchioness of Cholmondeley, CBE
- 1968–1989: The Most Honourable The Dowager Marchioness of Cholmondeley, CBE

== Honours ==
- 1939–1945 Superintendent in Women's Royal Naval Service
- 1939–1946 Chief Staff Officer in Women's Royal Naval Service
- 1946 Birthday Honours Commander of Order of the British Empire (CBE)

== See also ==
- Rothschild family
- Sassoon family
- Cholmondeley Award (poetry), established 1966
