= Trent Park =

English country house and grounds in north London

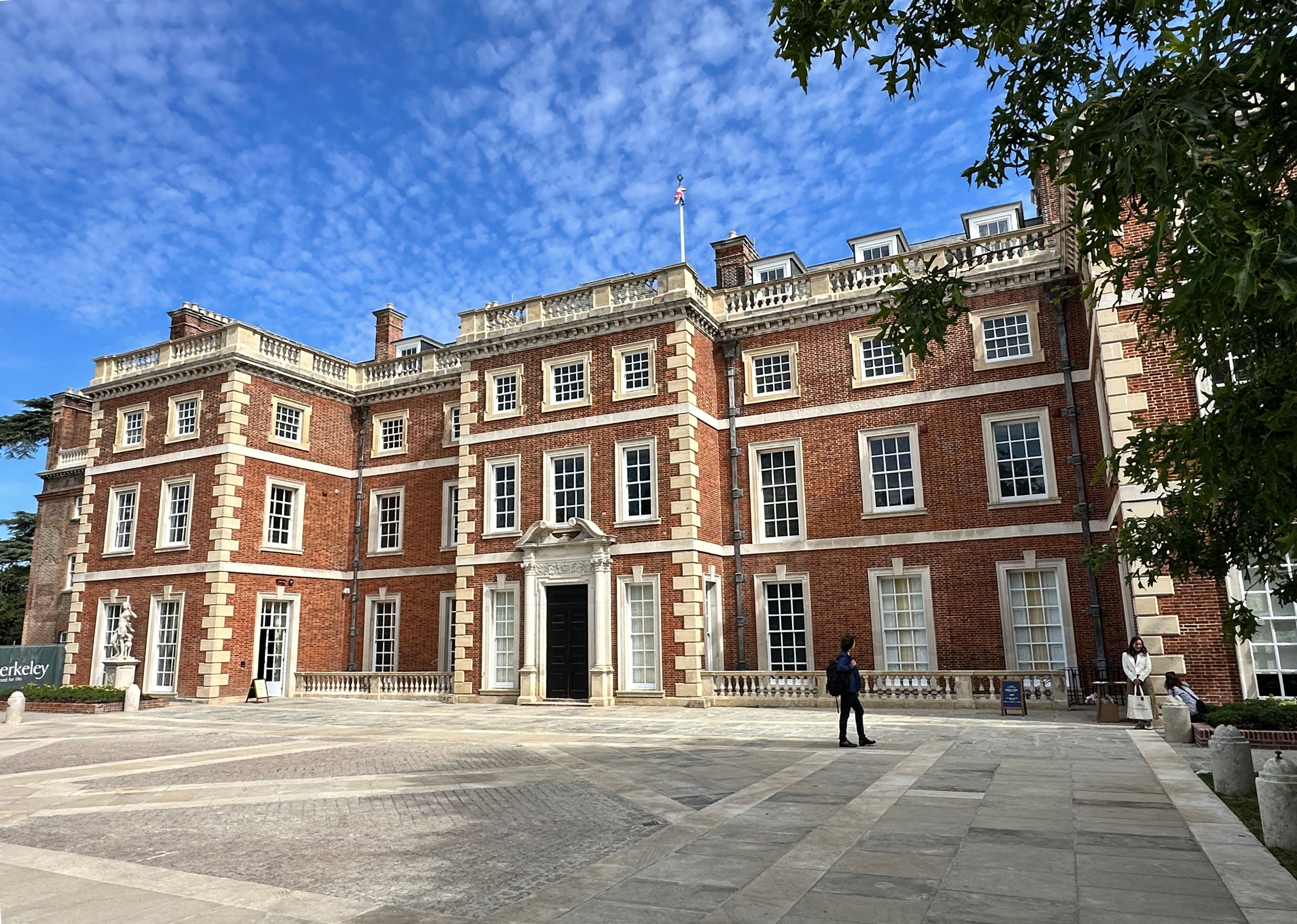
- The house in 2026
- Interactive map of Trent Park
- Type: English country house and country park
- Location: Cockfosters, London, UK
- Coordinates: 51°39′36″N 0°08′04″W
- Area: 320 hectares (3.2 km^{2})
- Created: 14th century (as parkland)
- Operator: London Borough of Enfield
- Status: Open all year
- Public transit: Oakwood and Cockfosters

Trent Park is an English country house in north London, accompanied by its former extensive grounds. The original great house, along with several statues and other structures within the grounds, such as the Orangery, are Grade II listed buildings. The site is designated as Metropolitan Green Belt, lies within a conservation area, and is also included at Grade II within the Register of Parks and Gardens of Special Historic Interest in England.

The house played an important role as a secret prisoner-of-war camp in the Second World War.

Until 2012, the house and adjacent buildings constituted the Trent Park campus of Middlesex University. The campus hosted the performing arts, teacher education, humanities, product design and engineering, television production, and biological science departments, as well as the Flood Hazard Research Centre. The campus was vacated in October 2012.

The parkland extends to approximately 320 hectares (3.2 km^{2}) and has been known as the Trent Country Park since 1973. The park includes a sports ground, Southgate Hockey Centre. Previously, there was an indoor tennis court that was attended by royalty. This later became a sports hall when the building was converted into a college of education.

The Trent Park site was purchased by a developer who received the necessary permits in October 2017 to construct 262 residential units. The site also includes a museum, the Trent Park House of Secrets, on the two lower floors of the mansion. While the university campus buildings were removed, the historic buildings, gardens and landscape were retained.

== History ==
Trent Park Visitor Album, opened on an ink sketch by Charlie Chaplin (October 1931).

Trent Park dates back to the fourteenth century when it was a part of Enfield Chase, one of Henry IV's hunting grounds. In 1777 George III leased the site to Sir Richard Jebb, his favourite doctor, as a reward for treating the King's younger brother, the then Duke of Gloucester. Jebb, or possibly George III, named the estate Trent, because the treatment took place in Trento. Jebb subsequently acquired the freehold interest in the house and on his death it was sold to Lord Cholmondeley.

In about 1836 the house was bought by the banker David Bevan for his son Robert Cooper Lee Bevan on his marriage to Lady Agneta Yorke. Robert Bevan built Christ Church, Cockfosters in 1838 to provide a suitable place of worship for the district.

The author and researcher Nesta Webster (nee Bevan) was born at Trent Park in 1876.

In 1909 the estate was sold to Sir Edward Sassoon, father of Philip Sassoon (cousin of the poet Siegfried Sassoon). Sir Philip Sassoon inherited the estate in 1912 upon his father's death and went on to entertain many notable guests at Trent Park, including Charlie Chaplin, who was photographed there. Winston Churchill painted a landscape depicting his wife, Clementine, walking along the terrace there in 1935.

== Trent Park House ==
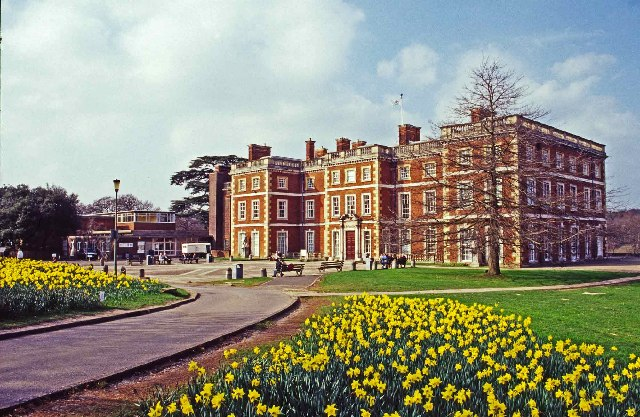
Trent Park House in 2005

Sir Philip Sassoon had a reputation for being one of the greatest hosts in Britain. Herbert Baker designed one house for him in 1912, Port Lympne, later the Port Lympne Wild Animal Park, in Kent, and Philip Tilden largely rebuilt another, Trent Park, from 1923.

Trent Park House - Improvements for Sir Philip Sassoon (orange - previously existing, red - new works).

Stylistic differences between the two houses illustrate changes in taste among members of British high society of the period. Trent Park possessed a landscape designed by Humphry Repton but the existing house was Victorian and undistinguished. Sassoon had the Victorian additions demolished or altered, except for the west service wing, between 1926 and 1931. The projecting wings were added to the entrance (south) front. These modifications led to a large mansion in early-Georgian style. It became one of the houses of the age:

a dream of another world – the white-coated footmen serving endless courses of rich but delicious food, the Duke of York coming in from golf... Winston Churchill arguing over the teacups with George Bernard Shaw, Lord Balfour dozing in an armchair, Rex Whistler absorbed in his painting... while Philip himself flitted from group to group, an alert, watchful, influential but unobtrusive stage director – all set against a background of mingled luxury, simplicity and informality, brilliantly contrived...

The atmosphere, as Clive Aslet has suggested, represented a complete about-face from Sassoon's earlier extravagance at Port Lympne to what Aslet called "an appreciation of English reserve." In the words of Christopher Hussey, at Trent, Sassoon caught "that indefinable and elusive quality, the spirit of a country house... an essence of cool, flowery, chintzy, elegant, unobtrusive rooms that rises in the mind when we are thinking of country houses."

Drawing Room at Trent Park House

Drawing Room at Trent Park House (detail)

Saloon at Trent Park House

Saloon at Trent Park House - wallpaper copied by Sassoon from an 18th century example in the Victoria and Albert Museum.

The Library at Trent Park House

The Library at Trent Park House (detail)

=== Second World War ===
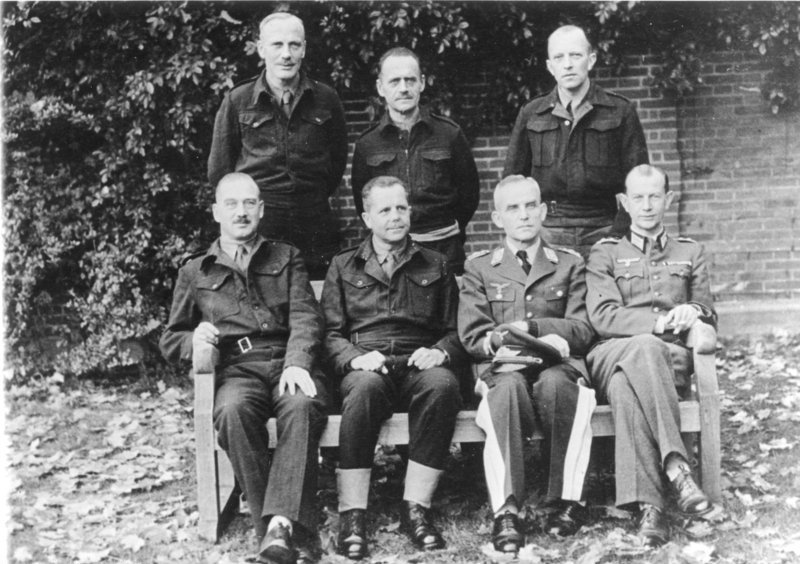
German officers at Trent Park. Back row from left to right: Generalleutnant Otto Elfeldt, Generalleutnant Ferdinand Heim, Generalmajor Gerhard Bassenge Front row from left to right: Generalleutnant Friedrich Freiherr von Broich, General der Panzertruppe Heinrich Eberbach, Generalleutnant Georg Neuffer, Oberst Hans Reimann

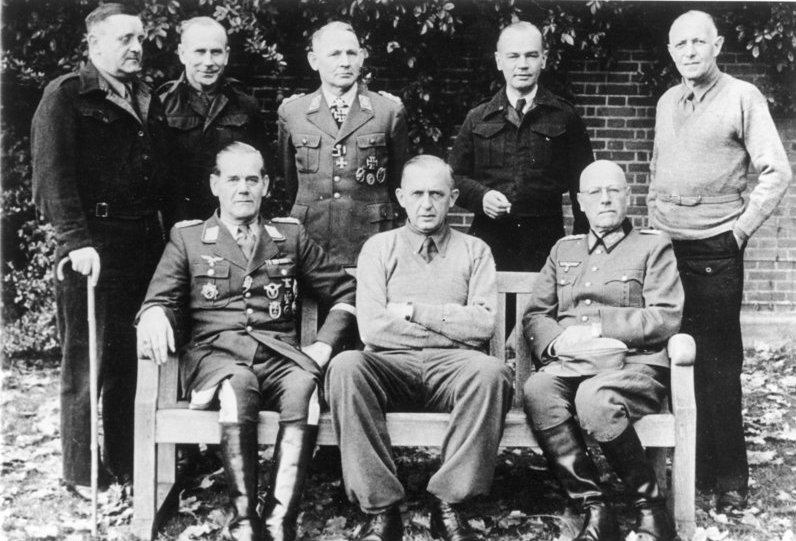
Another photo of German officers at Trent Park. Back row from left to right: General der Infanterie Dietrich von Choltitz, Oberst Gerhard Wilck, General der Fallschirmtruppe Hermann-Bernhard Ramcke, Generalmajor Knut Eberding, Oberst Eberhard Wildermuth Front row from left to right: Generalleutnant Rüdiger von Heyking, Generalleutnant Karl-Wilhelm von Schlieben, Generalleutnant Wilhelm Daser

Sir Philip Sassoon died in 1939 and the house was requisitioned by the government for use during World War II. Trent Park was one of three English country houses used as a centre to covertly extract information from captured German officers in a deception operation codenamed M-Rooms. During the Battle of Britain in 1940, captured Luftwaffe pilots were held initially at Trent Park. The rooms at Trent Park had been equipped with hidden microphones that allowed the British to listen in to the pilots' conversations. This provided information about the German pilots' views on a number of matters, including the relative strengths and weaknesses of German aircraft.

Later in the war it was used as a special prisoner-of-war camp (the 'Cockfosters Camp') for captured German generals and staff officers. They were treated hospitably, provided with special rations of whisky and allowed regular walks on the grounds. The hidden 88A pressure microphones and listening devices allowed the British military (MI19) to gather important information and an intimate insight into the minds of the German military elite. An example of the intelligence gained from Trent Park is the existence and location of the German rocket development at Peenemünde Army Research Center, when General Wilhelm Ritter von Thoma discussed what he had seen there. This led to the area being attacked by Bomber Command in Operation Hydra. Intelligence was also gained on war crimes, political views, and the resistance in Germany that led to the 20 July plot against Hitler. Eighty-four generals and a number of lower-ranking staff officers were brought to Trent Park.

More than 1,300 protocols were written by the time the war ended; a selection of these was published in English in 2007 under the title Tapping Hitler's Generals. Selected transcripts were dramatised in the 2008 History Channel 5-part series The Wehrmacht. In the episode The Crimes, General Dietrich von Choltitz is quoted as saying in October 1944:

We all share the guilt. We went along with everything, and we half-took the Nazis seriously, instead of saying 'to hell with you and your stupid nonsense'. I misled my soldiers into believing this rubbish. I feel utterly ashamed of myself. Perhaps we bear even more guilt than these uneducated animals. (This in apparent reference to Hitler and his supporting Nazi Party members.)

The transcripts from Trent Park are also included in the 2011 book Soldaten – On Fighting, Killing, and Dying: The Secret Second World War Tapes of German POWs by historian Sönke Neitzel and social psychologist Harald Welzer. In its review of the book, Der Spiegel reports:

Many Wehrmacht soldiers became witnesses to the Holocaust because they happened to be present or were invited to take part in a mass shooting. In one cell conversation, army General Edwin Graf von Rothkirch und Trach talks about his time in the Polish town of Kutno:

I knew an SS leader pretty well, and we talked about this and that, and one day he said: 'Listen, if you ever want to film one of these shootings? ... I mean, it doesn't really matter. These people are always shot in the morning. If you're interested, we still have a few left over, and we could also shoot them in the afternoon if you like.

It takes some sense of routine to be able to make such an offer. The fact that the people involved did not try to keep their activities a secret demonstrates how much the perpetrators took for granted the "mass shootings of Jews", as one of the POWs in Trent Park called it.

Wartime microphone cabling installed in 1939-40, identified in August 2019.

Wartime microphone cabling installed in 1939-40, identified in August 2019 (close-up).

Notebook belonging to General Crüwell - English phrases with their German translation.

Recording equipment displayed at Trent Park House of Secrets.

Scrambler telephone - Thomas Kendrick had one of these on his desk.

=== College conversion ===
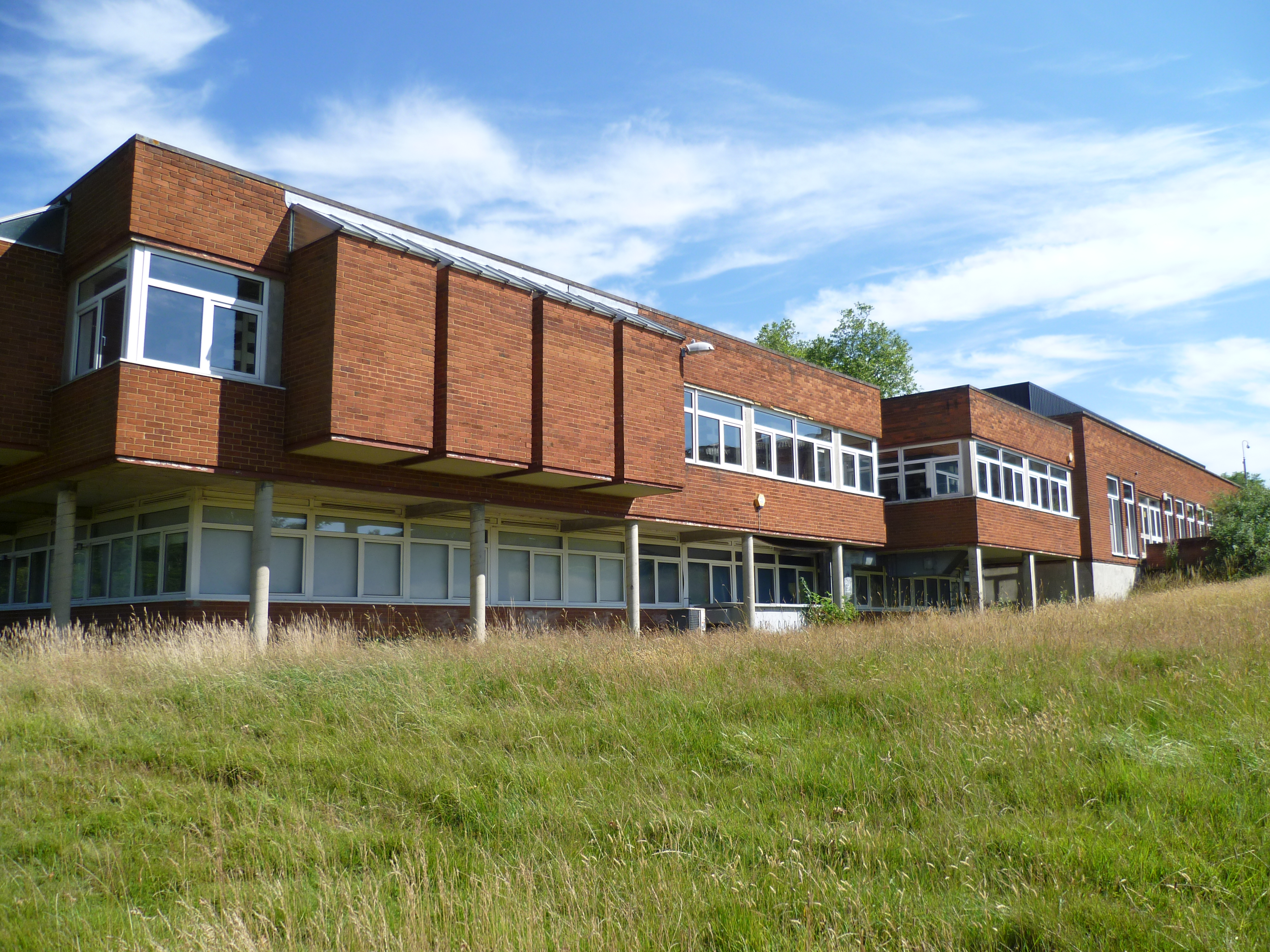
Former buildings of Middlesex University adjacent to Trent Park House.

In 1947 the estate became a Ministry of Education emergency training college for male teachers, then in 1950 it became Trent Park Training College, a constituent college of the University of London, Institute of Education a residential, co-educational training college. During the period as a college, famous alumni included Mike Figgis (film director), David Hepworth (writer and broadcaster) and Christopher Rogers (master brewer). In 1951 the entire estate was compulsorily purchased by Middlesex County Council as Green Belt land. In 1965 the Greater London Council took over the administration of the park and the London Borough of Enfield took over the college. Trent Country Park was opened to the public in 1973.

Trent Park Training College became part of Middlesex Polytechnic in 1974, which itself became Middlesex University in 1992.

In the mid-1990s, Middlesex University and Southgate Sports and Leisure Trust (SSLT) reached agreement to develop the dilapidated university sports ground. In 1997–8 SSLT built a clubhouse and two artificial grass pitches on the site, which was opened in March 1998 as Southgate Hockey Centre. It is home to Southgate Hockey Club, and provides sports and social facilities to the local community. Middlesex University vacated the Trent Park site in October 2012, and in 2013 it was bought by Malaysia's Allianze University College of Medical Sciences (AUCMS) for £30 million.

AUCMS went into liquidation in May 2014 and the liquidator sold the house and 50 acres of grounds to Berkeley Housing Group in September 2015. Campaigners wanted a museum opened in the house and lobbied to ensure that this would become part of the official plan; the Trent Park Museum Trust was successful in this effort.

=== Trent Park House of Secrets ===
A museum called Trent Park House of Secrets, was established on the ground floor and in the basement of the house. It records the history of the Second World War surveillance project. It opened in July 2026. The museum features a reconstruction of the grand ground floor salons with pieces of the original furniture and the cramped underground listening station in the basement.

Model of Trent Park House in 1943 when operating as Cockfosters Camp (model created by Ben Taggart).

Model of Trent Park House in 1943 when operating as Cockfosters Camp (close-up). Model created by Ben Taggart.

Model of Trent Park House in 1943 when operating as Cockfosters Camp (close-up). Model created by Ben Taggart.

One of the three M or 'Miked' rooms at Trent Park House where the listeners sat at machines listening through hidden microphones.

Captain Townshend's office at Trent Park House.

Interactive listening game at Trent Park House of Secrets.

Trent Park House of Secrets audio-visual exhibit.

'Selfie' Station at Trent Park House of Secrets

== Country Park ==
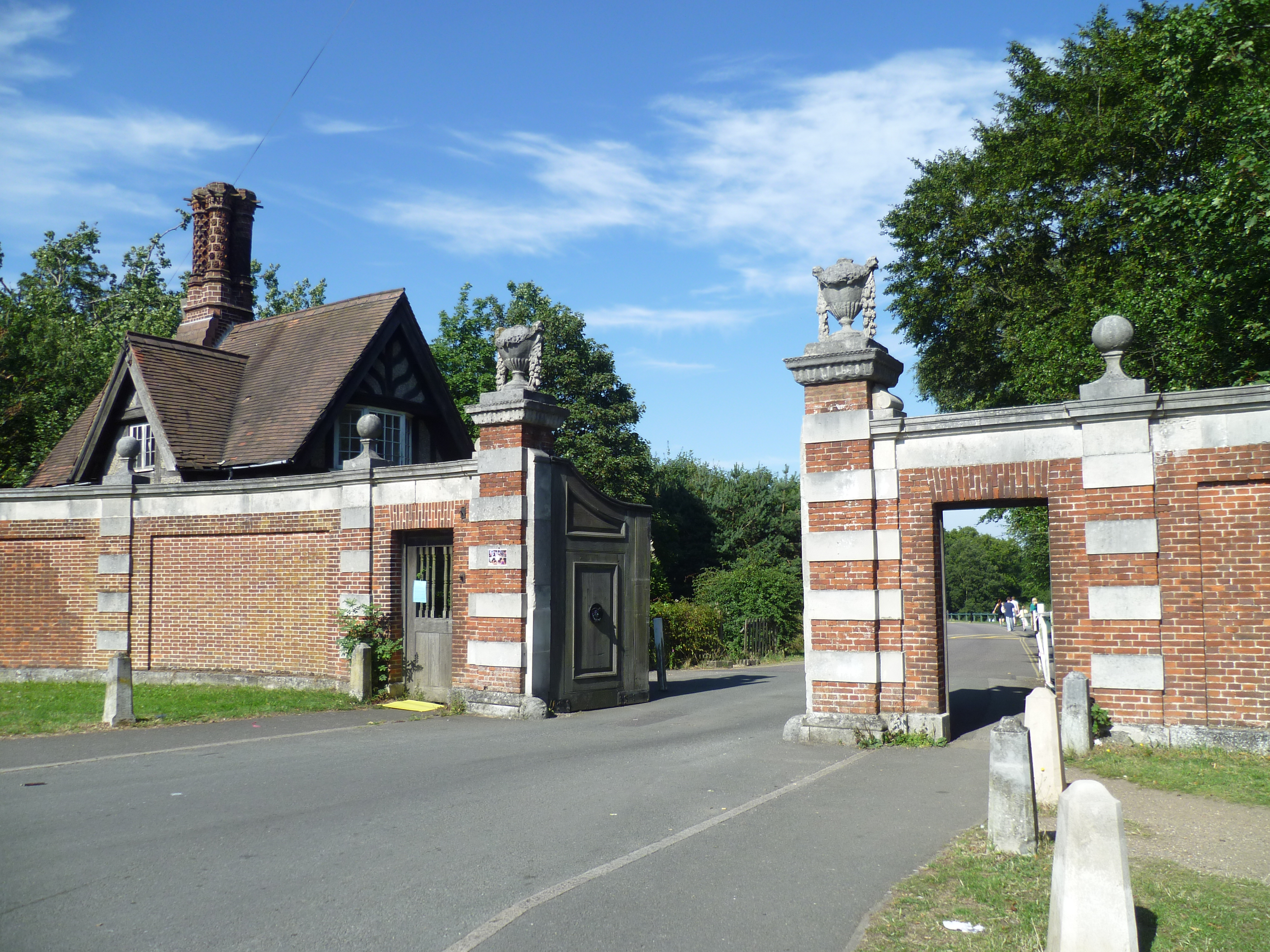
The main entrance to Trent Country Park.

In 1973 Trent Park was opened to the public as a country park, which at that time surrounded the university buildings and is 320 hectares in area.

For some years, country park included publicly accessible countryside, farmland, a golf course and an equestrian centre. Some of the grounds were attractively landscaped by Humphry Repton in the English manner.

Reports in summer 2019 indicated that Trent Country Park features included the cricket fields and the animal sanctuary (Wildlife Rescue Centre); the site included a Go Ape, a Country Club, a cafe in the main parking area and a children's playground with new equipment. The Waymark Trails were ready for use by mid-June. The Friends of Trent Park made a brochure with map available for free download.

== Camlet Moat ==
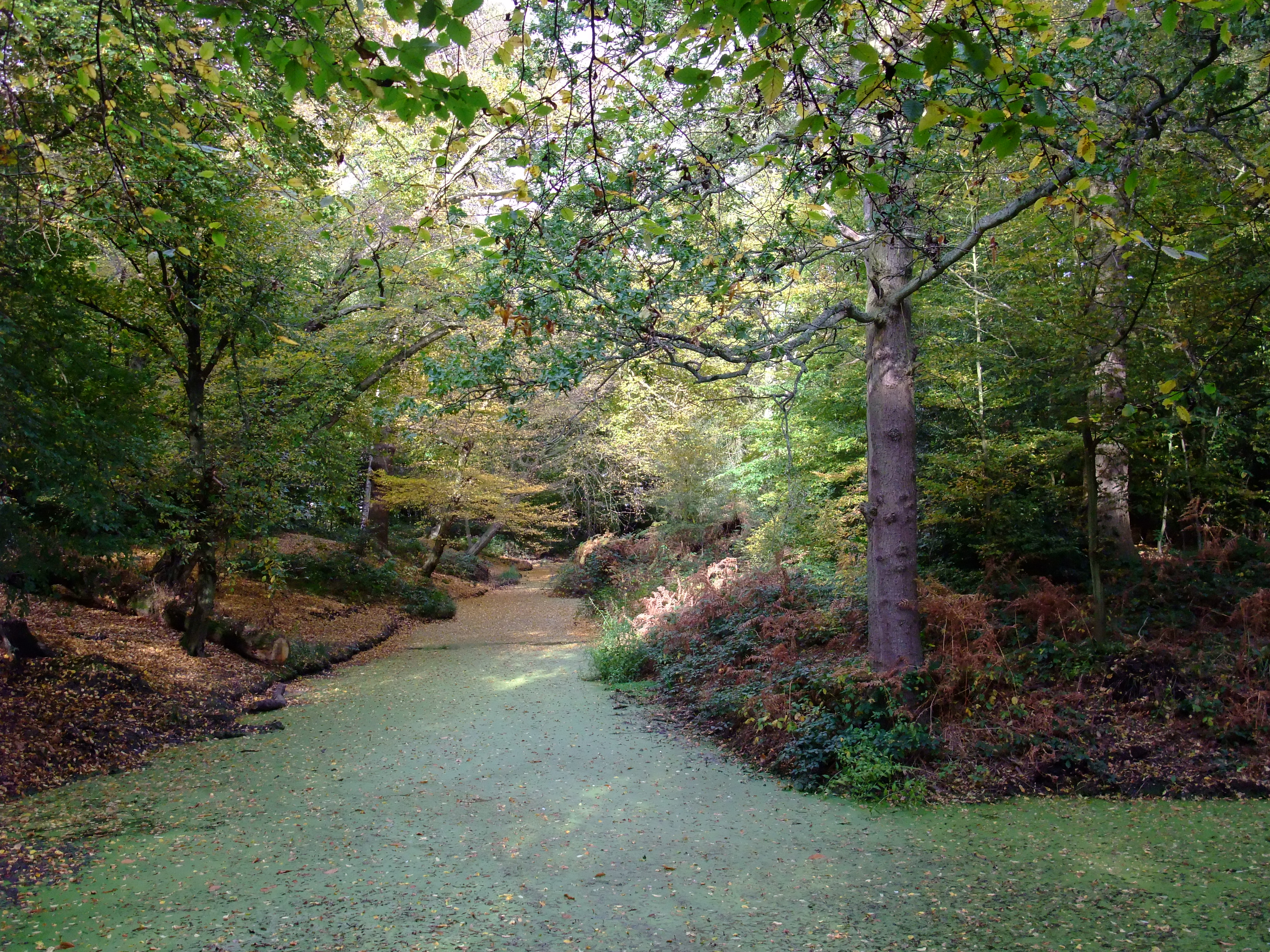
Camlet Moat

Within the country park, close to the Hadley Road entrance, is a small moated isle known as Camlet Moat. The name has been abbreviated over the years from "Camelot", and it first appeared in local records in 1440.

The moat is protected as a scheduled monument. A survey of the area conducted between 1956 and 1958 attributes the site as the seat of habitation of Geoffrey de Mandeville during the reign of William the Conqueror. A 2019 report states that the "earliest documented reference to this site comes from the 14th century. There is also a documented fact that in May 1439 instructions were given to demolish the 'Manor of Camelot', suggesting there was a building on the site". Another source indicates that a lodge was located on this site, and demolished in 1429 and the materials sold to help pay for repairs to Hertford Castle.

Sir Philip Sassoon conducted excavations in the 1920s and was reported to have found oak beams which formed the basis of a drawbridge, Roman shoes and daggers as well as mosaic tiles depicting a knight. The walls and foundations of a large stone building were also found. English Heritage refilled the excavations in 1999.

The Historic England site states that the moat area was said to be a haunt of Dick Turpin in the 1700s.

== In fiction ==
The exterior of the house was used as the location for scenes in the 1957 film The One That Got Away.

Trent Park was used as the location for scenes set in and around a boys' boarding school in the 1983 Doctor Who story, "Mawdryn Undead", featuring Peter Davison as the Fifth Doctor.

== See also ==
- Trent Park Cemetery
- Farm Hall, a similarly bugged facility where German scientists were detained after the war to glean evidence of the Nazi nuclear programme
- P. O. Box 1142 A similar U.S. facility for interrogating Nazi officers and scientists during World War II.

== Sources ==
- Audrey Nona Gamble, A History of the Bevan Family, London, 1924, ASIN: B00089UYZ4
