= Philip Sassoon =

British politician

The Right Honourable Sir Philip Sassoon Bt GBE CMG
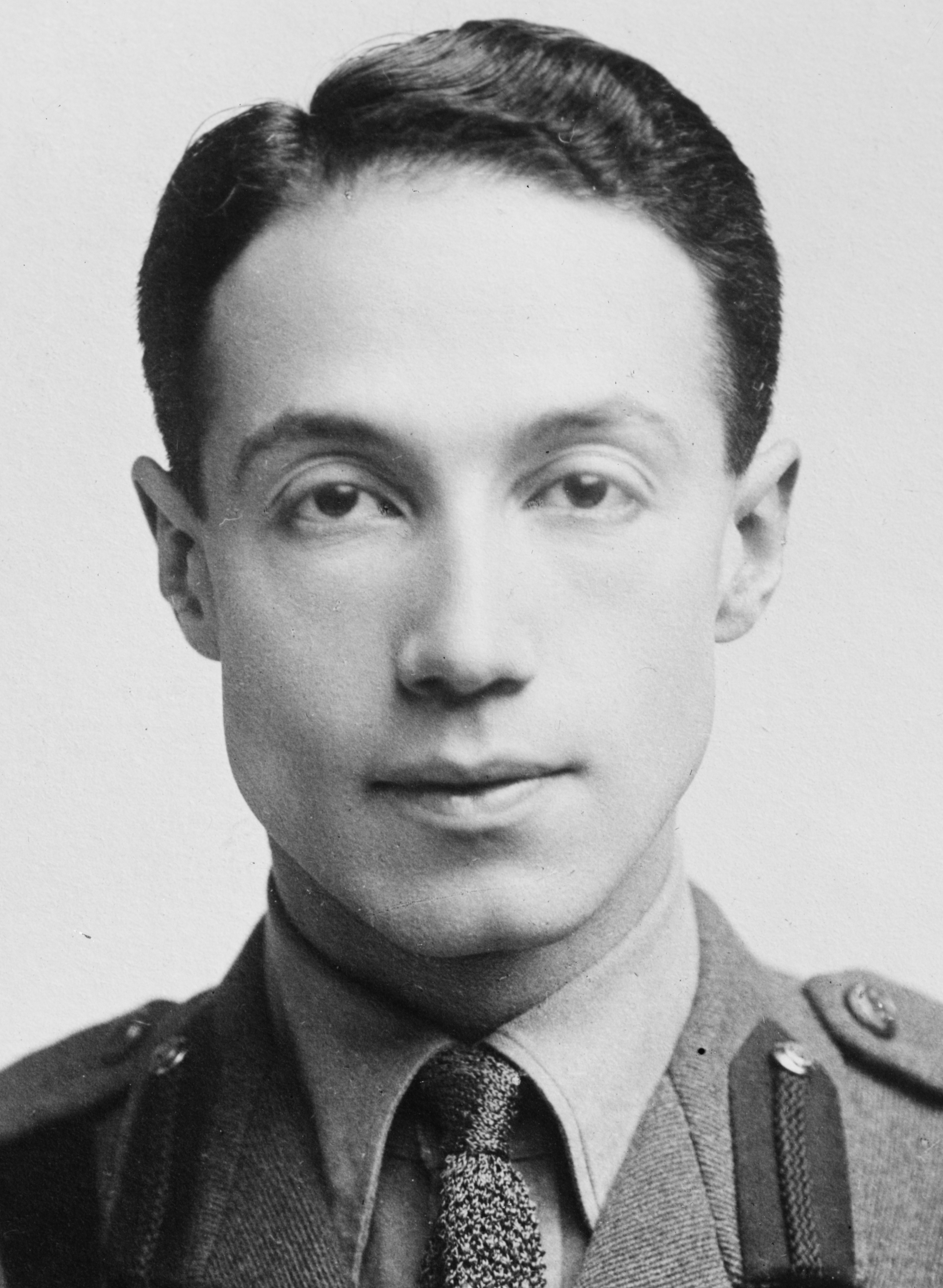
- Sir Philip Sassoon as a staff officer during the First World War

First Commissioner of Works
- In office 27 May 1937 – 3 June 1939
- Preceded by: The Earl Stanhope
- Succeeded by: Herwald Ramsbotham

Personal details
- Born: Philip Albert Gustave David Sassoon; 4 December 1888 Paris, France
- Died: 3 June 1939 (aged 50) London, England
- Parent(s): Edward Sassoon; Aline Caroline de Rothschild
- Education: Christ Church, Oxford
- Civilian awards: Knight Grand Cross of the Order of the British Empire

Military service
- Allegiance: United Kingdom
- Branch/service: British Army; Auxiliary Air Force
- Rank: Squadron Leader
- Commands: No. 601 (County of London) Squadron (1929–31)
- Battles/wars: First World War
- Military awards: Companion of the Order of St Michael and St George; Knight of the Legion of Honour (France); Officer of the Order of the Black Star (France); Croix de Guerre (France); Officer of the Order of the Crown (Belgium); Croix de Guerre (Belgium)

Sir Philip Albert Gustave David Sassoon, 3rd Baronet (4 December 1888 – 3 June 1939) was a British politician and aristocrat. He served as a staff officer during the First World War, from July 1914 to November 1918.

== Family ==
Sassoon was a member of the prominent Jewish Sassoon family and Rothschild family. He was born in his mother's mansion on Avenue de Marigny, Paris. His father was Sir Edward Albert Sassoon, 2nd Baronet, MP, son of Albert Abdullah David Sassoon; his mother was Aline Caroline, daughter of Gustave Samuel de Rothschild. His sister was Sybil Sassoon, who married the Marquess of Cholmondeley. He was a second cousin of the war poet Siegfried Sassoon. He was descended from the banking family of Frankfurt. When aged only nineteen years old his great-grandfather, James Rothschild was sent to Paris to set up the family business in France. James became wealthy. When he died in 1868 he was buried in Père Lachaise Cemetery. His branch of the Sassoon-Rothschild family kept the Jewish faith, donated to Jewish charities and founded synagogues.

His great-grandfather David Sassoon had been imprisoned in Baghdad in 1828, and in 1832 he established his business David Sassoon & Co. at Bombay. He took advantage of British rule to return to Baghdad to trade. The family eventually established a Head Office at 12, Leadenhall Street, London and a company branch in Manchester. The Sassoons became assimilated Jews, dressing, acting and thinking like Englishmen. The Sassoon brothers, David and Albert, were friends of the Prince of Wales, and built the 'Black Horse' brand. The business came with a baronetcy of Kensington Gore. His father bought Shorncliffe Lodge, in Sandgate Kent, where his cousin Mayer Rothschild was the MP. His father was not a successful backbencher, but the political influences had a profound effect on young Philip.

He was educated at Farnborough Prep school and Eton before going up to Oxford. At Eton, Sassoon made friends such as Denys Finch-Hatton. Old Etonian Arthur Balfour recommended the Debating Society to him. His father was also friendly with Frances Horner, wife of Sir John Horner, a longtime friend of Gladstone who lived at Mells Manor in Somerset. His house master was a member of the secret society of liberals, the Young Apostles. Also a near contemporary was Osbert Sitwell, the Yorkshireman and author. A French scholar, he learned the language doing classes at Windsor Castle. Sassoon was taught aesthetics by Henry Luxmoore giving an insight into philosophy and social realism. However he chose to read Modern History at Christ Church, Oxford. He was one of only 25 Jewish undergraduates, but was invited to join the Bullingdon Club. He joined the East Kent Yeomanry while still at Oxford and was commissioned as a second lieutenant.

Philip Sassoon entered Parliament in 1912. After the death of his relative David Gubbay (1865–1928), Sassoon became chairman of his family's company, David Sassoon & Co., although his participation in the management of it was only nominal. However, he continued to be a shareholder.

A 2016 biography, Charmed Life: The Phenomenal World of Philip Sassoon by Damian Collins, his successor as Member of Parliament for Hythe, provides a great deal of additional information about Sassoon. A summary by The Guardian includes this comment:

Sassoon enjoyed witty gossip, but was never spiteful. He spoke with a clipped sibilant lisp, and liked to relax in a blue silk smoking jacket with slippers of zebra hide. He had fickle, moody fascinations with young men with whom he soon grew bored, but was loyally appreciative of female friends and kept an inner court of elderly, cultivated, ironical bachelors. His sexuality was central to his character and activities, but there is never any hint of sexual activity in the many memories of him. One hates to think that he was as sublimated as he sounds. His restlessness and fatalism, which were notorious among his friends, killed him at the age of 50 in 1939: although his physicians ordered bed rest after a viral infection, he hurtled about in unnecessary gaieties until his body was beyond recovery.

== First World War ==
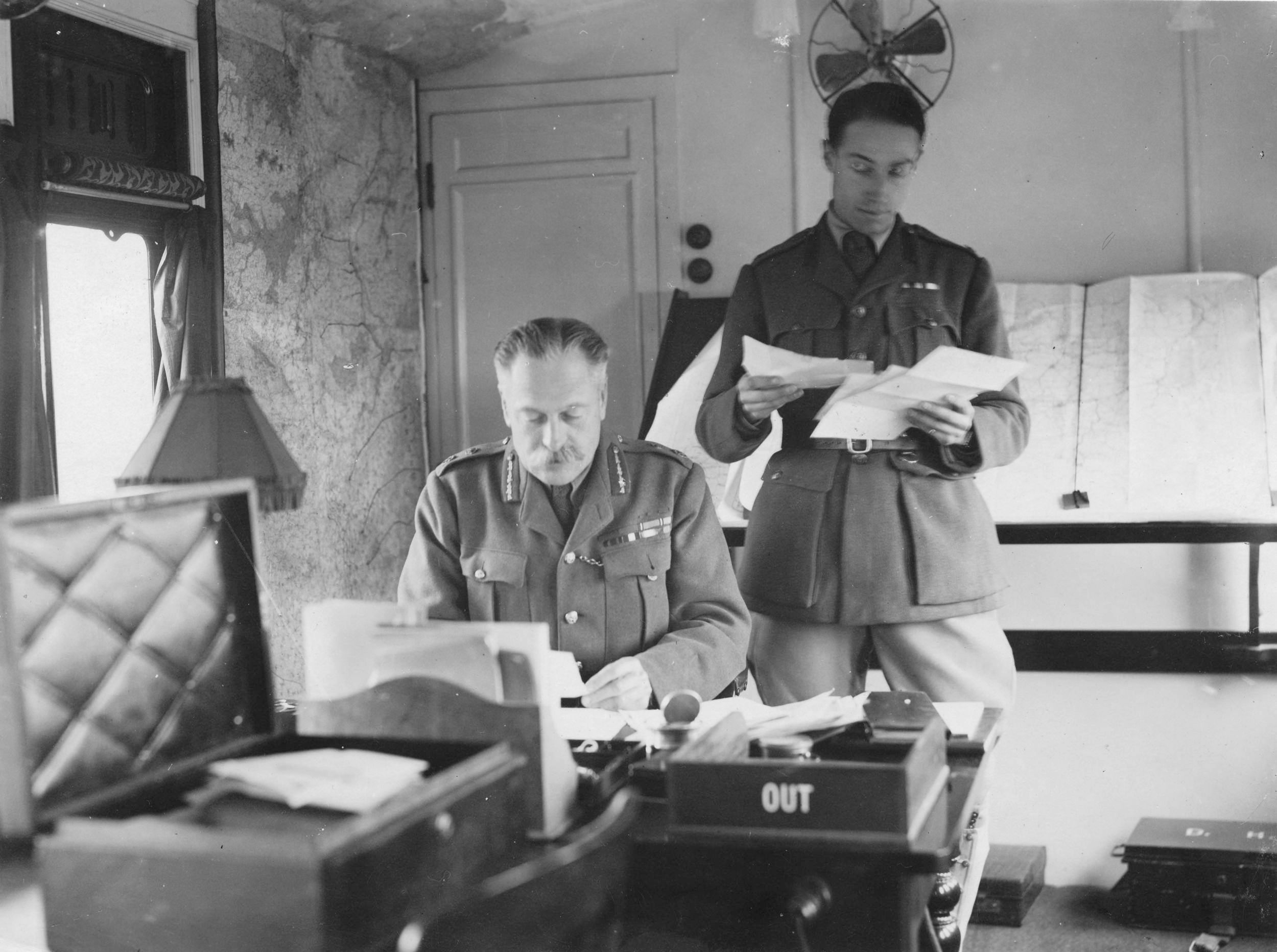
Field Marshal Sir Douglas Haig and Sir Philip Sassoon in Haig's office on a train, probably in France. It appears to have been taken on the same date as the photograph titled 'Haig in his office on a train', probably in the summer or autumn of 1918.

Sassoon served as private secretary to Field Marshal Sir Douglas Haig during the First World War from December 1915 to 1918. Sassoon was present at the meeting on 1 December 1914 at the Chateau Demont at Merville in France, when King George V and Edward Prince of Wales met with Raymond Poincaré, President of France, and the Generals Joseph Joffre, Ferdinand Foch and Sir Henry Rawlinson. The allies showed their determination to fight Germany and the Central Powers. Because of his "numerous social and political connections", Sassoon, at that time a second lieutenant in the Royal East Kent Yeomanry, was in attendance. A square bronze plaque commemorating the occasion was auctioned in 2012.

== Political career ==
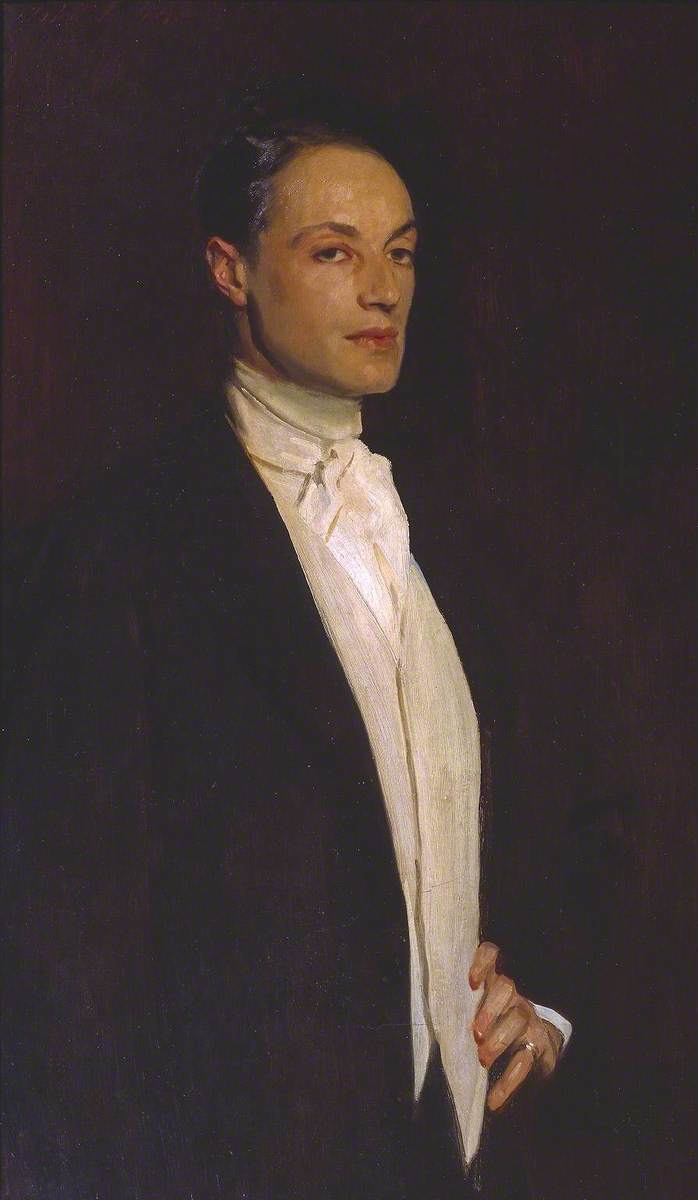
Sir Philip Sassoon, John Singer Sargent, 1923

He was Unionist Member of Parliament (MP) for Hythe from 1912, succeeding his father, initially as the "Baby of the House". As an MP, he advocated aviation and bought his own aeroplane in 1919. In his role as undersecretary in the air ministry, he promoted civilian air travel.

Sassoon was Parliamentary Private Secretary to David Lloyd George in 1920. Between 1924 and 1929 and again from 1931 until 1937 he served as Under-Secretary of State for Air, and gained much prominence in political circles. He was appointed a Privy Councillor in the 1929 Dissolution Honours. In 1937 he became First Commissioner of Works, a post which he held until his death, aged fifty, two years later.

He idolised the Prince of Wales, and supported the King during the abdication crisis of 1936. According to a review of the 2016 biography, "he wanted international peace at any cost, and convinced himself that Hitler's promises were dependable."

== Trent Park ==
He had a reputation for being one of the greatest hosts in Britain. Although he owned a house at Park Lane, Sassoon arranged for Herbert Baker to design another home for him in 1912, Port Lympne in Kent. (Decades later, it became the Port Lympne Wild Animal Park.) "It was a unique building, Italianate and Moorish in its influence, built for a voluptuary of the senses who wanted his rooms to be a rapturous medley of strong, exotic colours and filled with the luscious fragrance of flowers. The formal grounds at Port Lympne were like a Hollywood version of Tuscany," according to a summary of his 2016 biography.

He also owned Trent Park and hired Philip Tilden to largely rebuild that mansion located in Cockfosters. Stylistic differences between the two houses illustrate changes in taste among members of British high society of the period. Trent Park possessed a landscape designed by Humphrey Repton but the existing house was Victorian and undistinguished. Sassoon had the Victorian additions demolished or altered, except for the west service wing, between 1926 and 1931. The projecting wings were added to the entrance (south) front. These modifications led to a large mansion in early Georgian-style. It became one of the houses of the age according to one report, "a dream of another world – the white-coated footmen serving endless courses of rich but delicious food, the Duke of York coming in from golf... Winston Churchill arguing over the teacups with George Bernard Shaw, Lord Balfour dozing in an armchair, Rex Whistler absorbed in his painting... while Philip himself flitted from group to group, an alert, watchful, influential but unobtrusive stage director – all set against a background of mingled luxury, simplicity and informality, brilliantly contrived..."

This atmosphere, as Clive Aslet has suggested, represented a complete about-face from Sassoon's earlier extravagance at Port Lympne to what Aslet called "an appreciation of English reserve." In the words of Christopher Hussey, at Trent Sassoon caught "that indefinable and elusive quality, the spirit of a country house... an essence of cool, flowery, chintzy, elegant, unobtrusive rooms that rises in the mind when we are thinking of country houses."

Sassoon conducted excavations of Camlet Moat at Trent Park in the 1920s and was reported to have found oak beams which formed the basis of a drawbridge, Roman shoes and daggers as well as mosaic tiles depicting a knight mounted on a white horse. The foundations of a large stone building were also found. English Heritage refilled the excavations in 1999.

== Port Lympne Mansion ==
Neither the eye-popping interiors nor the extravagant gardens at Port Lympne Mansion could be described as in any way "reserved", or even "English". In fact, one reviewer of a 2016 bio about Sassoon described it as a "sybaritic mansion". Mark Girouard has written of the "quiet good taste expected of a country gentleman" against which Philip may have chafed in his younger years, apparently torn between the standards of Country Life and Metro-Goldwyn-Mayer. His Ballets Russes-inspired dining room at Port Lympne with its lapis walls, opalescent ceiling, gilt-winged chairs with jade-green cushions, all surmounted by a frieze of scantily-clad Africans, suggests the outsider confidence of a Rothschild and of an openly gay man.

"Philip Tilden added a bachelor's wing with Moorish courtyard, which Lady Honor Channon, (wife of Chips), unkindly likened to a Spanish brothel, to accommodate young airmen from nearby Romney Marsh flying field – among his other enthusiasms, Sir Philip was himself an aviator – and Tilden's twin swimming pools and monumentally classical garden staircase were in much the same theatrical spirit".

One frequent guest was T. E. Lawrence.

== Flying ==
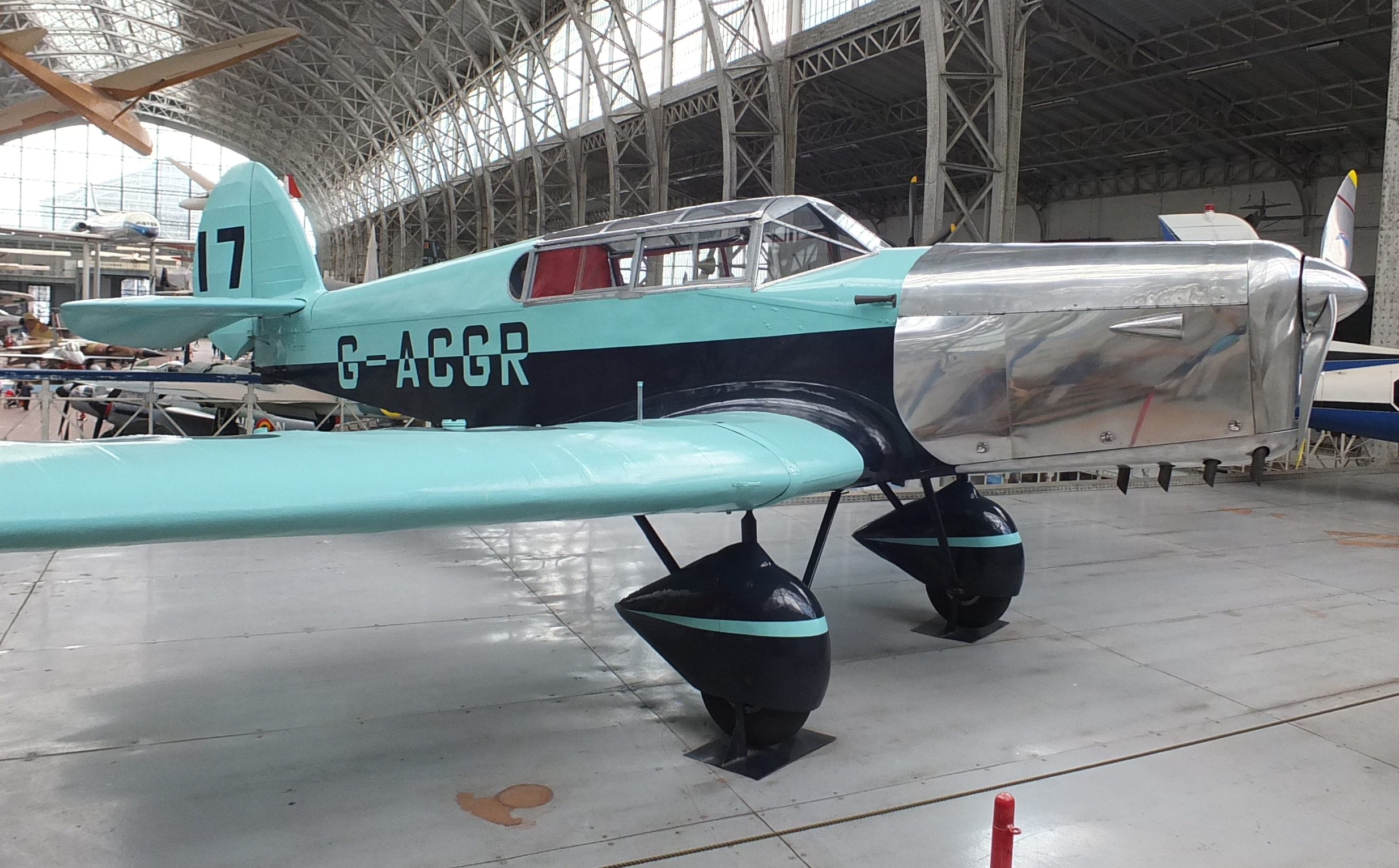
D.2 Gull Four (G-ACGR) displayed in the Brussels War Museum in prewar colours and racing number as it was flown by Sassoon in the 1933 King's Cup Race

As Secretary of State for Air, Sassoon was Honorary Air Commodore of No. 601 (County of London) Squadron. The squadron was nicknamed "The Millionaires’ Squadron" because it was reported to have six millionaire members. In 1932 he was enthusiastic about the new Percival Gull monoplane and ordered his own model powered by a Napier Javelin 111 six cylinder engine, with the interior finished in red leather. In this luxurious Gull Four G-ACGR (currently on display at the Brussels Military Museum) he competed in the King’s Cup and the Folkestone Aero Trophy Race. He later became the owner of the first Percival Petrel two-engine monoplane, completed in 1938. As Under-secretary of State for Air, Sassoon carried out the first general inspection of British overseas air stations, flying the Blackburn Iris. Afterwards he wrote The Third Route, published by Heinemann in 1929, recounting the story of the development of the air route from England to India.

== Honours and decorations ==
Sassoon was appointed a Companion of the Order of St Michael and St George (CMG) in 1917. On 7 October 1919, it was announced that Sassoon had been awarded the French Croix de Guerre "for distinguished services rendered during the course of the campaign". In 1923 he was made Knight Grand Cross of the Order of the British Empire (GBE).

In 2012 Sassoon's set of decorations was sold at auction. The decorations included the GBE, made by the court-jeweller Garrard, the CMG neck badge, also by Garrard, 1914–15 Star (engraved Lieut. Sir P.A.D.G.Sassoon. R.E.Kent Yeo.); British War Medal and Victory Medal (engraved Major Sir P.A.D.G.Sassoon. R.E.Kent Yeo.); 1935 Jubilee Medal and 1937 Coronation Medal (both engraved A/Cdre Sir Philip Sassoon 601 Squ. A.A.F.); France, a decoration of a Knight of the Legion d’Honneur, a decoration of a Knight of the French Colonial Order of the Black Star; Belgium, Officer of the Order of the Crown; French Croix de Guerre and Belgian Croix de Guerre; mounted in the court style.

== The arts ==
He was Chairman of the Trustees of the National Gallery from 1933 to 1935, and as Minister for Works in the 1930s he was responsible for embellishing many of London's monuments and parks. He was also a trustee of British School at Rome. As a collector Philip Sassoon was, like many of the Rothschilds, drawn mainly to the English and French 18th century, but he also collected contemporary artists such as John Singer Sargent and William Orpen. A Mamuluk glass mosque lamp, once belonging to Sassoon can be found in the collection of the Calouste Gulbenkian Museum in Lisbon, Portugal.

== Personal life ==
Sassoon was said to have lived a homosexual life. According to a reviewer of a 2016 biography of Sassoon, "his personal life was something that he shut away from the world". There was only a single intimate letter among his personal papers, to "Jack", a travel companion. The reviewer adds, "despite his many gay and bisexual friends, away from 'bohemian circles' it was still a taboo subject (homosexual acts were illegal). Sassoon was consequently regarded as an enigmatic solitary figure". Another reviewer offered that, "His sexuality was central to his character and activities, but there is never any hint of sexual activity in the many memories of him".

== Death ==
Sassoon died on 3 June 1939, aged 50, of complications from influenza. He left an estate valued at £1,980,892 (equivalent to £111,947,107 in 2025) on which death duty of close on £800,000 was paid. His cousin Hannah Gubbay (1885–1968), the widow of David Gubbay, was the main beneficiary, inheriting Port Lympne, Trent Park and an annuity of £11,000 (equivalent to £621,648 in 2025).

After Sassoon's death, he was described by his friend Noël Coward as "a phenomenon that would never recur". According to biographer Damian Collins "I think because he died just three months before the Second World War started, he became part of that lost golden era; war had closed a chapter on that".

Parliament of the United Kingdom
Preceded by Sir Edward Sassoon	Member of Parliament for Hythe; 1912–1939	Succeeded by Rupert Brabner
Political offices
Preceded by William Leach	Under-Secretary of State for Air; 1924–1929	Succeeded by Frederick Montague
Preceded by Frederick Montague	Under-Secretary of State for Air; 1931–1937	Succeeded by Anthony Muirhead
Preceded by The Earl Stanhope	First Commissioner of Works; 1937–1939	Succeeded by Herwald Ramsbotham
Baronetage of the United Kingdom
Preceded by Edward Sassoon	Baronet (of Kensington Gore); 1912–1939	Extinct
