= Edward Sassoon =

British politician

Sir Edward Sassoon Bt MP
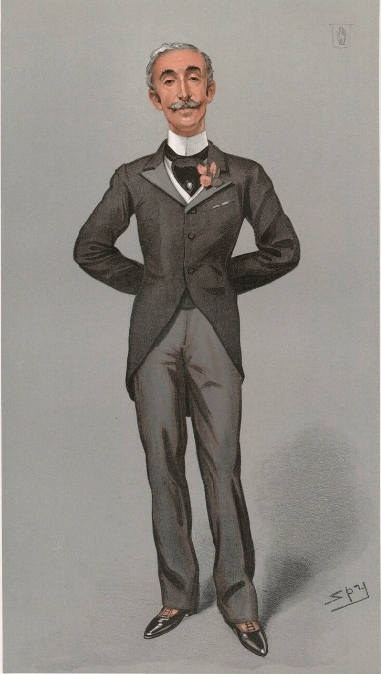
- "Hythe"; Sassoon as caricatured by Spy (Leslie Ward) in Vanity Fair, February 1900
- Born: Edward Albert Sassoon; 20 June 1856; Bombay, India
- Died: 24 May 1912 (aged 55); Brighton, England
- Spouse: Aline Caroline de Rothschild (m. 1887)
- Children: Philip Albert Gustave David (b. 1888); Sybil Rachel Bettie Cécile, Marchioness of Cholmondeley (b. 1894)
- Parent(s): Albert Sassoon; Hannah Moise

Sir Edward Albert Sassoon, 2nd Baronet (20 June 1856 – 24 May 1912) was a British businessman and politician.

== Early life ==
A member of the Sassoon family, he was born on 20 June 1856 in Bombay, India. He was the son of Hannah Moise and Albert Abdullah David Sassoon (1818–1896). He graduated from the University of London. He served as a major in the Middlesex Yeomanry (Duke of Cambridge's Hussars).

== Career ==
He was elected as the Liberal Unionist Party Member of Parliament (MP) for Hythe in March 1899. Active in Jewish community affairs, he served as a vice-president of Jews' College, London and the Anglo-Jewish Association.

He succeeded to the baronetcy in 1896 on the death of his father.

== Wireless telegraphy bill ==
On 13 July 1910, Sassoon proposed a bill in the House of Commons that would make installation of wireless telegraphy on passenger ships compulsory. Opposition to the bill was led by Thomas Gibson Bowles, who argued that the expense involved for shipping lines would make them less competitive and the bill failed. It would take the sinking of the Titanic two years later and the resulting 1914 International Convention for the Safety of Life at Sea to make Sassoon's proposal a reality.

== Personal life and death ==
In 1887, he married Aline Caroline de Rothschild (1867–1909), daughter of Baron Gustave de Rothschild and Cécile Anspach from Paris. They had two children:

- Philip Albert Gustave David (1888–1939).
- Sybil Rachel Bettie Cécile, Marchioness of Cholmondeley (1894–1989).

He died in 1912 at the age of fifty-five. His body was placed in a mausoleum in an Indian style, behind his house at Eastern Terrace, Brighton. The Sassoon Mausoleum had been built in 1876 by his father as a family resting place. However, there were no more burials after 1933, when it was emptied and sold, becoming first a furniture store, then a decorator's, next a restaurant and finally the ballroom of the Hanbury Arms public house. In 2006, the building was again sold to be converted to a private members' club.

His great-great-grandson is actor Jack Huston.

Parliament of the United Kingdom
Preceded by Sir James Bevan Edwards	Member of Parliament for Hythe; 1899–1912	Succeeded by Philip Sassoon
Baronetage of the United Kingdom
Preceded by Albert Abdullah David Sassoon	Baronet (of Kensington Gore, London); 1896–1912	Succeeded by Philip Sassoon
