= Aline Caroline de Rothschild =

French socialite

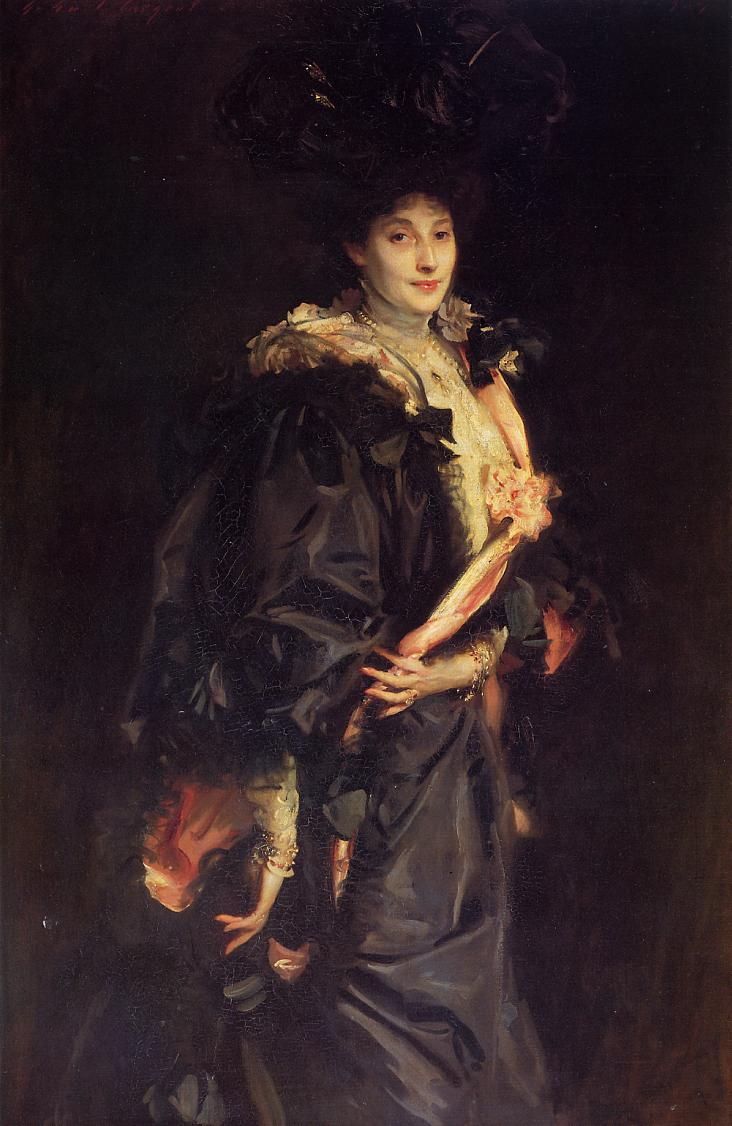
- Lady Sassoon, 1907 by John Singer Sargent
- Born: 21 October 1867; Paris, France
- Died: 28 July 1909 (aged 41); Paris, France
- Spouse: Edward Albert Sassoon (m. 1887)
- Children: Philip Albert Gustave David (b. 1888); Sybil Rachel Bettie Cécile, Marchioness of Cholmondeley (b. 1894)
- Parent(s): Gustave de Rothschild; Cécile Anspach

Aline Caroline de Rothschild, Lady Sassoon (21 October 1867 – 28 July 1909) was a French socialite and daughter of Cécile Anspach and Baron Gustave de Rothschild of the Rothschild family.

She was born in Paris, where her parents had a house on Avenue Marigny. In 1887, aged 19, she married Edward Sassoon (later Sir Edward Sassoon, 2nd Bt.). They had two children:

- Sir Philip Albert Gustave David Sassoon, 3rd Bt. (1888–1939)
- Sybil Rachel Bettie Cécile, Marchioness of Cholmondeley (1894–1989)

The family settled in London at 25, Kensington Gore, where de Rothschild, a talented artist, set up her own studio. She was part of a group of 'personages distinguished for their breeding, beauty, delicacy and discrimination of mind' called 'The Souls'.

De Rothschild died in Paris on 28 July 1909. Her great-great-grandson is actor Jack Huston.

== See also ==
- Rothschild banking family of France
