= Frank Ongley Darvall =

British students' union leader, Liberal politician and diplomat

Frank Ongley Darvall CBE
- Born: 16 April 1906; Reading, Berkshire
- Died: 21 May 1987 (aged 81)
- Education: Dover College; University of Reading; University of London; Columbia University
- Occupations: Politician; Diplomat
- Political party: Liberal Party
- Spouse: Dorothy Edmonds (m. 1931)
- Children: 1
- Relatives: Lawrence Darvall (brother); Margaret Darvall (sister)

President of the National Union of Students
- In office 1927-1929
- Preceded by: J E Meredith
- Succeeded by: Sam Cohen

Frank Ongley Darvall CBE (16 April 1906 – 21 May 1987), was a British students' union leader, Liberal Party politician, diplomat and authority on Anglo-American relations.

== Background ==
He was the fifth son of Richard Thomas Darvall and Annie Johnson, of Reading, Berkshire. One of his elder brothers was Air Marshall Sir Lawrence Darvall (1898–1968), another was Alan Francis Darvall (1903–1983) who was headmaster of Wells House School in Malvern, Worcestershire from 1933 to 1968, Margaret Darvall was his sister.

He was educated at Dover College and Reading (BA), London (BA, PhD) and Columbia (MA) Universities. He was awarded the CBE in 1954.

== Political career ==
He was President of the National Union of Students from 1927 to 1929.

He was Liberal candidate for the Ipswich Division of Suffolk at the 1929 general election.

General election 1929: Ipswich Electorate 54,474
| Party | Candidate | Votes | % | ±% |
|---|---|---|---|---|
| Unionist | Sir Francis John Childs Ganzoni | 18,527 | 39.7 | −15.7 |
| Labour | Robert Jackson | 17,592 | 37.7 | −6.9 |
| Liberal | Frank Ongley Darvall | 10,559 | 22.6 | n/a |
| Majority | | | | |
| Turnout | | | 85.7 | −2.0 |
| Unionist hold | | Swing | −4.4 | |

He was Liberal candidate for the King's Lynn Division of Norfolk at the 1935 general election.

General election 1935 Electorate 48,764
| Party | Candidate | Votes | % | ±% |
|---|---|---|---|---|
| Conservative | Somerset Maxwell | 17,492 | 50.0 | |
| Labour | F. Emerson | 12,062 | 34.5 | |
| Liberal | Frank Ongley Darvall | 5,418 | 15.5 | |
| Majority | | 5,430 | 15.5 | |
| Turnout | | 34,972 | 71.7 | |
| Conservative hold | | Swing | | |

After the election he was adopted by Dorset East Liberal Association as their prospective parliamentary candidate, a more winnable seat as the Liberals came second in 1935 and had last won as recently as 1929.

Darvall was prominent touring around Britain giving a series of lectures on world affairs in conjunction with the University Extension Association. Darvall was elected to the influential policy-making body the Liberal Party Council. From this platform he was one of the leading figures in the party who argued in support of a Popular Front which was also argued for inside the Labour party by the likes of Sir Stafford Cripps. A Popular Front government would most likely come to power as a result of electoral co-operation between the Liberal and Labour parties. A general election was expected to take place sometime in 1939. In February 1939, while Cripps was being threatened by the Labour party with expulsion, Darvall was told by friends in the Labour party that the rejection of Cripps' Popular Front strategy did not mean that locally agreed electoral co-operation could not go ahead. Darvall advised Liberal HQ to refrain from publicly backing Cripps as this could help secure more local electoral pacts. Although Labour had already selected a prospective parliamentary candidate for Dorset East, it was indicated that they would be prepared to withdraw him and support Darvall in a general election. However, in July 1939 Darvall was approached and agreed to stand as the Liberal candidate for the 1939 Hythe by-election in Kent. The Liberals were also the main challengers to the Conservatives in Hythe and Darvall had received an assurance that Labour would not oppose him in Hythe. Although Darvall achieved a swing to the Liberals of 8.4%, the Conservatives held the seat.

Hythe by-election, 1939 Electorate 35,535
| Party | Candidate | Votes | % | ±% |
|---|---|---|---|---|
| Conservative | Rupert Arnold Brabner | 12,016 | 54.2 | −9.7 |
| Liberal | Frank Ongley Darvall | 9,577 | 43.2 | +7.1 |
| Independent | Harry St. John Bridger Philby | 576 | 2.6 | n/a |
| Majority | | 2,439 | 11.0 | −16.8 |
| Turnout | | | 62.4 | −5.9 |
| Conservative hold | | Swing | −8.4 | |

With a general election perhaps only a couple of months away, Darvall agreed to remain as Liberal candidate for Hythe and the Dorset East Liberals quickly found a replacement for him in Graham Hutton. As things transpired, the anticipated general election was not held due to the outbreak of war.

== Early career ==
He was Commonwealth Fund Fellow, 1929–31; Assoc. Sec. for International Studies, International Students Service, 1931–32; Dir, Geneva Students International Union, 1933. Extension Lecturer and Tutorial Classes Tutor, Cambridge and London Universities, 1933–39. Lecturer in Economics and History, Queen's College, Harley Street, 1933–36; Director Research and Discussion, English Speaking Union, 1936–39; Deputy Director American Div., Ministry of Information, 1939–45.

== Diplomatic career ==
He was British consul, Denver, 1945–46; 1st Secretary HM Embassy, Washington, 1946–49; vice-chairman Kinsman Trust, 1949–56; editor, The English-Speaking World, 1950–53; director-general, English-speaking Union of the Commonwealth, 1949–57; chairman, Congress of European-American Assoc., 1954–57. European editor, World Review, 1958–59. Honorary director UK Committee, Atlantic Congress, 1959; attached British High Commission, Cyprus, 1960–62; director, British Information Services, Eastern Caribbean, 1962–66; attached, British consulate-general, Barcelona, 1966; consul, Boston, 1966–68; FCO (formerly CO), 1968–70. He retired from HM Diplomatic Service in 1970.

He was dean of academics, Alvescot College, 1970–71, vice-president, 1971–72.

== Publications ==
He wrote extensively throughout his career, but his three most significant works were;

- Popular Disturbances and Public Order in Regency England, 1934
- The Price of European Peace, 1937
- The American Political Scene, 1939

== Personal life ==
In 1931, Darvall married Dorothy Edmonds, a native of New York City. Their wedding reception was held at the International House of New York, which was co-founded by the bride's father, Harry Edmonds. The wedding was attended by many members of New York high society, including John D. Rockefeller III (who was one of the groomsmen), John D. Rockefeller Jr., William Church Osborn, Frederick Osborn, Frank Lusk Babbott, among others.

Darvall and his wife had one son.
