= Harold Hoskins =

Harold Hoskins may refer to:

- Harold K. Hoskins (1927–2012), American pilot and Tuskegee Airman
- Harold B. Hoskins (1895–1977, American businessman, diplomat and expert on the Middle East
- Gator Hoskins (Harold Hoskins, born 1991), American football tight end
