= St John Philby =

British Arabist (1885–1960)

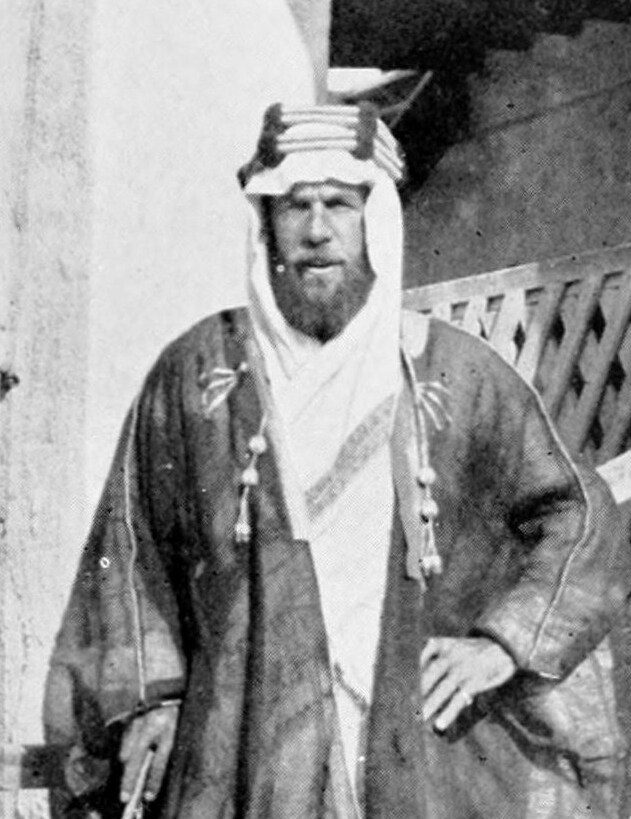
- St John Philby in Riyadh
- Born: Harry St John Bridger Philby; 3 April 1885; Badulla, British Ceylon
- Died: 30 September 1960 (aged 75); Beirut, Lebanon
- Education: Trinity College, Cambridge
- Occupations: Arabist, explorer, writer, intelligence officer
- Spouses: Dora Johnston (m. 1910) Rozy al-Abdul Aziz (m. 1945)
- Children: with Dora: Kim; Diana; Helena; Patricia; with Rozy: Fahad; Sultan; Faris; Khaled

Harry St John Bridger Philby, CIE (3 April 1885 – 30 September 1960), also known as Jack Philby or Sheikh Abdullah (Arabic: الشيخ عبدالله), was a British Arabist, adviser, explorer, writer, and a colonial intelligence officer who served as an adviser to King Abdulaziz ibn Saud, the founder of Saudi Arabia.

As he states in his autobiography, he "became something of a fanatic" and in 1908 "the first Socialist to join the Indian Civil Service". After studying Oriental languages at the University of Cambridge, he was posted to Lahore in the Punjab in 1908, acquiring fluency in Urdu, Punjabi, Baluchi, Persian and eventually Arabic. He converted to Islam in 1930 and later became an adviser to Ibn Saud, urging him to unite the Arabian Peninsula under Saudi rule, and helping him to negotiate with the United Kingdom and the United States when petroleum was discovered in 1938.

== Early life ==
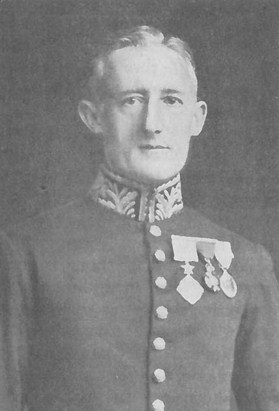
The British Colonial Office administrator in the Middle East Percy Cox in 1916 – he signed the Darin Pact on behalf of the British Government, on the island of Tarut in 1915 with Abdul Aziz, the then Sultan of Nejd and future King of Saudi Arabia

"'Abdul 'Aziz ibn 'Abdul Rahman ibn Faisal ibn Saud, the ruler of Wahabiland, on right, with his cousin Salman al 'Arafa" – Photo c. 1918 and caption from Philby's two-volume 1922 book The Heart of Arabia

Born in Badulla in British Ceylon (now Sri Lanka), the son of a tea planter, Philby was educated at Westminster School and Trinity College, Cambridge, where he studied oriental languages under Edward Granville Browne, and was a friend and classmate of Jawaharlal Nehru, who later became the first prime minister of independent India. Philby passed the Indian Civil Service exam in 1907 and reached India the following year. In 1910, he married Dora Johnston, with his distant cousin Bernard Law Montgomery as best man. In addition to their son, Kim, born in 1912, they had three daughters: Diana, Helena and Patricia. The British historian Robert Lacey wrote that Philby was "conceited, irascible, and thoroughly perverse". Arnold Wilson wrote that Philby was "one of those men who are apt to assume that everything they come across, from a government to a fountain-pen, is constructed on wrong principles, and is capable of amendment", leading Philby to reply that he "had never yet the good fortune to encounter either a perfect government or a perfect fountain-pen".

== Arabist ==
In late 1915, Percy Cox recruited Philby as head of the finance branch of the British administration in Baghdad. The position included fixing compensation for property and business owners. The mission was to organise the Arab Revolt against the Ottoman Turks and to protect the oil fields in Abadan and the Shatt al Arab, which were a source of fuel for the Royal Navy. The revolt was organised with the promise of creating a unified Arab state, or Arab federation, from Aleppo, Syria, to Aden, Yemen. Gertrude Bell was his first controller and taught him the finer arts of espionage. In 1916 he became Revenue Commissioner for the British Occupied Territories.

In November 1917, Philby was sent to the interior of the Arabian Peninsula as head of a mission to Ibn Saud, the chieftain who professed Wahhabism, the movement within Sunni Islam, and a bitter enemy of Hussein bin Ali, Sharif of Mecca, who led the Hashemites and the Arab Revolt, who were both contenders for "King of the Arabs". Cox had wanted Ibn Saud to attack the Kingdom of Hali, which had supported the Ottoman Empire. The British mission of four officers which arrived in Riyadh, the capital of the Nejd, doubled in one month the total number of Westerners known to have visited Riyadh in all of its recorded history. The Nejd region in central Arabia was so little known in the West at the time that the precise location of Riyadh was a mystery to Western cartographers who did not know the latitude and longitude of Riyadh. Lacey wrote that in Western maps in the early 20th century "Riyadh was a dot placed capriciously somewhere in the central wilderness". On 30 November 1917, Philby arrived in Riyadh after riding across the Arabian desert on a camel. Upon entering the royal palace, he was taken to see a "little old man somewhat inclined to stoutness, sharp-featured and bright-eyed" who was generous in supplying coffee and then retired. At that point, Philby realised "another person had been in the room all the time...a very giant of a man" who introduced himself as Abdul Aziz al-Saud, the Emir of the Nejd, also known as Ibn Saud, who had been waiting respectfully for his father to leave the room before speaking.

Philby greatly liked and admired Ibn Saud, whom he presented as a romantic hero. Philby's attitude to Ibn Saud bordered on hero worship. Reflecting his disenchantment with modern Britain, Philby saw Abdul Aziz as a sort of noble savage, a man unaffected by modern civilisation who because he was "primitive" was a better and nobler man than more "civilised" people. Philby secretly began to favour Ibn Saud even though British policy supported Sherif Hussein. Philby completed a crossing from Riyadh to Jeddah by a "backdoor" route to demonstrate that Saud, not Hussein, was in control of the Arabian highlands. Philby who prided himself on his ability to travel over Arabia— at the time a region that few Westerners had ever visited—kept his distance from the Ikhwan (Arabic for "the brotherhood"), a ferociously fanatical Wahhabi movement notorious for their practice of shooting anyone who refused their offers to convert to Wahhabism. In 1918, Philby went within 3 miles of the Ikhwan base at Artawiya, and watched the Ikhwan via his binoculars. For his safety, Philby chose not to go any closer to Artawiya. Philby, who was fluent in Arabic, liked to tease Ibn Saud by telling him it was possible to reach America by either travelling east or west as the earth was round, which led Ibn Saud to say that was not possible as he believed the earth was flat. When Ibn Saud asked what language people in America spoke, Philby told him English, which confused Ibn Saud to no end as he heard that the people in America were Indians and he thought they spoke Hindi, leading Philby to explain to him that there was a difference between the indigenous peoples of the Americas vs. the peoples of the Indian subcontinent. Philby was allowed to meet the future kings of Saudi Arabia who were boys at the time, namely Saud, Faisal, and Fahad.

In November 1918, Britain and France issued the Anglo-French Declaration to the Arabs, which promised self-determination. Philby felt there was a betrayal of that assurance, along with others made in the Balfour Declaration and the Sykes-Picot Agreement, of the promise of a single unified Arab nation. Philby argued that Ibn Saud was a "democrat" guiding his affairs "by mutual counsel", as laid out in the Quran, in contrast to George Curzon's support for Hussein. Tensions between the Hussein bin Ali, the Sharif of Mecca who ruled the Hejaz vs. Ibn Saud the Emir of the Nejd increased after the war as both men sought to rule Arabia. In October 1919, Ibn Saud sent his Foreign Minister, his 14-year-old son, Crown Prince Faisal, to London to seek British mediation of his dispute with the Sharif of Mecca. None of the major London hotels would allow Faisal and the Nejdi delegation to stay as Faisal's slaves had a disconcerting habit of starting fires anywhere they wanted to brew coffee for Crown Prince Faisal. Philby, who served as the host for Faisal, was forced to have the Nejdi delegation stay at a hostel for Indian Army orderly officers at St. George's Road as it was the only establishment that was willing to accept Faisal and his party. The sight of Faisal and his party dressed in traditional Arabian robes staying at a cheap hostel attracted the attention of the British newspapers and on 30 October 1919 King George V received Crown Prince Faisal at Buckingham Palace to make up for the slight. After the 1920 Iraqi revolt against the British, Philby was appointed Minister of Internal Security in Mandatory Iraq.

In November 1921, Philby was named chief head of the Secret Service in Mandatory Palestine, worked with T. E. Lawrence and met his American counterpart, Allen Dulles. In late 1922, Philby travelled to London for extensive meetings with parties involved in the Palestine question, including Winston Churchill, George V, Edward, Prince of Wales, Walter Rothschild, 2nd Baron Rothschild, Wickham Steed and Chaim Weizmann.

== Adviser to Ibn Saud ==
Philby's view was that the interests of both the British and the Saud family would be best served by uniting the Arabian Peninsula under one government stretching from the Red Sea to the Persian Gulf, with the Saudis supplanting the Hashemites as Islamic "Keepers of the Holy Places" and protecting shipping lanes along the Suez Canal–Aden–Mumbai (then Bombay) route.

Philby was forced to resign his post in 1924 over differences about allowing Jewish immigration to Palestine. He was found to have had unauthorised correspondence with Ibn Saud and to have sent confidential information, which carried with it the connotation of espionage. Shortly afterward, Ibn Saud began to call for the overthrow of the Hashemite dynasty, with Philby advising him on how far he could go in occupying the Hejaz without incurring the wrath of the British, the principal power in the Middle East. The principle reason why Ibn Saud chose not to invade the Hejaz was the £60,000 annual subsidy in gold coins paid to him by the British government and in 1923 Britain ceased paying the subsidy, which inspired Ibn Saud to invade the Hejaz. At the same time, Britain also ceased paying the £25,000 subsidy in gold coins per month to the Hussein, the Sharif of Mecca. Without British gold, the authority of the Sharif of Mecca promptly collapsed as he was not able to bribe the Bedouin tribal chiefs to fight for him. In March 1924, Hussein bin Ali visited his son Abdullah, the Emir of Transjordan, and Philby noticed the Sharif refused to use an automobile as he instead rode a mule from Aqaba to Ma'an to meet the Emir Abdullah. Philby wrote about the 71 year old Sharif riding a mule across the desert: "He never seemed to wilt and whenever I saw him on the way he was riding upright, stiff as a ramrod". The Sharif of Mecca was a very unpopular ruler owing to his rapacious corruption and cruelty and it was only the monthly subsidy of British gold that kept the Bedouin tribal chiefs loyal to him. On 5 March 1924 upon hearing the abolition of the caliphate in Turkey, Hussein bin Ali proclaimed himself the new caliph and declared that henceforward all Muslims now owed him their loyalty. The decision of Hussein to proclaim himself caliph sparked outrage all over the Muslim world with the general feeling being that the Sharif had no right to call himself caliph. In August 1924, Ibn Saud declared jihad on Hussein for his sacrilegious act in proclaiming himself caliph. The Nejdi invasion of the Hejaz went very well as the Ikhwan fighting for Ibn Saud crushed the army of the Sharif who proved quite unwilling to fight for him without British gold. On 16 October 1924, the defeated Sharif of Mecca abdicated as King of the Hejaz and fled the Hejaz, never to return. All the Hashemites held at the end of October 1924 were the cities of Medina and Jeddah. On 17 December 1925, the war ended with Jeddah, the last stronghold of the Hashemites surrendering to Ibn Saud. In 1925, Philby claimed that Ibn Saud had brought unprecedented order into Arabia. The new kingdom of the Hejaz and the Nejd was later renamed the Kingdom of Saudi Arabia in 1932.

Philby settled in Jeddah and became a partner in a trading company. Over the next few years, he became famous as an international writer and explorer. Philby personally mapped on camel back what is now the Saudi–Yemeni border on the Rub' al Khali. In his unique position, he became Ibn Saud's chief adviser in dealing with the British Empire and the other Western powers. He converted to Islam in 1930. Upon his conversion to Islam in August 1930, he was given the new name of Abdullah, which is Arabic for "Slave of Allah". The merchants of Jeddah joked that Philby's Muslim name should have been Abdulqirsh, which is Arabic for "Slave of Sixpence" on the account of his greed. Philby was an atheist and his reasons for converting to Islam were cultural, not spiritual, namely that he wanted to become part of the social life of the court of Ibn Saud, which he could not do as an infidel. In 1931, Ibn Saud gave Philby the gift of a slave girl, Mariam, who served as his sex slave. Lacey wrote that after becoming a Muslim Philby "became a fully fledged member of that circle of boon companions, half Privy Council, half gang of chums, who went everywhere with Abdul Aziz [Ibn Saud], chatting, laughing and arguing, discussing politics one minute, playing practical jokes the next".

In 1931, Philby invited Charles Richard Crane to Jeddah to facilitate exploration of the kingdom's subsoil oil. Crane was accompanied by noted historian George Antonius, who acted as translator. Lacey wrote that Philby greatly embellished his role in the discovery of oil in Saudi Arabia, writing: "If you read his own accounts-and there are several-Philby was in there from the very beginning. It was he who, in the autumn of 1930, started off the whole story of Saudi oil by telling Abdul Aziz [Ibn Saud] in his car at Taif that he was 'like a man sleeping on top of buried treasure'; it was he who told the king about Charles Crane; it was he who arranged for Crane to come down from Jeddah from Egypt-and later Philby even published his displeasure that 'Mr. Crane never so much as sent a postcard of thanks for the part I had played'". In May 1932, Philby was in London to give a speech about his crossing of the Rub' al Khali, the "Empty Quarter" of Arabia, when he was contacted by Albert Halstead of the American embassy in London who wanted to introduce Philiby to Francis Loomis of the Standard Oil of California (SoCal). Contrary to what Philby later claimed, he assumed that Loomis wanted to meet him to hear about his crossing of the Rub' al Khali, and he was surprised when he learned Loomis was instead interested in oil. Because oil had been discovered in Iran in 1908, it was assumed that the same geological deposit of oil that had been found on the northern end of the Persian Gulf might also extend to the southern end of the Persian Gulf. Besides for being fluent in Arabic, Philby had the advantage of being allowed to enter the Muslim holy city of Mecca (where Ibn Saud often stayed), which all non-Muslims were banned from entering while the oil company executives stayed in Jeddah. The principle revenue in Saudi Arabia prior to the discovery of oil was taxing the pilgrims making the hajj to Mecca, and the Great Depression had drastically lowered the number of Muslims making the hajj to Mecca, causing a crisis in Saudi Arabia. In early 1932, Ibn Saud had told a British diplomat: "I swear by Allah as a Muslim that I have no money for my children, for my family, and I know not if they will have money for food and clothing". At the same time, Ibn Saud had complained that the royal cars never seemed to have any petrol, leading him to dispatch Philby to investigate. Philby soon found out that the royal chauffeurs had not been paid for the last five months and were stealing the petrol to support their families.

In May 1932, SoCal sought out Philby in its quest to obtain an oil concession in Saudi Arabia, ultimately signing Philby as a paid adviser to SoCal. On 11 July 1932, Philby told Loomis that Ibn Saud wanted cash in the form of gold sovereigns in exchange for an oil concession and was not interested in the fine print of any agreement. Philby, in turn, recognised that competition by foreign interests would get a better deal for the Saudi king, made contact with George Martin Lees, the chief geologist of the Anglo-Persian Oil Company, to alert him to SoCal's interest in gaining oil exploration rights in Saudi Arabia. Anglo-Persian was one of five international partners in the Iraq Petroleum Company (IPC) through which it pursued its interest in the Saudi concession. Philby told Ibn Saud that the best deal he could get would be £100,000 British gold sovereigns, considering that no oil had actually been found in Saudi Arabia yet. Lloyd Hamilton, the lawyer who represented SoCal during the talks in Jeddah in 1932-1933 paid Philby a secret $1,000 month "retainer" to advance SoCal's right to the oil concessions. In March 1933, IPC sent a representative, Stephen Longrigg, to join negotiations with the Saudi government in Jeddah. However, Philby's primary loyalty was to the Saudi king. Although he was being paid by SoCal, he kept the arrangement a secret from Longrigg.

The IPC were only half-hearted in seeking oil concessions in Saudi Arabia as their geologists were not entirely convinced there was oil in Saudi Arabia and the Great Depression had caused the price of oil to hit all-time lows. The primary interest for the IPC was keeping the American oil companies out of the Middle East, which was rapidly became clear as SoCal offered much higher bids for the right to a Saudi oil concession than the IPC. Philby's main role in the talks was to spark a bidding war that ensured that SoCal paid more for a Saudi oil concession than otherwise would have been the case. During the talks in 1932–1933, Philby sought to increase tensions by telling the rival oil executives in Jeddah cryptic statements that gave the impression that the other side was willing to pay more for a Saudi oil concession. In May 1933, IPC instructed Longrigg to withdraw from Jeddah and to leave SoCal free to conclude negotiations with Saudi Arabia for a 60-year contract to obtain the exclusive concession for exploration and extraction of oil in the al-Hasa region along the Persian Gulf. Ibn Saud did not believe that his kingdom actually had any oil and was more interested in an upfront payment in gold than any long-time rights for revenue from an oil concession. In 1933, the United States did not even maintain diplomatic relations with Saudi Arabia and Ibn Saud had preferred to award an oil concession to a British company as Britain was the hegemonic power in the Middle East. Despite what Philby later claimed, the decisive moment in the talks came when Sir Andrew Ryan, the British plenipotentiary-minister to Saudi Arabia told Ibn Saud to accept SoCal's offer as it was "money for nothing" as Ryan doubted that Saudi Arabia even had oil. The IPC was willing to offer £10,000 gold sovereigns for an oil concession while SoCal was willing to offer Ibn Saud £50,000 gold sovereigns for an oil concession. On 9 May 1933, Ibn Saud signed a contract with SoCal giving them the exclusive rights to an oil concession in exchange for an upfront payment of £35,000 gold sovereigns, another £20,000 gold sovereigns after 18 months, and £5,000 gold sovereigns in rental fees, which would increase to £50,000 gold sovereigns in monthly rent if any oil was discovered.

By 1934, in an effort to safeguard the port of Aden, Britain had no fewer than 1,400 "peace treaties" with the various tribal rulers of the hinterlands of what became Yemen. Philby undermined British influence in the region, however, by facilitating the entry of American commercial interests, followed by a political alliance between the US and the Saud dynasty.

In 1936, SoCal and Texaco pooled their assets together into what later became ARAMCO (Arabian–American Oil Company). The United States Department of State described ARAMCO as the richest commercial prize in the history of the planet. Philby represented Saudi interests. In 1937 when the Spanish Civil War broke out, Philby arranged for his son, Kim Philby, to become a war correspondent for The Times. On 16 March 1938 the oil prospectors for SoCal at Well Number 7 in Dhahran discovered the world's richest vein of oil, which marked the beginning of the Saudi oil industry. In May 1939, the first shipment of oil from Saudi Arabia to go abroad left on an oil tanker, the D.G. Schofield, which set sail for America.

== Philby Plan ==
Philby, then known as an anti-Zionist, outlined a plan to reach a compromise with Zionism, after consultation with Arab leaders, and it was reported in The New York Times in October 1929. The Philby Plan foresaw a shared confirmation of the Balfour Declaration in the minimal sense of Palestine as the "Jewish national home" without being opposed to the maximal interpretation of the Balfour declaration as a call for a Jewish state in Palestine. The plan called for continued Jewish immigration into Palestine in exchange for a renunciation by Zionists of any desire to seek political dominance. Representation of the two groups would be based on respecting the numerical proportions between both groups. Judah Magnes, chancellor of the Hebrew University of Jerusalem, and a member of Brit Shalom, reacted to the proposal positively, and suggested alterations in order to secure guarantees for the Jewish minority. The Philby Plan was subsequently modified to allow for some sort of Jewish state in Palestine in order to gain the acceptance of the Zionist leaders.

As related in his memoirs, David Ben Gurion, who would become Israel's first prime minister, met Philby on 18 May 1937 at the Athenaeum Club, London. Ben Gurion attempted to use Philby as an intermediary to reach an agreement between the Zionist Movement and King Ibn Saud. A few days after their meeting, Philby sent to Ben Gurion a draft treaty by which the Zionists would renounce the Balfour Declaration in exchange for being welcomed to the Middle East by an Arab Federation, headed by Ibn Saud. However, several clauses of the draft treaty were unacceptable to Ben Gurion. In particular, Philby had proposed that Palestine would be "open to the immigration of all those seeking to become its citizens, regardless of race and creed" and refused to mention specific Jewish immigration. To Ben Gurion, that would have defeated the whole aim of Zionism. Ben Gurion sent Philby a counterproposal based on what Ben Gurion regarded as the indispensable minimum Zionist aspirations to which Philby never replied.

Philby's plans for a confederation headed by Ibn Saud with a Jewish "national Home' in Palestine never seems to have interested Ibn Saud, but gained support of Winston Churchill along with the Zionist leaders Lewis Namier and Chaim Weizmann. The romantic image of Ibn Saud as the "desert king" who was more of an "authentic" Arab than the corrupt, Westernised monarchs of Egypt, Transjordan and Iraq was the main reason for the support of Churchill, Namier, and Weizmann for the Philby Plan. The image of Ibn Saud as an "authentic Arab" who was "independent" of the West led to the conclusion that any plan endorsed by him would gain the acceptance of all the Arabs. On 12 March 1941, Churchill told Weizmann that the Philby Plan was the best solution to the "Palestine Question" as Churchill found the rival Jewish and Arab claims to the Palestine Mandate deeply vexing and wished to find some compromise to the intractable dispute. Subsequently, several other leading figures such as the South African prime minister General Jan Smuts and the India Secretary Leo Amery accepted the Philby Plan as the best solution to the problems of the Middle East. The British historian Stephen Dockter wrote that the Philby Plan was impractical not least because Philby was not speaking on behalf of Ibn Saud as he claimed to be. Ibn Saud was willing to allow a Jewish presence in Palestine, but would never accept a Jewish state in Palestine, which he regarded as Muslim land in its entirety. Finally, the plan proposed that the Hashemite monarchs of Iraq and Transjordan accept Ibn Saud as their overlord, which was very unlikely given the long-standing feud between the Hashemite and al-Saud families. In 1924, Ibn Saud had deposed Hussein bin Ali al-Hashemite as King of the Hejaz, who was the father of Emir Abdullah of Transjordan and the great-grandfather of King Faisal II of Iraq, which would have presented serious problems for the Philby plan. Finally, the plan assumed that Ibn Saud as the leader of the proposed confederation would be willing to serve British interests, which showed a major misunderstanding of Ibn Saud who wanted to be an independent and to serve no-one. In November 1941, Churchill abandoned the Philby Plan and decided to "get on with the war" with the problems of the Middle East to be resolved after the war. Dockter wrote that Churchill's willingness to accept the Philby Plan reflected his Victorian understanding of the Muslim world as a place whose leaders did not have agendas of their own and could be made to serve British interests because what was best for Britain was always in the best interests of everyone, an assumption not necessarily shared by the peoples of the Middle East.

== Negotiations with Germany and Spain ==
Philby later began secret negotiations with Germany and Spain on Saudi Arabia's role in the event of a general European war. The discussions allowed neutral Saudi Arabia to sell oil to neutral Spain, which would then be transported to Germany. John Loftus, who worked in the United States Department of Justice Office of Special Investigations Nazi-hunting unit, claimed that Adolf Eichmann, on a mission to the Middle East, met with Philby "during the mid-1930s". The discovery of oil in Saudi Arabia in 1938 had made Ibn Saud into an important world leader. In January 1939, Saudi Arabia established diplomatic relations with Germany, and in February 1939 a Saudi emissary arrived at Berchtesgarten to see Adolf Hitler in the Berghof high up in the Bavarian Alps to tell him "that it is our foremost aim to see the friendly and intimate relations with the German Reich developed to the utmost limits". Dr. Fritz Grobba visited Riyadh in January–February 1939 to see Ibn Saud who told him he "hated the English" and looked forward to the day when Germany would replace Britain as the world's foremost power. Grobba described Philby as a leading pro-German voice at the court of Ibn Saud who pushed for an alliance of the kingdom with the Reich. In July 1939, a contract was signed for Germany to deliver 4, 000 rifles plus ammunition to Saudi Arabia.

== The Hythe by-election ==
Philby, previously a member of the Labour Party, fought a by-election held on 20 July 1939 for the parliamentary constituency of Hythe, Kent. He stood for the anti-Semitic British People's Party (BPP) which had been founded by Lord Tavistock in April 1939. Despite his later post-war claims to have not shared the ideology of the BPP, Philby was a founding member of the BPP and sat on the National Executive of the BPP alongside Lord Tavistock, John Beckett, Ben Greene, John Scanlon, and Lord Lymington. Other members of the BPP included Robert Gordon-Canning, Anthony Ludovici and Henry Williamson. During the by-election, Philby declared "no cause whatever is worth the spilling of human blood" and the "protection of the small man against big business". Philby was recruited by Lord Tavistock to run as the BPP candidate for the by-election. Philby in his 1948 memoir Arabian Days downplayed his commitment to the BPP as he wrote "...I was approached by Lord Tavistock, John Beckett and Ben Greene of a new and small organisation called the British People's Party, with those general outlook I had no sympathy, though I fully and cordially agreed with the anti-war attitude. Eventually I agreed to fight the Hythe by-election". Reflecting the way that various extreme right movements in Britain often co-operated, Lady Domville, the wife of Admiral Barry Domvile, the leader of The Link, campaigned hard for Philby in the Hythe by-election. Joining her were Lady Grace Pearson along with a number of activists from the British Union of Fascists-who came mostly from London- who descended upon Hythe and the other small towns of Kent in order to campaign for Philby.

The major issue in the by-election was the Danzig crisis with Philby attacking the Prime Minister Neville Chamberlain for having "just sat back to see what would happen". Philby took the Chamberlain government to task for the "guarantee" of Poland which he felt was pushing Britain towards an unnecessary war with Germany and favoured abandoning Poland to its fate rather than risking a war against the Reich. Philby and other speakers on his behalf such as Admiral Barry Domvile, Lord Tavistock, John Beckett, Ben Greene, Lady Pearson, Captain Vincent Collier and Dr. Meyrick Booth devoted much of their time to praising Germany and blaming the entire British Jewish community for having supposedly pushed Britain to the brink of war with Germany in the Danzig crisis. One of the pamphlets produced by the BPP in the by-election, Alien Money Power in Great Britain attacked the Conservative candidate Rupert Brabner by claiming he worked for a London law firm run by Jews. Philby in a speech in the by-election on 8 July 1939 praised Hitler for having "restored one of the greatest races in the world to the position of one of the foremost nations in the world as it was in present times". The British historian Martin Pugh wrote that the campaign for Philby was "amateurish" with Beckett at one point reporting false returns on his canvassing and then saying "That's done. Let's go to the pub!" Philby won 576 votes in the by-election. Philby lost his deposit.

== The Second World War ==
Soon afterward, the Second World War began. He is recorded as having referred to Adolf Hitler as un homme très fin ("a most sophisticated man"). In August 1940, Philby had decided to visit the United States to give defeatist lectures to isolationist groups opposed to the pro-Allied neutrality of President Franklin D. Roosevelt as Philby believed that Germany was invincible and the theme of his speeches during his planned American tour was that it was folly for the United States to support the United Kingdom.

When he travelled to Bombay, he was arrested on 3 August 1940 under Defence Regulation 18B, deported to England and there briefly interned. Shortly after his release from custody, Philby recommended his son, Kim, to Valentine Vivian, MI6 deputy chief, who recruited him into the British secret service. When Harold B. Hoskins of the United States State Department visited Ibn Saud in August 1943, he asked if the king would be willing to have an intermediary meet with Chaim Weizmann. Ibn Saud angrily responded that he was insulted by the suggestion that he could be bribed for £20 million to accept resettlement of Arabs from Palestine. Hoskins reports the king said Weizmann told him the promise of payment would be "guaranteed by President Roosevelt". A month later Weizmann wrote in a letter to Sumner Welles: "It is conceived on big lines, large enough to satisfy the legitimate aspirations of both Arabs and Jews, and the strategic and economic interests of the United States;... properly managed, Mr. Philby's scheme offers an approach which should not be abandoned".

== Suez Crisis ==
After Ibn Saud died in 1953, Philby openly criticised the successor, King Saud, by saying the royal family's morals were being picked up "in the gutters of the West". He was exiled to Lebanon in 1955. There, he wrote:

the true basis of Arab hostility to Jewish immigration into Palestine is xenophobia, and instinctive perception that the vast majority of central and eastern European Jews, seeking admission... are not Semites at all.... Whatever political repercussions of their settlement may be, their advent is regarded as a menace to the Semitic culture of Arabia... the European Jew of today, with his secular outlook... is regarded as an unwelcome intruder within the gates of Arabia.

In Beirut, he reconciled with Kim, and they lived together for a time. The son was reemployed by MI6 as an outside informer on retainer. Philby helped further his son's career by introducing him to his extensive network of contacts in the Middle East, including Lebanese President Camille Chamoun. Both were sympathetic to Gamal Abdel Nasser during the Suez Crisis in August 1956. Between Jack's access to ARAMCO and Kim's access to British intelligence, there was little they did not know about Operation Musketeer, the French and British plan to capture the Suez Canal. The Soviets exposed the entire plan in the United Nations and threatened Britain and France with "long-range guided missiles equipped with atomic warheads".

In 1955, Philby returned to live in Riyadh. In 1960, on a visit to Kim in Beirut, he suddenly became ill and was rushed to hospital. "The man whose life had been so eventful and panoramic, so daring and theatrical, now lay unconscious. He awoke only for a moment and murmured to his son, 'I am so bored'. And then he expired". He is buried in the Muslim cemetery in the Basta district of Beirut. His tombstone reads, "Greatest of Arabian Explorers".

== Academic interests ==
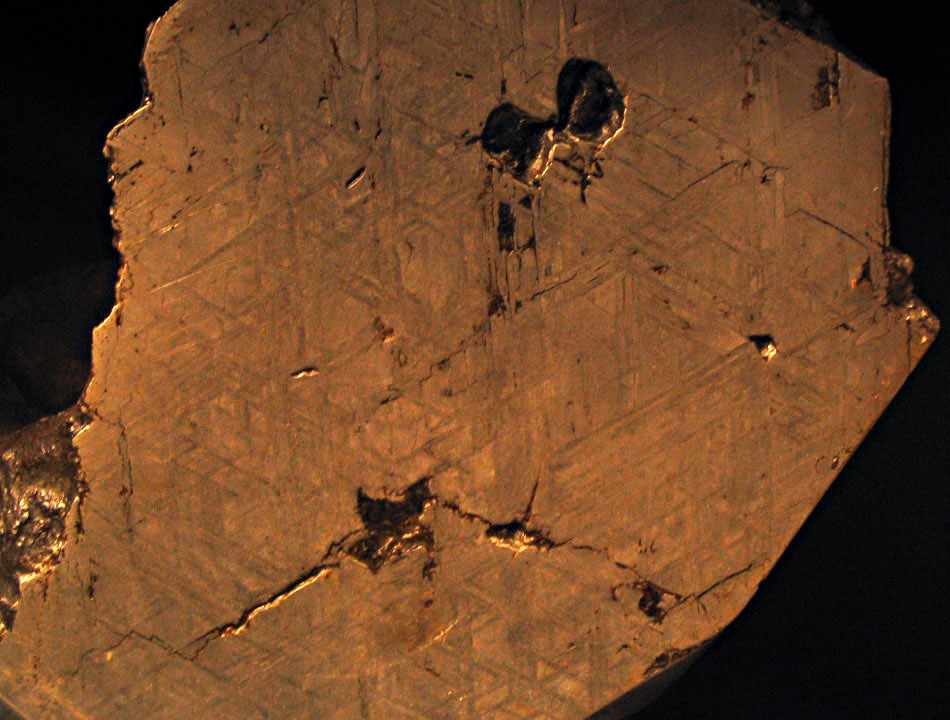
A Wabar meteorite etched section

In collaboration with George Latimer Bates he took an interest in the birds of the Arabian region. In his travels, he collected specimens for Bates and several new species were described from his specimens. These included the Arabian woodpecker (Desertipicus (now Dendrocopos) dorae), a subspecies (no longer valid) of a scops owl (Otus scops pamelae) and Philby's partridge (Alectoris philbyi). His specimens are held in the British Museum. His specimen packages were sometimes used to transport sensitive documents, a skin of a desert fox included survey maps inside it. He contributed to Bates' uncompleted work on the birds of Arabia. The manuscript was later used by Richard Meinertzhagen who produced Birds of Arabia (1954) giving little credit to Bates.

In 1932, while searching for the lost city of Ubar, he was the first Westerner to visit and describe the Wabar craters.

== Awards and legacy ==
In August 1917, he was appointed a Companion of the Order of the Indian Empire. In 1920, he was awarded the Royal Geographical Society Founder's Medal for his two journeys in South Central Arabia.

A subspecies of Middle Eastern lizard, Uromastyx ornata philbyi, and a partridge, Alectoris philbyi, are named in his honour.

Some authors have summarised Philby as a British traitor and an anti-Semite. They suggest that Philby never forgave the British government for ending his civil service career for sexual misconduct. Once recruited by MI6, according to those authors, Philby used his intelligence assignment to take revenge on the British government. With the extensive contacts he acquired as a British agent, Philby continued to betray British policy and to resist all efforts at creating a Jewish homeland throughout his life. Philby disclosed classified British intelligence to Ibn Saud during wartime, secretly helped secure American oil concessions in Saudi Arabia, double-crossed British competitors, created economic partnerships allied against British interests and for those of Nazi Germany with the help of Allen Dulles (later CIA Director) and worked with Nazi intelligence to sabotage efforts at creating a Jewish homeland.

Philby's 1955 book Saudi Arabia contains the only known account of the 1931 Saudi–Yemeni border skirmish.

The American scholar Jacob Goldberg noted that Philby with his varied interests in the archaeology, literature, politics, geography, and zoology of Arabia along with the accounts of his travels in Arabia has dominated the Arabian scholarship in a manner that no-one has ever managed. However, Goldberg wrote that Philby was not a reliable source on the history of Arabia owing to his hero worship of Ibn Saud, whom Philby regarded as being as close to a perfect man as possible. Furthermore, Goldberg noted that Philby had a strong antagonism towards his own country that verged on Anglophobia and in his account of Arabian history it was always the British who were at fault while Ibn Saud was always the wronged party. Goldberg wrote that Philby was the "official apologist" of Saudi Arabia in the West as evidenced by his 1955 polemical pamphlet about the Buraymi dispute Saudi Arabia Memorial, which laid out the Saudi claim to the oasis of Buraymi that was also claimed by Britain as the protecting power of the Sultan of Oman. Several passages from Saudi Arabia Memorial were incorporated verbatim into his 1955 book Saudi Arabia. Finally, Goldberg noted that even sympathetic observers commented that Philby "saw everything in black and white, without finer shades" which let him to reduce the history of Arabia down to a morality play, a constant struggle between his villains such as the duplicitous British vs. heroes such as his noble Saudis.

Goldberg noted that Philby aggressively engaged in historical distortion in his books. As an example, Goldberg noted that when Ibn Saud seized Riyadh in 1902 from Ibn Rasheed, he became a rebel against the Ottoman Empire and the Sublime Porte dispatched several expeditions in 1904 and 1905 with the aim of reasserting control over the Nejd. Faced with 7,000 troops of the German-armed and German-trained Ottoman Army marching into the Arabian desert in 1904, Ibn Saud appealed to Sir Percy Cox, the British resident in the Persian Gulf to make the Nejd into a British protectorate as a way to gain British support against the Sublime Porte; Cox did not answer Ibn Saud's appeals as the British did not care about the Nejd enough to risk a confrontation with the Ottoman. The British only cared about control of the coastal areas of Arabia around the Persian Gulf and had no interest in the interior of Arabia, a barely inhabited desert. Ultimately Ibn Saud was able to defeat the Ottomans on his own. In his histories, Philby did not admit that his hero Ibn Saud had tried hard to have the Nejd become a British protectorate, and mispresented Ibn Saud's letters to Cox as an appeals for "cordial understanding". Goldberg wrote that Philby's picture of British policy as anti-Saudi was misleading to say the least as the British were interested in curbing Saudi expansion to the Persian Gulf, but were content to let Ibn Saud rule the Nejd whereas the policy of the Sublime Porte was to incorporate the Nejd into the Ottoman Empire. Goldberg wrote in this way Philby gave a dishonest account of British policy in Arabia as he left the reader with the impression that the British were seeking to annex the Nejd. Likewise, Goldberg noted that Ibn Saud failed to gain the support of the British that he chose appeasement of the Sublime Porte as he feared that Ottomans would dispatch even more troops against him. Despite his battles with the Ottoman Army, Ibn Saud wrote several fawning letters in 1905 and 1906 professing his loyalty to the Ottoman Empire as he argued that he taken Riyadh in 1902 from Ibn Rasheed because it had belonged to his family until 1891, but that he was not disloyal to the Sultan-Caliph Abdul Hamid II. In several of his letters, Ibn Saud wrote that he was willing to submit to the Sublime Porte provided that the Ottomans allowed him to rule as the Emir of the Nejd. Goldberg noted that Philby failed to mention any of this in his books and instead portrayed the Ottomans as leaving the Nejd forever in April 1905 when in fact Ibn Saud handed over several forts to the Ottomans that month in exchange for the Sublime Porte allowing him to stay on as Emir. Goldberg noted Philby himself had written that the Ottomans were still in the Nejd in May 1906, 13 months after their supposed retreat in April 1905. Goldberg accused Philby of trying to "rewrite" the foundation of the modern Saudi state in a manner that glorified Ibn Saud as a "freedom-fighter".

== Works ==
- The Heart of Arabia: A Record of Travel & Exploration. (London: Constable) 1922.
- Arabia of the Wahhabis. (London: Constable) 1928.
- Arabia. (London: Ernest Benn) 1930.
- The Empty Quarter: being a description of the great south desert of Arabia known as Rub 'al Khali (London: Constable & Company Ltd) 1933. scanned book
- Harun al Rashid (London: P. Davies) 1933. About Harun al-Rashid
- Routes in south-west Arabia [map]: From surveys made in 1936 (Methuen & Co Ltd) 1936.
- Sheba's daughters; being a record of travel in Southern Arabia (London: Methuen & Co Ltd) 1939.
- A Pilgrim in Arabia (London: The Golden Cockerel Press), [1943].
- The Background of Islam: being a sketch of Arabian history in pre-Islamic times (Alexandria: Whitehead Morris) 1947.
- Arabian Days, an autobiography (London: R. Hale) 1948.
- Arabian Highlands (Ithaca, N.Y.: Cornell University Press) 1952. scanned book
- Arabian Jubilee (London: Hale) [1952]
- Sa′udi Arabia (London: Benn) 1955, New impression: Librairie du Liban, Beirut 1968
- The Land of Midian. (London: Ernest Bean Limited) 1957.
- Forty Years in the Wilderness (London: R. Hale) c1957.
- Arabian Oil Ventures (Washington: Middle East Institute) 1964.

== Personal and family life ==
Philby married Dora Johnston in September 1910. His second marriage was to a Saudi Arabian woman, Rozy al-Abdul Aziz.

His only son by his first wife, Dora Johnston, was Kim Philby, who became known worldwide as a double agent for the Soviet Union and defected to the Soviets in 1963. Khaled Philby, one of his three sons with his second wife, is the former United Nations Resident Coordinator (equivalent to an ambassador) in, among others, Kuwait and Turkmenistan.

== See also ==
- The Prize: The Epic Quest for Oil, Money, and Power
- Muhammad Asad
- King of the Sands

== Sources ==
- Kingmakers: the Invention of the Modern Middle East, Karl E. Meyer and Shareen Blair Brysac, W.W. Norton (2008) pp. 226–58.
- Dockter, Warren (2015). Churchill and the Islamic World Orientalism, Empire and Diplomacy in the Middle East. London: Bloomsbury Publishing. ISBN 9781786739858.
- Griffiths, Richard (1980). Fellow Travellers of the Right British Enthusiasts for Nazi Germany, 1933-9. London: Constable. ISBN 0571271324.
- Griffiths, Richard (2016). What Did You Do During the War? The Last Throes of the British Pro-Nazi Right, 1940-45. London: Taylor & Francis. ISBN 9781317495659.
- Pugh, Martin (2013). Hurrah for the Blackshirts! Fascists and Fascism in Britain Between the Wars. New York: Random House. ISBN 9781448162871.
- Princes of Darkness, Laurent Murawiec, Rowman and Littlefield (2005)
- Oxford Dictionary of National Biography, Oxford University Press (2004)
- Arabian Jubilee, H. StJ. B. Philby, Robert Hale, (1952)
- Philby of Arabia, Elizabeth Monroe, Faber & Faber (1973)
- The Secret War Against the Jews, John Loftus and Mark Aarons, St Martin's Press (1994)
- Arabia, the Gulf and the West Basic Books (1980)
- The House of Saud, David Holden and Richard Johns, Holt Rinehart and Winston (1981)
- Lacey, Robert (1981). The Kingdom. New York: Harcourt Brace Jovanovich. ISBN 0-15-147260-2.
- Goldberg, Jacob (April 1985). "Philby as a Source for Early Twentieth-Century Saudi History: A Critical Examination". Middle Eastern Studies. 21 (2): 223–243. doi:10.1080/00263208508700625.
- The Philby Conspiracy, Bruce Page, David Leitch and Phillip Knightley, Doubleday (1968)
- Saudi Arabia and the United States, 1931–2002 by Josh Pollack (2002)
- Mirage: Power, Politics, And the Hidden History of Arabian Oil, by Aileen Keating, Prometheus Books (2005)
