= Commando (aircraft) =

Consolidated Liberator II aircraft variant

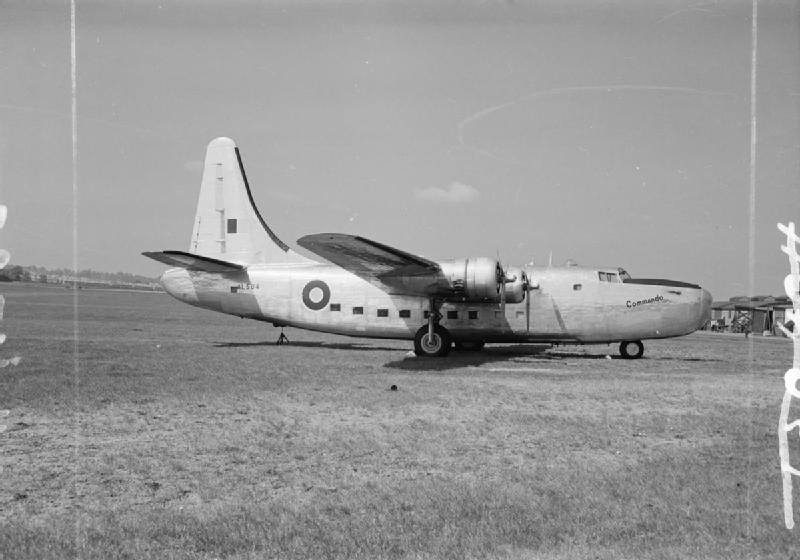
- Liberator II AL504 Commando, which disappeared on 27 March 1945. The picture shows the aircraft in its later single-fin and rudder configuration and lack of camouflage paint

General information
- Type: Consolidated Liberator II
- Owners: Royal Air Force
- Serial: AL504

History
- In service: July 1942 – 27 March 1945
- Fate: Disappeared over the North Atlantic Ocean en route to the Azores

Commando (Air Ministry serial number AL504) was a very long range Consolidated Liberator II aircraft adapted for passenger transport, to serve as the personal aircraft of Prime Minister Winston Churchill. Commando disappeared without a trace on 27 March 1945 over the North Atlantic Ocean, while on a flight from RAF Northolt to Lajes Field in the Azores, en route to Ottawa in Canada. The cause of the disappearance of the aircraft remains unknown to this day.

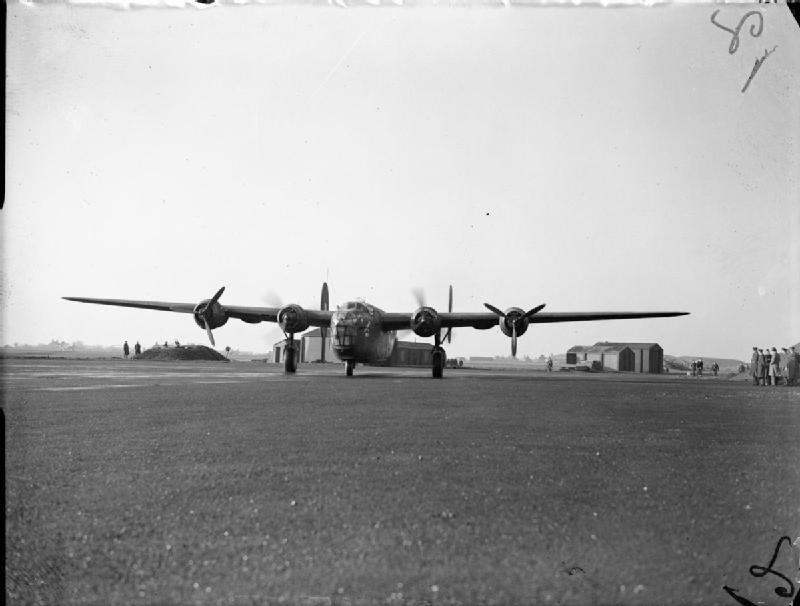
January 1943. AL504 Commando, VIP taxying at Lyneham, Wiltshire, with Winston Churchill on board returning from Casablanca

== Background ==
Volunteer pilot William Vanderkloot, a US citizen serving with RAF Ferry Command since June 1941, delivered a specially modified long-range Consolidated Liberator II in July 1942. Vanderkloot was ordered to RAF headquarters, where he was asked by Sir Charles Portal, Chief of the Air Staff, if there was a safe, direct route from England to Cairo, by air in the Liberator which he had just delivered to Prestwick Airport. Vanderkloot informed Portal that the flight was possible with one stop in Gibraltar. Initially heading eastwards from Gibraltar, staying over the sea in the afternoon, and then turning sharply south after dusk, flying over Spanish and Vichy French territory in Africa in darkness, before turning east again for the Nile, approaching Cairo from the south. Thus the danger from land-based enemy aircraft in North Africa and Sicily would be largely avoided without having to fly halfway around Africa.

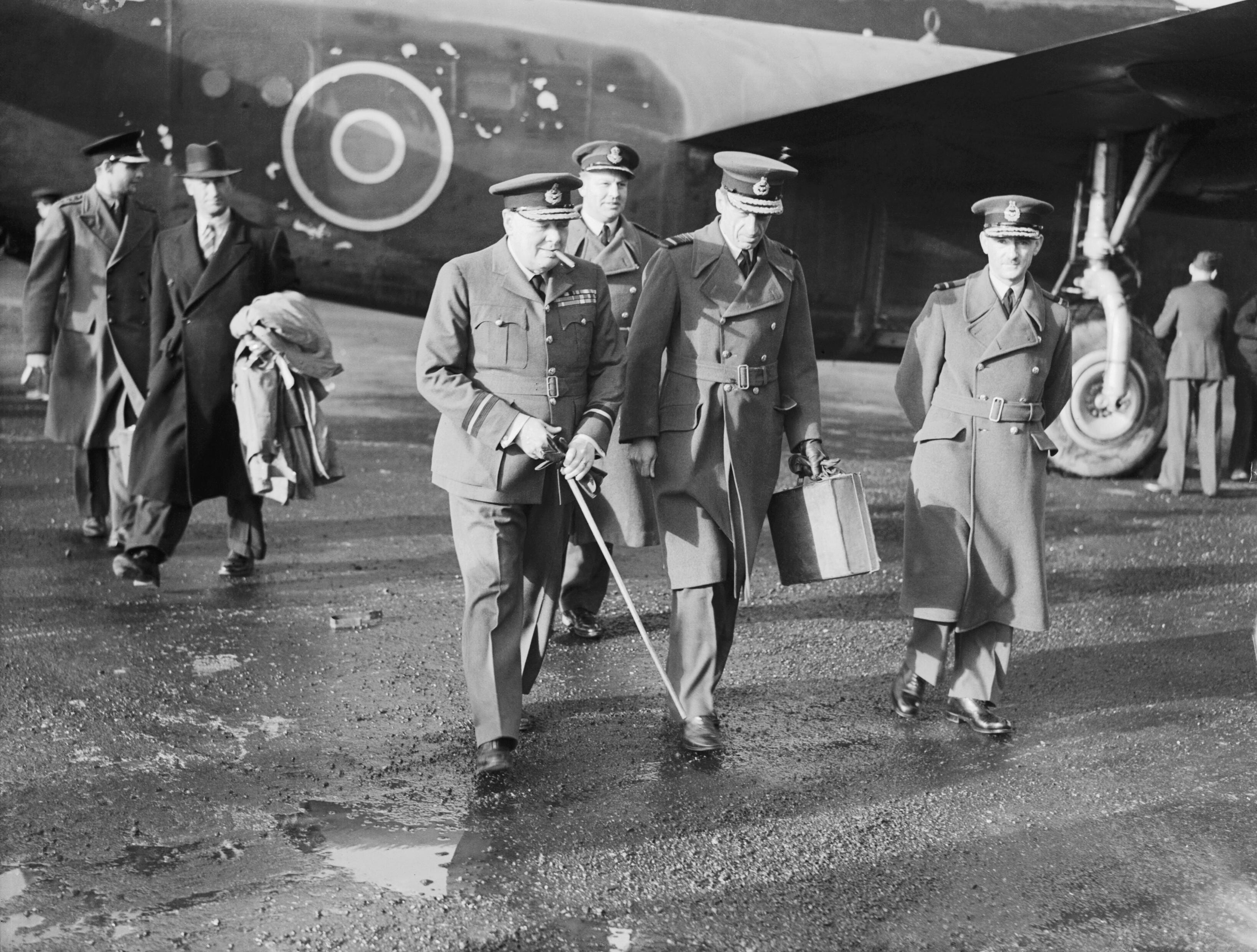
The Prime Minister, Winston Churchill in RAF uniform, accompanied by Air Chief Marshal Sir Charles Portal, Chief of the Air Staff, leaving Commando at RAF Lyneham, Wiltshire, on their return from the Casablanca Conference. The picture shows Commando in its initial dark earth and dark green with night black undersides standard RAF Bomber Command night bomber colour scheme in which it was delivered from the factory.

Portal told Vanderkloot to "stay handy to the telephone". The next day Vanderkloot was taken to Winston Churchill's office, No.10 Downing Street. Churchill, clad in robe and slippers, offered him a drink, beginning a relationship that had Vanderkloot flying the Prime Minister on sensitive diplomatic trips across war-torn Europe, Russia, North Africa and the Middle-East. "He took calculated risks," said his son, William III. "There was a lot more risk in flying back then. It was a frontier, and I think all the old pilots will say it, secretly to themselves, that they enjoyed being on their own. It was the wild blue yonder." As Churchill's pilot, Vanderkloot flew Lord Mountbatten to England in June 1942, conveyed the Prime Minister and Chief of the Imperial General Staff Alan Brooke to Egypt in August 1942 to replace Claude Auchinleck commander of the British Army in North Africa with Bernard Montgomery and also took Churchill to high-level talks in Moscow with Joseph Stalin, to Turkey to determine that country's wartime intentions, and to the Casablanca Conference in 1943.

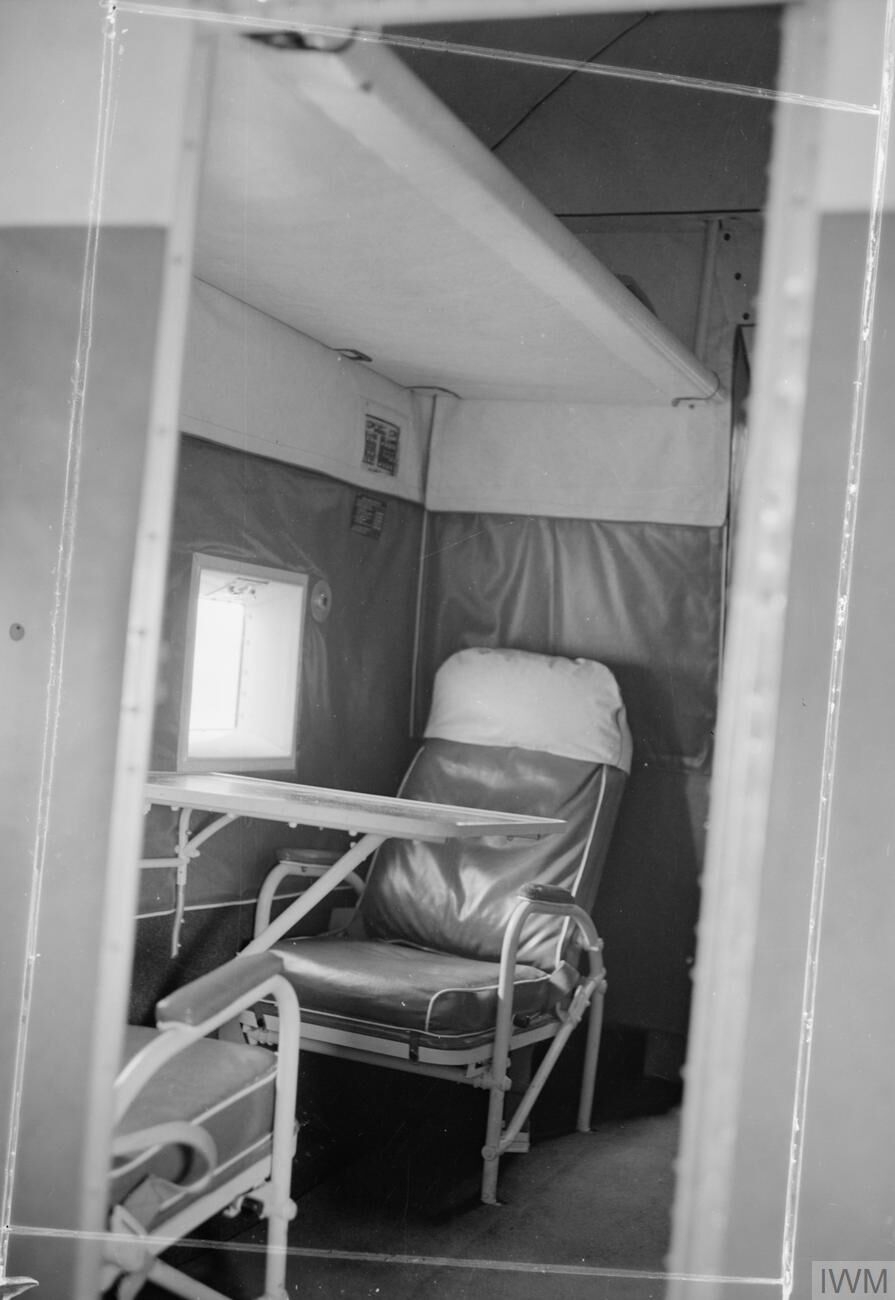
interior of AL504 Commando

On delivery Commando had a regular Liberator nose and tail configuration despite the internal modifications but was later converted to have a covered nose and also the same single tail fin used on the Consolidated PB4Y-2. The VIP ("Very Important Person[s]") interior had comfortable seating, an electric galley and even a bed, installed for Churchill. After the second extended trip, Churchill never again flew in Commando, instead switching to Ascalon, an Avro York (a transport aircraft based on the Lancaster bomber, with a larger fuselage) with an all-British crew. Vanderkloot and his mixed US/Canadian civilian crew were all recommended for British awards for their service, he and one other receiving honorary OBEs.

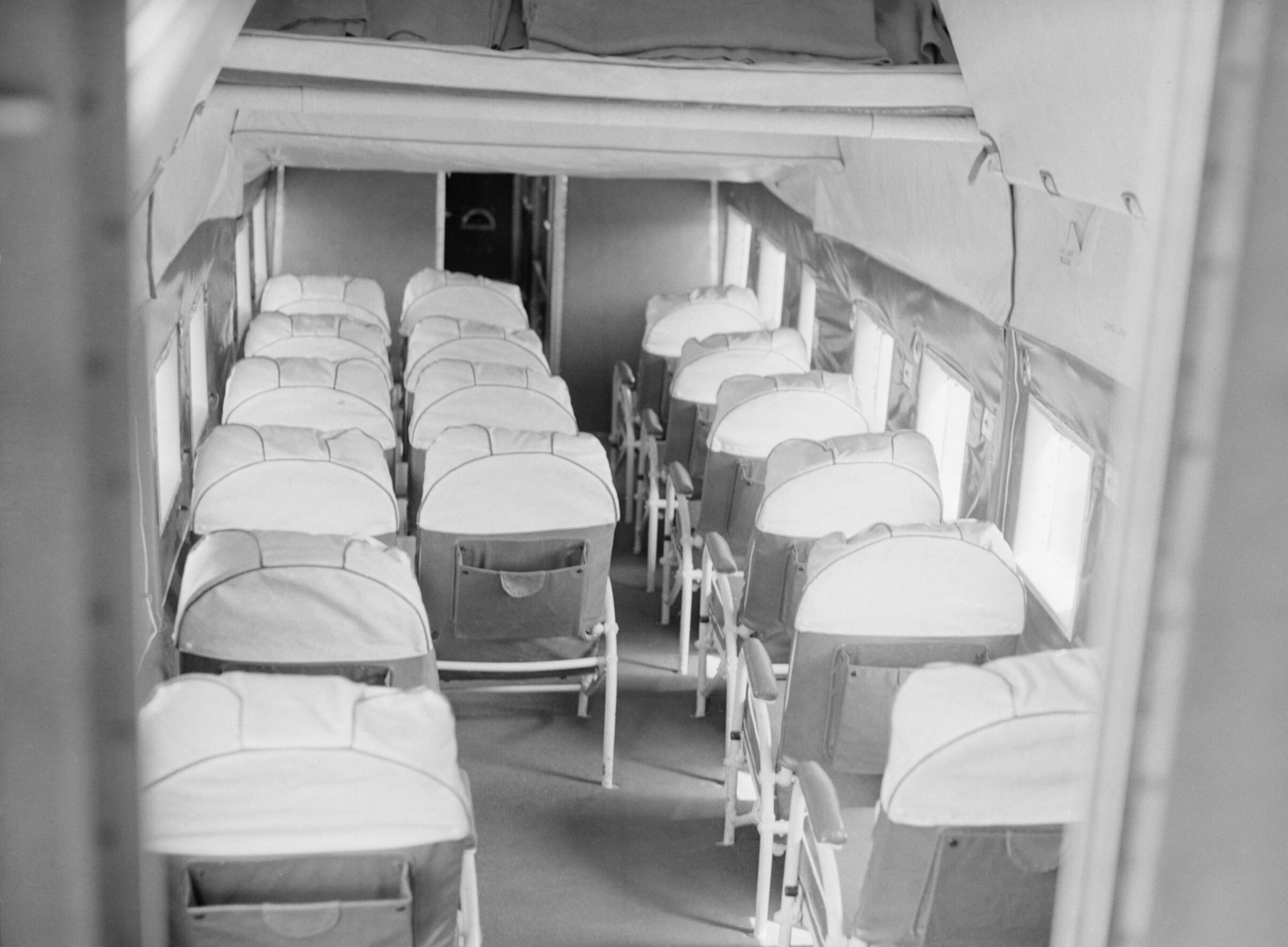
Interior of AL504 Commando

In September 1943 Liberator AL504 was withdrawn from VIP service and flown to a Tucson, Arizona USAAF base, where it underwent major modifications and emerged as a one-off transport, lengthened by seven feet, with single tail fin, extended fuselage, and upgraded engines. AL504 flew again in March 1944 as the trial version of the US Navy’s Consolidated RY Liberator Express transport. Vanderkloot and the crew continued to fly it for a time, one crew member's last logbook entry for AL504 is 24 November 1944.

Commando had served as Churchill's official aircraft during a critical period and later in the war was also used on occasion by other VIP's for their business in connection with the war effort. She also served with No. 45 Group Communications Flight (45 Gp Comms Flt), based at Dorval, near Montreal. It was well maintained and proved extremely reliable and had been flown from Montreal to Sydney, Australia, on 5 November 1944 by Air Commodore C J Powell CBE, RAF (Senior Air Staff Officer) RAF Transport Command.

Commando was the second of 139 VLR (Very Long Range) Liberator II aircraft delivered to the RAF mostly to be used by RAF Coastal Command on maritime patrol duty and anti-submarine warfare, escorting the supply convoys of merchant vessels and attacking and sinking German U-boats.

== Last flight ==
The Under-Secretary of State for Air Rupert Brabner DSO DSC, his deputy Sir John Abraham KBE CB, and the Air Member for Training Air Marshal Sir Peter Roy Maxwell Drummond KCB DSO & Bar OBE MC RAF needed to fly to Canada with other dignitaries to attend a ceremony marking the closure of the British Commonwealth Air Training Plan. Winston Churchill's former personal transport Commando was assigned as the VIP aircraft.

Flown by Wing Commander William Biddell OBE DFC, the aircraft took off from RAF Northolt at 23:00 hours GMT on Monday 26 March 1945 to fly to Ottawa, Canada, with a refueling stop at Lajes Field in the Azores. Routine contact was established between the aircraft and its base at 05:22 hours GMT in the morning with the flight proceeding as scheduled. The flight was proceeding routinely when the last contact was made with RAF Transport Command at RAF Prestwick at 07:16 hours GMT on the morning of 27 March 1945 in position 40°30'N 20°17'W by civilian Radio Officer Frederick Williams aboard the aircraft, to advise an estimated time of arrival of 08:10 hours at Lajes Field. There were no further signals.

=== Loss and searches ===
When Commando failed to arrive at Lajes Field, emergency calls were made by radio and air-sea searches initiated once the aircraft was classified as overdue. RAF Coastal Command, assisted by the Royal Navy, commenced a series of searches which were described by Prime Minister Winston Churchill in his announcement in the House of Commons on 28 March 1945. Close to the flight path which Commando would have been following over the ocean in towards Lajes Field, aircrew of the searching RAF Coastal Command aircraft spotted some yellow dinghies, a small amount of wreckage and an oil patch on the surface. It was 150–200 mi (130–170 nmi; 240–320 km) north-west of the Azores; there were no traces of any survivors. Little could be done and it was considered probable that Commando had crashed at sea while approaching the Azores.

=== Possible causes ===
- Radio or radio navigational aid failure was not considered an issue as the aircraft was flying in daylight and the Azores would probably have been located without difficulty.
- Engine failure was considered. The No. 2 engine had been changed during maintenance on 15 November 1944 and had 517 flying hours, the other three engines had each accumulated 466 flying hours and had been serviced on 16 November 1944. The aircraft carried its own flight engineer. Its previous civilian flight engineer, John Affleck, testified at the court of enquiry and reported that mention was made in a radio signal of an oil leak in the No. 2 engine which he believed might have resulted in a fire beside a fuel tank.
- Fuel shortage was considered unlikely, excepting a catastrophic leak, as the aircraft carried considerably more than sufficient for its flight to the Azores.
- Pilot error was considered unlikely as the aircraft was flown by a highly experienced RAF Transport Command transatlantic pilot who had 635 flying hours on Liberators and 3,780 flying hours in total.
- Navigational error was discounted as the traces of wreckage were found close to the expected flight path.
- Structural failure was considered, but was not confirmed due to lack of evidence from crash debris.

=== The crew ===
Pilot
Wing Commander William Hugh Biddell OBE DFC RAF, aged 28, a married man from Kent, was a regular service officer who had joined the Royal Air Force and been commissioned on 21 October 1935, promoted to flight lieutenant on 3 September 1939 serving as a flight commander in No. 206 Squadron RAF (206 Sqn) on maritime reconnaissance and anti-shipping duties. He was awarded a Distinguished Flying Cross on 14 June 1940 for bravery in combat with enemy aircraft over the Dunkirk evacuation beaches in May 1940. and also received a "Polish Cross for Gallantry" the same month for having flown the Polish General Wladyslaw Sikorski from Bordeaux to England escaping the German occupation forces. Biddell joined the staff of RAF Ferry Command on 22 January 1942, was promoted to temporary Wing Commander on 1 June 1942, and decorated as an Officer of the Order of the British Empire Military Division on 8 June 1944 for his work with RAF Transport Command.

Second Pilot
Flight Lieutenant Aubrey Norman Brodie RAFVR aged 24, from Birmingham, had joined the RAFVR in 1941, learned to fly in Canada and been commissioned 9 December 1943. He was rapidly promoted Flying Officer in June 1944 and then acting flight lieutenant.

Navigator
Flight Lieutenant David Buchanan RCAF aged 29, a married man from Winnipeg, Manitoba. He was a highly experienced Navigator with RAF Ferry Command who had flown on many trans-atlantic flights.

Second Navigator
Flight Lieutenant Kenneth George Shea RAAF aged 27 born at Launceston, Tasmania, he had taken part in many long range missions from Dorval, initially with RAF Transport Command and since 1 March 1945 with No. 231 Squadron RAF (231 Sqn) still involved in trans-atlantic flights. Promoted to Flight Lieutenant in February 1944 he had been awarded a King’s Commendation for Valuable Services in the Air on 1 September 1944.

Radio Officer
Mr. Frederick Walter Williams, a civilian, employed by RAF Transport Command aged 32 from Gloucester, Gloucestershire.

Flight Engineer
Warrant Officer Douglas James Spence (RCAF) aged 33 from Vancouver, a regular service RCAF flight engineer with 17 years service who had flown the trans-atlantic route many times. He was posthumously commissioned.

Flight Steward & Clerk
Mr. Victor Ian Claud James Bannister, a civilian employed by RAF Transport Command aged 29, a married man from London.

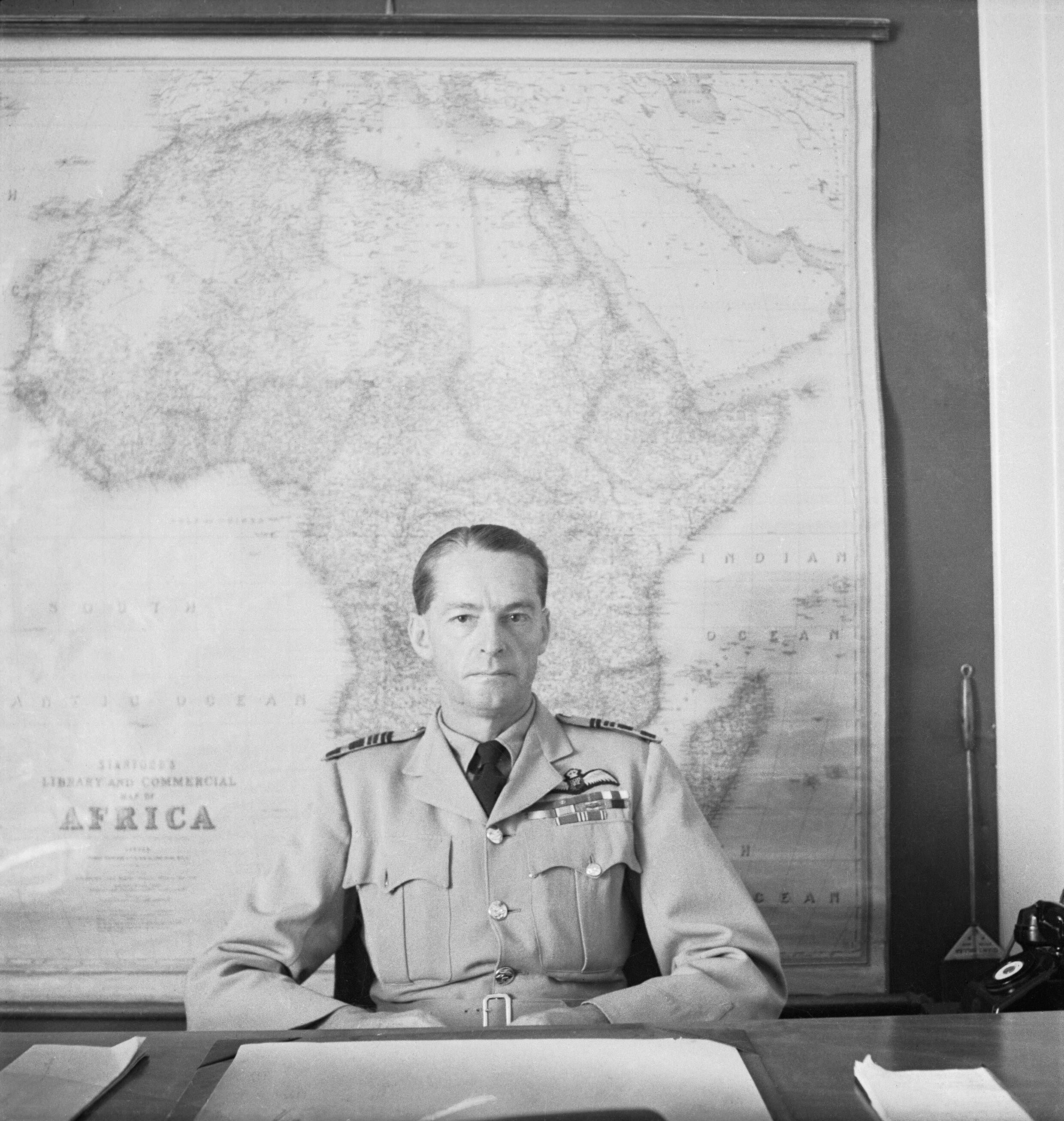
Air Marshal Sir Peter Drummond

=== The VIPs ===
Commander Rupert Arnold Brabner DSO DSC Royal Navy
(Parliamentary Under Secretary of State for Air) A 33-year-old married man. Brabner was an M.A. graduate of Cambridge University, elected Member of Parliament for Hythe, Kent and a serving Fleet Air Arm ace fighter pilot. He was born in Chelsea, London, on 29 October 1911. Educated at Felstead School, Essex and St. Catharine’s College, Cambridge and was an elected member of London County Council and then Conservative Party Member of Parliament from July 1939. He was decorated for his success as a Fleet Air Arm fighter pilot for actions over Malta. Brabner was "Technical Assistant" to the Fifth Sea Lord at the Admiralty 1943–44 and then "Assistant Government Parliamentary Whip" before being appointed Under Secretary of State for Air in November 1944.

Air Marshal Sir Peter Roy Maxwell Drummond KCB DSO & Bar OBE MC RAF
(Air Member for Training)

Sir John Bradley Abraham KBE CB
(Deputy Under Secretary of State (Air Ministry)) A 63-year-old married man from Radlett in Hertfordshire. Abraham joined the British Civil Service as a Boy in 1897, progressing to Class I Clerk at the Admiralty in 1912, and then "Assistant Principal Clerk" (Air Ministry) in 1918. Appointed a Companion of the Most Honourable Order of the Bath in January 1933 as Assistant Secretary of State at the Air Ministry. He was Knighted on 1 January 1942.

Mr. Henry Albert Jones CMG MC Croix de Guerre with Palm
(Air Delegation (Washington) and United Kingdom Air Liaison Mission (Ottawa)) A 51-year-old married man from Chingford. Jones had served in World War I with the Wiltshire Regiment and as an observer with the Royal Flying Corps being awarded a Military Cross for conspicuous gallantry in France, and also a Croix de Guerre 1914-1918 with Palm. After military service he was Gazetted to the Department of Overseas Trade as an "Intelligence Officer". Jones was British government official air historian and author of 31 published works documenting the official story of the war in the air 1914–18. He was seconded to the Cabinet Office in the 1930s and then to the Air Staff Secretariat in 1939, becoming Director of Public Relations (Air Ministry) in 1944. He was appointed a Companion of the Most Distinguished Order of St Michael and St George on 1 January 1943.

Mr. Edward Twentyman
(Civil Service) A 57-year-old married man from Chatham, Kent, born at Bolton, Lancashire, educated at London University. Worked in the India Office from 1910 and as "Principal Assistant" at the Treasury in 1920.

Mr. Eric Robinson
(Civil Service) A 35-year-old married man from Southport, Lancashire, living in Bromley, Kent.

Squadron Leader Elisha Gaddis Plum RAFVR
(UK Air Liaison Mission) A 47-year-old married man resident in Chelsea, London, and Rumson, New Jersey, a US citizen working with the United Kingdom Air Liaison Mission. Gaddis Plum joined the RAFVR and was commissioned on 1 June 1940 as a Pilot Officer in the "Equipment Branch", he was promoted Flight Lieutenant on 11 June 1943 and acting Squadron Leader
