= 1939 Hythe by-election =

1939 UK parliamentary by-election

← 1935	20 July 1939	1945 →

Constituency of Hythe
- Turnout: 62.4% (▼5.9%)
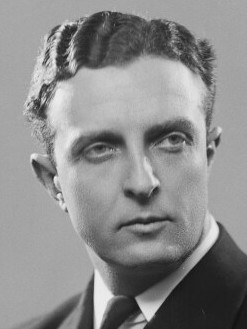
	First party	Second party
		Lib
Candidate	Rupert Brabner	Frank Ongley Darvall
Party	Conservative	Liberal
Popular vote	12,016	9,577
Percentage	54.2%	43.2%
Swing	▼9.7%	▲7.1%
MP before election
Philip Sassoon
Conservative
Elected MP
Rupert Brabner
Conservative

The 1939 Hythe by-election was a parliamentary by-election held on 20 July 1939 for the British House of Commons constituency of Hythe.

== Previous MP ==
The vacancy was caused by the death of the Conservative MP, Sir Philip Sassoon, 3rd Baronet.

== Previous result ==
General election, 14 November 1935 Electorate: 35,205
Party	Candidate	Votes	%	±%
Conservative	Philip Sassoon	15,359	63.9	−21.0
Liberal	Richard Hathaway Ellis	8,688	36.1	New
Majority		6,671	27.8	−42.0
Turnout		24,047	68.3	−3.5
Conservative hold		Swing		

== Candidates ==
- The Conservatives selected a London County Councillor, Rupert Brabner, to defend the seat.
- Hythe was not one of the Liberal Party's better prospects. They drafted a new candidate for the by-election: 33-year-old Frank Darvall, who had been selected as the prospective candidate for the more winnable Dorset East. He had been the Liberal candidate for the Ipswich Division of Suffolk at the 1929 general election and for the King's Lynn Division of Norfolk at the 1935 general election. He was President of the National Union of Students from 1927 to 1929.
- As in the 1935 general election campaign, the Hythe Labour Party chose not to run a candidate. However, a former Labour party member did contest the election: St John Philby stood as a candidate for the newly formed British People's Party, a right-wing anti-war party that broke away from the British Union of Fascists.

== Result ==
The Conservative Party held the seat with a reduced majority.

Hythe by-election, 1939 Electorate 35,535
Party	Candidate	Votes	%	±%
Conservative	Rupert Brabner	12,016	54.2	−9.7
Liberal	Frank Ongley Darvall	9,577	43.2	+7.1
British People's	St John Philby	576	2.6	New
Majority		2,439	11.0	−16.8
Turnout		22,169	62.4	−5.9
Conservative hold		Swing	-8.4	

== Aftermath ==
Rupert Brabner served as a junior Government Minister. He died on active service with the RNVR early in 1945. Frank Darvall had planned to contest Hythe at a 1939 or 1940 general election, but never stood for Parliament again. St. John Philby also disappeared from the electoral scene along with the British People's Party, which never contested an election again.

General election, 5 July 1945 Electorate 23,575
Party	Candidate	Votes	%	±%
Conservative	Harry Mackeson	8,048	46.5	−7.7
Labour	David Graham Widdiscombe	6,091	35.2	New
Liberal	Arthur Dyke Beauchamp James	3,152	18.2	−25.0
Majority		1,957	11.3	+0.3
Turnout		17,291	73.3	+10.9
Conservative hold		Swing		
