= Rupert Brabner =

English politician and World War II flying ace

Commander Rupert Brabner DSO DSC MP
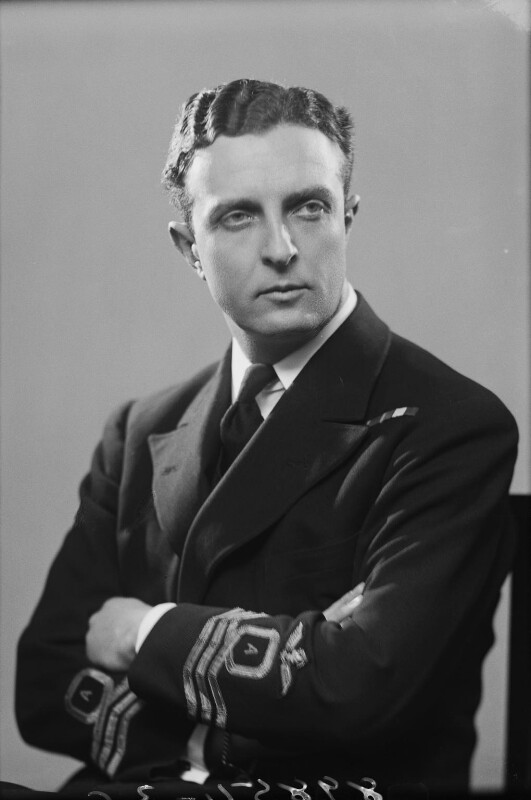
- Born: 29 October 1911; Epping, Essex, England
- Died: 27 March 1945 (aged 33) near Azores
- Military career
- Allegiance: United Kingdom
- Branch: Royal Navy
- Rank: Commander
- Commands: 801 Naval Air Squadron (1941–42)
- Conflicts: Second World War: Operation Harpoon; Operation Pedestal; Commando Liberator crash †
- Awards: Distinguished Service Order; Distinguished Service Cross
- Other work: Member of Parliament for Hythe (1939–45)

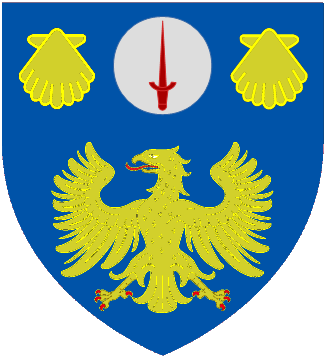
Arms depicted in the Commons chamber

Commander Rupert Arnold Brabner, DSO, DSC (29 October 1911 – 27 March 1945) was a British Member of Parliament (MP) who served as a Royal Navy officer and Fleet Air Arm pilot during the Second World War, achieving ace status with 5.5 confirmed kills.

== Politics ==
Brabner, from Loughton in Essex, was educated at Felsted School and St Catharine's College, Cambridge. By profession, he was a banker and a director of Singer & Friedlander Ltd.

Brabner became a member of London County Council for West Lewisham in 1937, and served until his death. He was elected to the House of Commons as the Conservative MP for Hythe in Kent on 20 July 1939, and was later appointed as a government whip. He was appointed to be Joint Parliamentary Under-Secretary of State for Air in 1944.

He and his sister Jean Gwenneth (also killed in World War II) are commemorated by a blue plaque on the family home at Loughton. His sister was a surgeon at St. Giles Hospital who was killed in a German V-1 rocket attack on London.

== War service ==
Brabner served as an officer of the Royal Naval Volunteer Reserve during the Second World War as a Fleet Air Arm pilot. He served with 806 Squadron (November 1940 and March 1941), 805 (early 1941) and 801 on HMS Illustrious (aircraft carrier), HMS Heron (RN Air Station, Yeovilton, Somerset), HMS Eagle (aircraft carrier), HMS Victorious (aircraft carrier), HMS Indomitable (aircraft carrier) and in Crete and North Africa.

From 11 August 1941 to September 1942, Brabner was the commanding officer of 801 Squadron serving aboard Eagle, which was sunk on 11 August 1942. He was awarded the Distinguished Service Order for his actions during Operation Harpoon. After surviving the loss of the Eagle, he was appointed to the staff of Rear Admiral Clement Moody, in regard to aircraft carriers for landings in North Africa. In 1943, Brabner was made naval assistant (technical) to the 5th Sea Lord. For his actions in August 1943 during Operation Pedestal, he was awarded the Distinguished Service Cross.

Brabner was an air ace with five confirmed destroyed enemy aircraft, one shared destroyed, and one probable.

Commander Brabner died age 33 when the Liberator aircraft taking him to Canada with Air Marshal Peter Drummond was lost off the Azores. He is commemorated on the Lee-on-Solent Memorial on bay 6, panel 2

Parliament of the United Kingdom
Preceded by Philip Sassoon	Member of Parliament for Hythe; 1939–1945	Succeeded by Harry Mackeson
Political offices
Preceded by The Lord Sherwood	Under-Secretary of State for Air; 1944–1945	Succeeded by John Strachey
