= Peter Drummond (RAF officer) =

Royal Air Force senior commander

Sir Peter Roy Maxwell Drummond
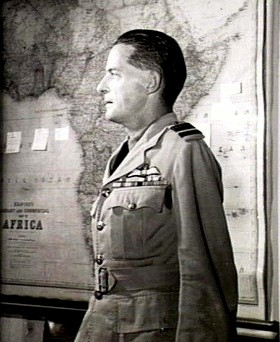
- Air Vice-Marshal Drummond in the Middle East, 1940
- Born: 2 June 1894; Perth, Western Australia
- Died: 27 March 1945 (aged 50); Azores
- Military career
- Allegiance: Australia; United Kingdom
- Service/branch: Royal Air Force
- Service years: 1914–45
- Rank: Air Marshal
- Unit: No. 1 Squadron AFC (1917)
- Commands: No. 145 Squadron RAF (1918–19); No. 111 Squadron RAF (1919); RAF Tangmere (1931–33); RAF Northolt (1936–37); Air Member for Training (1943–45)
- Conflicts: World War I; Gallipoli campaign; Sinai and Palestine campaign; World War II; Middle East theatre
- Awards: Knight Commander of the Order of the Bath; Distinguished Service Order & Bar; Officer of the Order of the British Empire; Military Cross; Mentioned in Despatches (3); Commander of the Order of the Phoenix (Greece)

Air Marshal Sir Peter Roy Maxwell Drummond, KCB, DSO & Bar, OBE, MC (2 June 1894 – 27 March 1945) was an Australian-born senior commander in the Royal Air Force (RAF). He rose from private soldier in World War I to air marshal in World War II. Drummond enlisted in the Australian Imperial Force in 1914 and the following year saw service as a medical orderly during the Gallipoli campaign. He joined the Royal Flying Corps in 1916 and became a fighter ace in the Middle Eastern theatre, where he was awarded the Military Cross and the Distinguished Service Order and Bar. Transferring to the RAF on its formation in 1918, he remained in the British armed forces for the rest of his life.

Between the wars, Drummond saw action in the Sudan—earning appointment as an Officer of the Order of the British Empire—and was posted to Australia on secondment to the Royal Australian Air Force (RAAF) as Director of Operations and Intelligence. In Britain, he commanded RAF stations Tangmere and Northolt. Ranked air commodore at the outbreak of World War II, he was Air Marshal Sir Arthur Tedder's Deputy Air Officer Commanding-in-Chief RAF Middle East from 1941 to 1943. Drummond was appointed a Companion of the Order of the Bath in 1941 for his services in the Middle East, and knighted in the same order two years later. He was twice offered command of the RAAF during the war but the RAF was unwilling to release him to take up the position. Britain's Air Member for Training from 1943, Drummond was killed in a plane crash at sea in 1945.

== Early life ==
Drummond was born on 2 June 1894 in Perth, Western Australia, to merchant John Maxwell Drummond and his wife Caroline (née Lockhart). Registered as Roy Maxwell Drummond, he acquired the nickname "Peter" during his schooling at Scotch College, and formally adopted it as his first name in 1943. He served in the cadets and worked as a bank clerk before enlisting in the Australian Imperial Force on 10 September 1914.

== World War I ==
=== Soldier and pilot ===
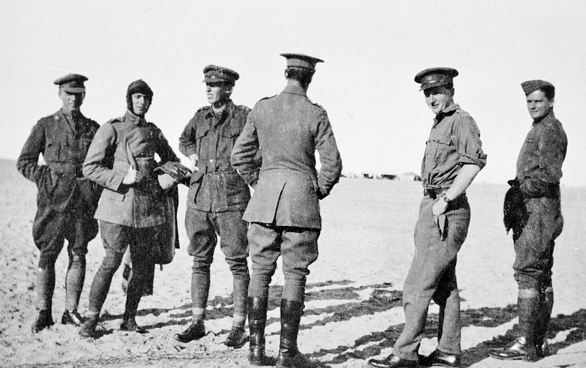
Lieutenant Drummond (far right) with Captain Ross Macpherson Smith (far left), Major Lawrence Wackett (third left), and other officers of No. 1 Squadron AFC, c. 1916

At 5 ft 7in (171 cm) in height, Drummond was judged too slight of build for the infantry and was instead assigned to the 2nd Stationary Hospital of the Australian Army Medical Corps as an orderly. By December 1914, when his unit sailed for Egypt, he was ranked corporal. He was sent to Gallipoli in April 1915 and served on a hospital ship, assisting surgeons in operations on the wounded. Drummond was evacuated to England later that year, suffering from dysentery. In December, he applied for a transfer to the British Royal Flying Corps (RFC) and was discharged from the Australian Army in April 1916.

Following pilot training in the United Kingdom, Drummond received the rank of temporary second lieutenant and was posted to Egypt, where he was assigned to No. 1 Squadron, Australian Flying Corps (numbered 67 Squadron RFC by the British). During the Sinai and Palestine campaign, he took part in the air assaults that preceded the Battle of Magdhaba on 23 December 1916. He later wrote, "The day before the Magdhaba battle, the whole crowd of us with all the bombs we could carry, went out. You couldn't see the place for smoke after we had left ... The Turks were retreating all the time and we had great sport coming down to about 50 feet and peppering them with machine guns ..." On 20 March 1917, Drummond, flying a Royal Aircraft Factory B.E.2, was one of two pilots who strafed enemy troops threatening Lieutenant Frank McNamara as he rescued a downed Australian airman, the action for which McNamara was awarded his Victoria Cross.

=== Flight commander and ace ===
Drummond was awarded the Military Cross for "conspicuous gallantry and devotion to duty" on 20 April 1917, when he and Lieutenant Adrian Cole engaged and drove off six enemy aircraft that were attempting to bomb Allied cavalry; the award was promulgated in The London Gazette on 16 August. Drummond was promoted to temporary lieutenant on 1 May 1917. Later that month he was appointed a flight commander in No. 1 Squadron, with the temporary rank of captain. He joined No. 111 Squadron RFC as a flight commander and temporary captain in October. On 12 December, he and his observer were escorting two Australian aircraft in a Bristol Fighter near Tul Karem, Palestine, when they were spotted by three German Albatros scouts. Drummond attacked and destroyed all three of the enemy aircraft. This achievement earned him the Distinguished Service Order for his "great skill and daring"; the award was promulgated on 26 March 1918.

On 27 March 1918, again near Tul Karem, Drummond and another pilot scrambled to attack a German scout. As his wingman dealt with the intruder, Drummond, flying a Nieuport, single-handedly engaged six other German aircraft that had suddenly appeared. According to his own account, after he had destroyed one and "sent another down in a spin", Drummond developed engine trouble and had to land behind enemy lines. Finding his engine firing again, he took off before he could be captured by Turkish troops and gained a start over the four still-circling German scouts, "who had also concluded that the fight was over". He was forced to land three more times in enemy territory—once in a cavalry camp where he "carried away a line full of washing" with his undercarriage in his escape—before he shook off all but one of the pursuing fighters and landed safely behind Allied lines. He was awarded a Bar to his DSO on 26 July for his "gallant and successful" actions.

The RFC merged with the Royal Naval Air Service to form the Royal Air Force (RAF) on 1 April 1918. Drummond was given command of No. 145 Squadron RAF, which operated Royal Aircraft Factory S.E.5 fighters, in July 1918, and was made an acting major on 2 September. He finished the war an ace, credited with eight victories, and was mentioned in despatches on 5 June 1919.

== Inter-war years ==
Drummond remained in the RAF following World War I, holding command of No. 111 Squadron in 1919, and receiving his permanent commission as an acting captain on 1 August that year. He was based in the Sudan from January to July 1920, as part of Britain's system of "control without occupation", using aircraft instead of armies to put down local rebellions. As acting squadron leader, Drummond commanded "H" Unit, the entire complement of which consisted of two aircraft. Returning to Britain, he was appointed an Officer of the Order of the British Empire on 22 July 1921 in recognition of his "excellent work" in the face of "adverse conditions", conducting a successful reconnaissance and bombing campaign against Garjak Nuer tribesmen. He entered RAF Staff College, Andover, in 1922.

On 1 January 1923, Drummond was promoted to squadron leader; he graduated from Andover the same year. Also in 1923, he proposed an officer exchange scheme for the RAF and the newly formed Royal Australian Air Force (RAAF). Following a staff posting to the Air Ministry, he was seconded to the RAAF in 1925, serving four years as Director of Operations and Intelligence at Air Force Headquarters, Melbourne. He married Isabel Drake-Brockman, cousin of Brigadier General Edmund Drake-Brockman, at St John's Anglican Church in Toorak, Victoria, on 17 July 1929; the couple had a son and two daughters. Drummond returned to the UK in November that year. He studied at the Imperial Defence College, London, in 1930, and was promoted wing commander on 1 July 1931. From November 1931 to June 1933, he commanded RAF Tangmere, a fighter base. After Tangmere, Drummond spent three years at the Air Ministry. In September 1936 he assumed command of RAF Northolt. While in charge of Northolt he was promoted to group captain on 1 January 1937. That November, Drummond was appointed senior air staff officer (SASO) at RAF Middle East in Cairo. He was raised to air commodore on 1 July 1939.

== World War II ==
=== Deputy Air Officer Commanding-in-Chief Middle East ===
At the outbreak of World War II, Drummond was still SASO RAF Middle East. In early 1940 he became involved in preparations for Operation Pike, an Anglo-French plan to bomb oil fields in the Caucasus; the Soviet Union was at this time seen as allied to Nazi Germany, in the wake of the invasion of Poland and the Winter War. Drummond led a delegation to Aleppo, Syria, to discuss Turkey's defence again possible German or Russian attack. He planned to operate British aircraft out of French bases in northern Syria if Pike went ahead. Drummond was made an acting air vice-marshal on 19 June 1940, and temporary air vice-marshal on 10 January the next year. On 1 June 1941, he was raised to acting air marshal and appointed Deputy Air Officer Commanding-in-Chief (AOC-in-C) RAF Middle East, following Air Marshal Sir Arthur Tedder's elevation to AOC-in-C. The Australian Dictionary of Biography credits Tedder and Drummond with developing their command as "a mobile strike-force capable of co-operating fully with the other two services", and Tedder later remarked on the importance of his deputy's contribution to the Allied victory in North Africa. Tedder's biographer, Vincent Orange, contended that "Tedder's growing eminence ... owes a great deal to Drummond's wise and dedicated support".

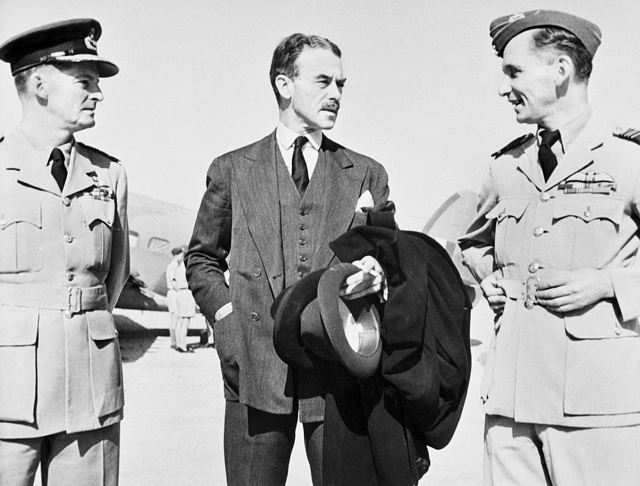
Air Vice-Marshal Drummond (left) with British Minister of State of the Middle East Richard Casey (centre) and Air Marshal Sir Arthur Tedder (right) in May 1942

Drummond considered the Middle East a "Battle for Airfields", as whichever side held the Mediterranean landing grounds could protect its shipping at the expense of the enemy's. Admiral Sir Andrew Cunningham found Drummond "a thorough non-cooperator" but Drummond's assistant, Arthur Lee, described him as "a refreshing man to work with ... without pose or frills, serious, but with a sense of humour nearly as irreverent and sarcastic as Tedder's". Drummond was appointed a Companion of the Order of the Bath on 24 September 1941 "in recognition of distinguished services rendered in operational commands of the Royal Air Force" from 1 October 1940 to 31 March 1941. His temporary rank of air vice-marshal was made substantive on 14 April 1942.

In early 1942 the Australian government sought Drummond for the position of Chief of the Air Staff (CAS) of the RAAF, to succeed Air Chief Marshal Sir Charles Burnett, RAF, at the completion of the latter's two-year term. Australia's High Commissioner to the United Kingdom, Stanley Bruce, had recommended Drummond in a cable to Prime Minister John Curtin on 5 February. Although the British government was initially supportive of the plan, the Air Ministry eventually declined to release Drummond from his role in the Middle East, partly to avoid disruption to the region's command and also because it did not believe that Drummond's operational abilities would be put to sufficient use in the largely administrative role of CAS. Drummond himself was reportedly dubious about the appointment because of the division of authority between RAAF Headquarters and Allied Air Force Headquarters, South West Pacific Area (SWPA).

Burnett had recommended his deputy, Air Vice-Marshal William Bostock, for CAS but in May 1942 the position went to acting Air Commodore George Jones. Bostock in turn became Air Officer Commanding RAAF Command, Australia's main operational organisation under SWPA. An ongoing conflict between Jones (now promoted air vice-marshal) and Bostock led to moves in April 1943 to bring in an officer senior to both men to head the RAAF in a unified command structure, and Drummond was once more approached by the Australian government. Drummond had indicated that he was happy to serve in Australia but the Air Ministry again refused to release him, having selected him for a seat on the Air Council as Air Member for Training.

=== Final posting and loss at sea ===
Unfinished sketch of Drummond by Cuthbert Orde, August 1945

Drummond succeeded Air Marshal Sir Guy Garrod as Air Member for Training on 27 April 1943. He was raised to temporary air marshal on 1 June 1943, and appointed a Knight Commander of the Order of the Bath in the King's Birthday Honours the following day. Drummond's position on the Air Council included administering the Empire Air Training Scheme, making him partly responsible for the serious oversupply of aircrew that was apparent by 1944; Drummond believed that the situation would be counteracted only if the upcoming invasion of Europe led to heavy casualties. He remained an advocate of close cooperation between the RAF and Dominion air forces; the Adelaide Advertiser quoted him as saying, "Daily journeying to my London office ... I make a point of passing the Boomerang Club at Australia House just for the pleasure and gratification of swapping a salute and a 'good day' with some of the best air crew in the world—the RAAF."

On 27 March 1945, Drummond was en route to Canada with other dignitaries to attend a ceremony marking the closure of the Empire Air Training Scheme. His plane, a B-24 Liberator nicknamed Commando that was formerly the personal transport of Winston Churchill, disappeared near the Azores and all aboard were presumed killed. Frank McNamara, now an RAAF air vice-marshal based in England and a close friend, broke the news to Drummond's widow. Air Marshal Sir Roderic Hill succeeded Drummond as Air Member for Training.

Drummond was survived by his wife and three children. A memorial service for the victims of the Azores flight was held at St Martin-in-the-Fields on 8 May 1945. Drummond was twice mentioned in despatches for his service in World War II, on 11 June 1942, and on 19 September 1946 (for his performance as SASO RAF Middle East in 1940–41). On 3 May 1946, he was posthumously granted permission to wear the award of Commander of the Order of the Phoenix, conferred by the Kingdom of Greece. Tedder wrote in 1948 that Drummond as Deputy AOC-in-C Middle East "bore so much of the burden and took so little of the credit"; Vincent Orange observed that the two commanders remained friends and that Drummond "might well have succeeded Tedder as Chief of the Air Staff" but for his early death. He is commemorated on Panel 264 of the Runnymede Memorial in Surrey.

== Notes ==
Military offices
Preceded by Sir Guy Garrod	Air Member for Training; 1943–1945	Succeeded by Sir Roderic Hill
