= Harold B. Hoskins =

Lebanon-born American businessman and diplomat (1895–1977)

Harold Boies Hoskins (1895-1977) was an American businessman, diplomat and expert on the Middle East.

== Life ==
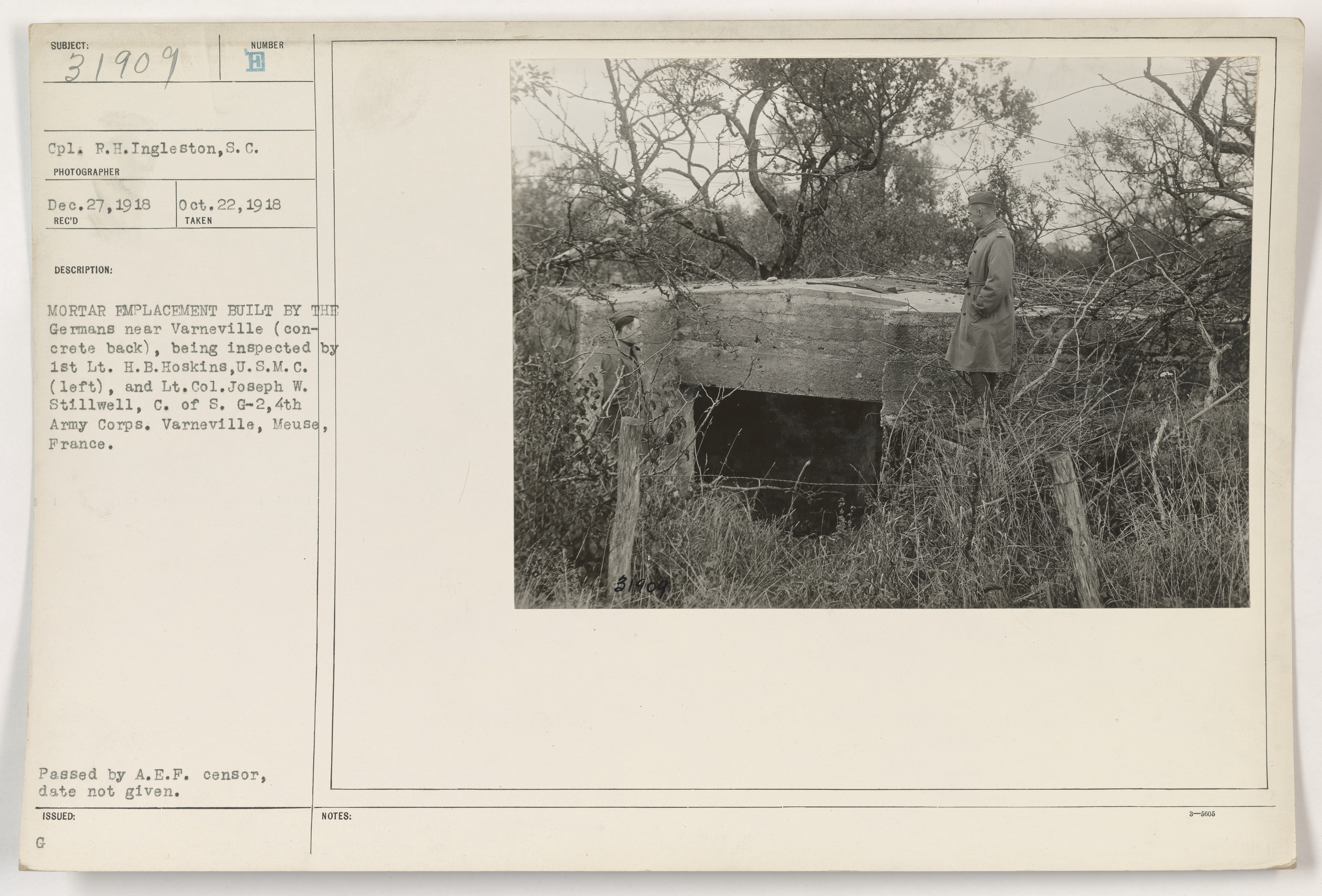
H. B. Hoskins in 1918

Harold Hoskins was born in Beirut, the son of American missionaries to Syria (at the time Syria was a province of the Ottoman Empire, and the term included all modern Syria, Lebanon, Israel, Palestine, Jordan, and some small areas that are currently within the boundaries of Turkey). He graduated from the Hill School in 1913 and from Princeton University in 1917. During World War I he served as an officer in the 5th Marine Regiment, and was awarded the Croix de Guerre with palm.

A textile executive, Hopkins joined the Office of Strategic Services during World War II. A friend of both Franklin D. Roosevelt and Sumner Welles, Hopkins was sent to Cairo in 1942 to appraise the situation in the Middle East. His April 1943 report advocated "no final decisions" on Palestine until after the war had ended. His longer-term recommendation was for a bi-national Arab-Jewish state, within the context of a wider Levant Federation.

Hopkins was a consultant for Exxon in the 1940s, and a contract employee of the CIA in the early 1950s. From 1955 to 1961 he was Director of the Foreign Service Institute. He was also chairman of the board of trustees of the American University of Beirut.

His papers are held at Princeton University.
