= The Warren =

- Warren House
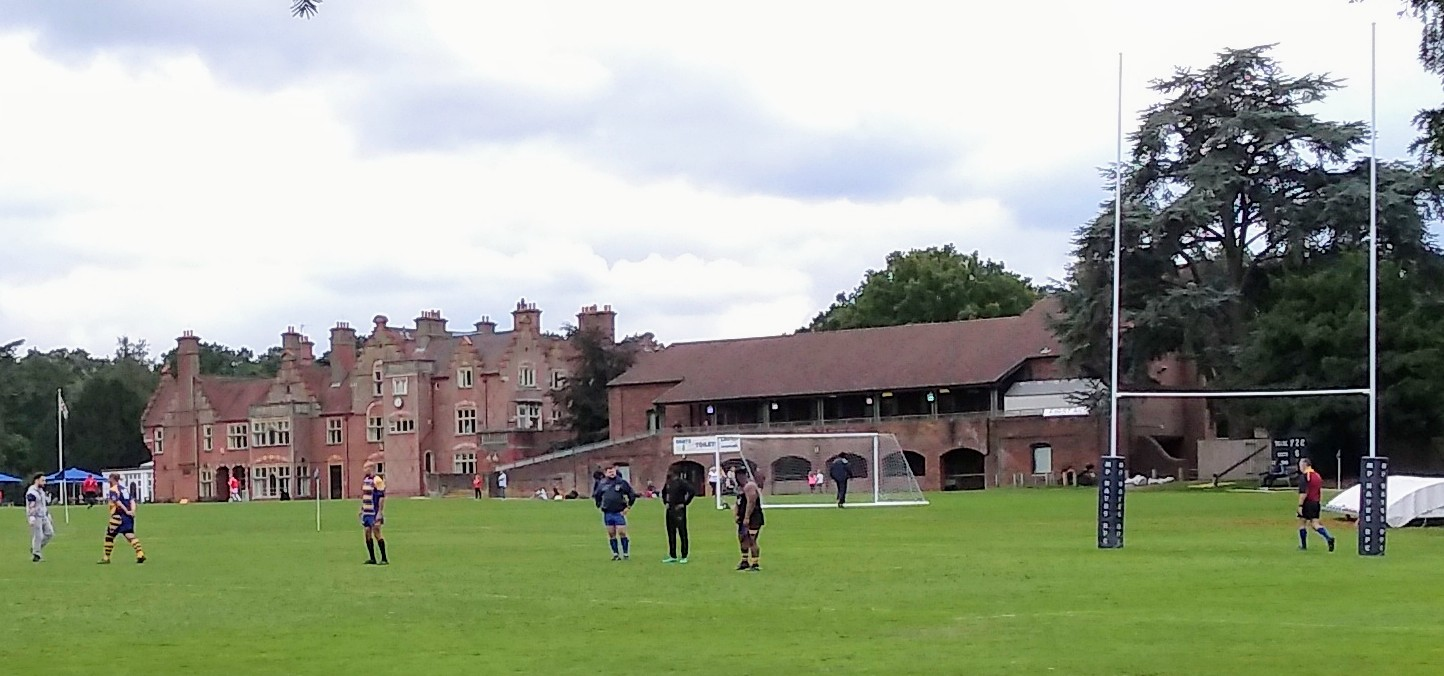
- Interactive map of The Warren
- Coordinates: 51°22′14″N 0°0′30″E

Listed Building – Grade II
- Official name: The Warren
- Designated: 29 June 1973
- Reference no.: 1064351

The Warren, originally known as Warren House, is a Grade II listed building located in the parish of West Wickham and the postal district of Hayes, Greater London, England. Built in 1882 by Walter Maximilian de Zoete, the manor house is known for its distinctive Flemish style architecture, its connection to influential individuals, and its notable use during World War I as an auxiliary hospital.

== Architecture ==
The Warren is a red brick mansion designed in the Flemish style, specifically noted for its stepped gables, a style not commonly found in England. This architectural influence is reminiscent of the old Flemish school and is noticeable in its decorated gables and characteristic window heads. The house consists of two floors, in addition to a red brick attic, with irregular mullioned and transom windows. A prominent feature of the building is the large central brick porch adorned with a stone balustrade above.

When put up for sale in 1909, the brochure prepared by John D. Wood & Co. estate agents boasted interior feature walls panelled in teak, a national telephone line, a burglar alarm system for the ground floor and an electric plant building producing 100 ampere 150 volt current for lighting the mansion and other buildings on the estate. At the time the estate spanned 12 ½ acres and included a thatched-roof brick summer cottage supplied with gas and water, stables, a carpentry shop, various greenhouses and hot houses, a mushroom house, a motor garage, tennis courts and various other buildings. The landscaped property was described as consisting of beautiful grounds featuring a rich collection of trees and shrubs, a rose garden, herbaceous beds, a 1-acre walled kitchen garden, grass paths and gravelled walks as well as wilderness spaces.

== History ==
=== Early history ===
The land where The Warren was to be built belonged to the Wickham Court Estate. It had been enclosed before the Metropolitan Commons Act 1866 and no one could claim its restitution.

In 1882 it was leased by Julia Maria Francis Lennard, wife of Colonel Sir John Farnaby Lennard, a local landowner, for ninety-nine years at £60 per annum to Walter Maximilian de Zoete, son of the banker Samuel Herman de Zoete, who became Chairman of the Stock exchange in 1872.

Walter Maximillian de Zoete built Warren House, the name derived from the wooded area on the west side of the house known locally as The Warren because it was over-run with rabbits.

In 1885 leasehold interests were assigned to Martin R Smith, a well-known banker from Lombard Street. An additional 16 acres of enclosed land was leased to Smith from Sir John Farnaby Lennard for 93 years at £320 per annum.

Smith further extended Warren House by adding a billiard room, a new wing, a pair of cottages, a summer house, and a range of glasshouses. He was an avid gardener, particularly renowned for his work with carnations, employing up to 18 gardeners and becoming one of the leading growers of the carnation hybrid.

In 1909, after the death of Martin Smith, Warren House was sold to Sir Robert Laidlaw, a member of parliament for Renfrewshire and a founder of Whiteway Laidlaw department store in Calcutta, India, for £15,000.

At the onset of World War I in 1914, Sir Robert generously offered Warren House to the British Red Cross Society for use as a 50-bed hospital. He also contributed £25 a week towards its upkeep and provided produce from his gardens. The Warren Auxiliary Hospital opened on 14 October 1914 with 55 beds for enlisted servicemen. The first patients to arrive on the opening day were a party of sick and wounded Belgian soldiers. The nursing staff consisted of a Matron and 2 Sisters, with members of the Kent/82 It remained operational until 28 May 1926, treating over 630 servicemen during its lifetime.

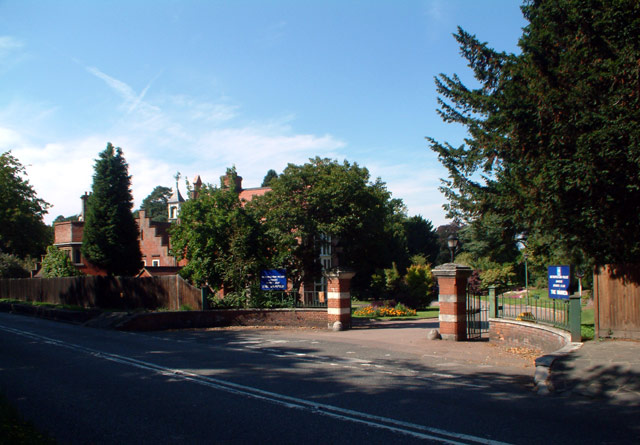
The Warren – Metropolitan Police Sports Club. 2005.

=== Later Ownership and Current Use ===
Following Sir Robert's death in 1915, the mansion was sold in 1920 to Edwin Mumford Preston, a Councillor for Deptford for the Progressive Party and later for the Municipal Reform Party, for £19,500.

Preston had a keen interest in flowering shrubs and rare plants, and contributed greatly to the community, leading to a Preston Road in Hayes being named after him. He and Mrs Preston also donated land for the construction of the Hayes Village Hall. It was during Preston's ownership that the name was changed from Warren House to The Warren.

In 1934, Gordon Ralph Hall-Caine, MP of Woolley Firs, Maidenhead, briefly owned The Warren but he never took up residence, before it was purchased by the Receiver through the offices of Lady Margetson, wife of Major Sir Philip Margetson, the Deputy commissioner of the Metropolitan Police, for use by the Metropolitan Police as a sports club.

Following extensive conversion work, The Warren officially opened as the Club House and sports grounds on 13 June 1935, inaugurated by Marshal of the Royal Air Force, Lord Trenchard, Commissioner of Police of the Metropolis.

During World War II, the stables were used as headquarters for the local Home Guard, and the Club became a favorite rendezvous for pilots such as 'Sailor' Malan, Stanford Tuck, Jamie Rankin, Al Deere, Don Kingaby and E. H. Thomas, from nearby Biggin Hill Airport.

In 1974, major construction work was undertaken on the stables to open a new Metropolitan Police Horse Patrol Station. This added a block in the mirror image of the existing Dutch-style building. The stables remained operational until 1997 due to a reorganisation of the Service.

Today, The Warren serves as a sports and social club for members and retirees of the Metropolitan Police Service, as well as for the local community.
