= Lennard baronets of West Wickham (2nd creation, 1880) =

Escutcheon of the Lennard baronets of Wickham Court, second creation

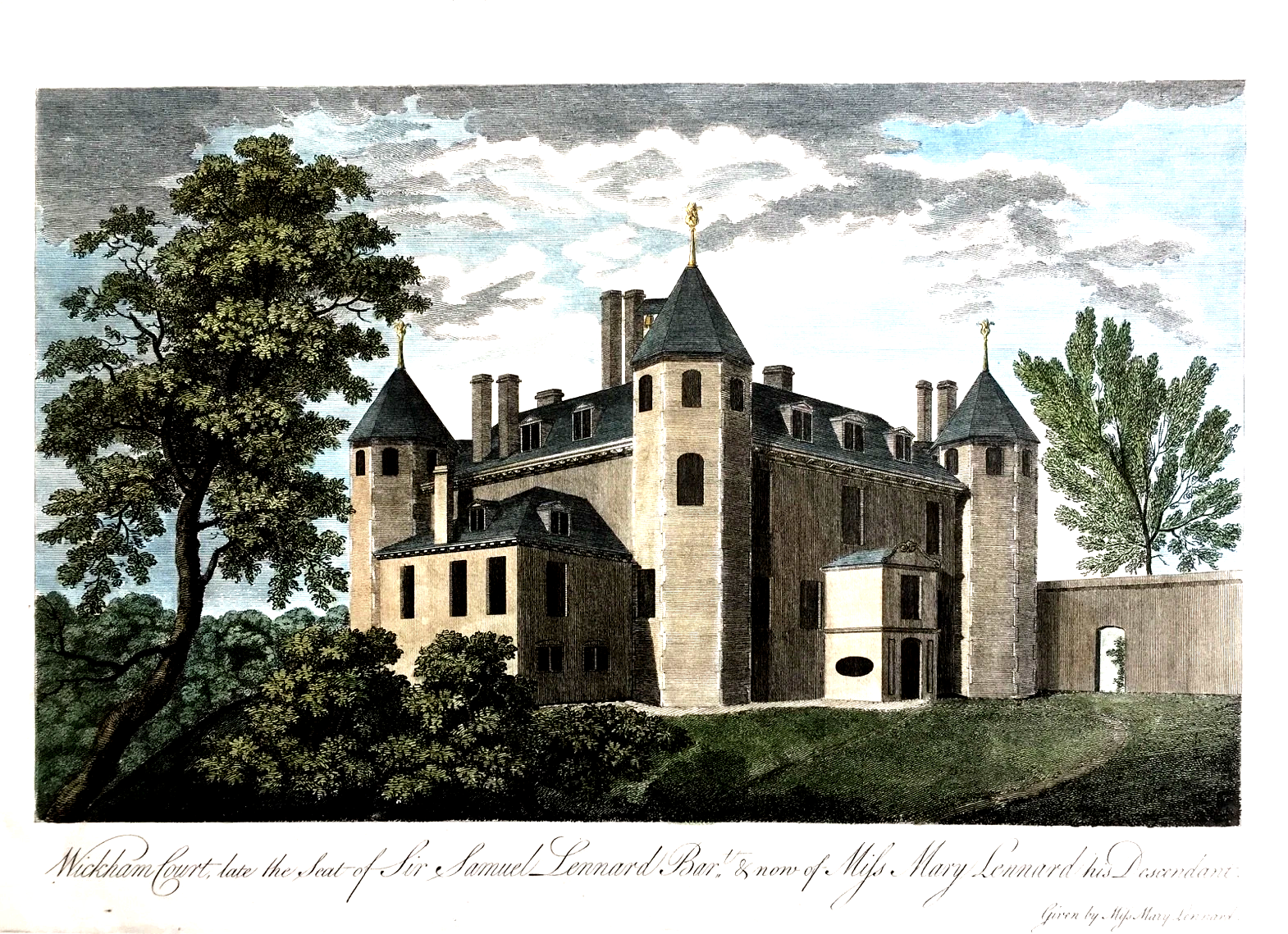
West Wickham Court, engraving from 1780 when Mary Lennard resided there

The Lennard baronetcy, of Wickham Court in the County of Kent, was created in the Baronetage of the United Kingdom on 6 May 1880 for Col. John Farnaby Lennard (formerly Cator). He was the son of Gen. Sir William Cator and his first wife Penelope Anne Farnaby, daughter of Sir John Farnaby, 4th Baronet, and nephew of Sir Albemarle Bertie, 1st Baronet. Under the will of Sir Charles Francis Farnaby, 5th Baronet, who died in 1859, whose mother Mary was the daughter of Stephen Lennard, an illegitimate son of Sir Samuel Lennard, 3rd Baronet of the first creation, he took the surname Lennard to inherit property.

The title became extinct on the death of the 3rd Baronet in 1980.

== Lennard baronets, of Wickham Court (1880) ==
- Sir John Farnaby Lennard, 1st Baronet (1816–1899)
- Sir Henry Arthur Hallam Farnaby Lennard, 2nd Baronet (1859–1928)
- Sir Stephen Arthur Hallam Farnaby Lennard, 3rd Baronet (1899–1980), left no heir.

== Notes ==
Baronetage of the United Kingdom
Preceded by Meyrick baronets	Lennard baronets of West Wickham; 6 May 1880	Succeeded by Allsopp baronets
