= St John Rigby College =

St John Rigby College may refer to:

- St John Rigby College, Wigan, Wigan, England
- All Saints Catholic School, West Wickham - formerly known as such but then renamed
