= Christopher Hall =

Christopher Hall may refer to:

== People ==
needs valid blue link

- Christopher Newman Hall (1816–1902), English clergyman
- Christopher Hall (sculptor) (born 1942), British sculptor
- Christopher Hall (musician) (born 1965), American musician and vocalist
- Christopher Hall (producer) (born 1957), British TV drama producer
- Christopher Hall (theologian) (born 1950), American Episcopal theologian
- Christopher Hall (cricketer) (born 1977), former English cricketer
- Christopher Hall (Big Brother), British Big Brother contestant

== Places ==
- Christopher Hall Island, Nunavut, Canada

== See also ==
- Chris Hall (disambiguation)
