= Meyrick baronets =

Baronetcy in the Baronetage of the United Kingdom

Meyrick escutcheon, Meyrick quartering

The Meyrick baronetcy, of Bush House in the parish of St Mary in the County of Pembroke and of Apley Castle in the parish of Wellington in the County of Salop, is a title in the Baronetage of the United Kingdom. It was created on 5 May 1880 for Thomas Meyrick, Conservative Member of Parliament for Pembroke from 1868 to 1874. Born Thomas Charlton, he had assumed by royal licence the surname of Meyrick (which was that of his maternal grandfather) in lieu of his patronymic in 1858.

The Official Roll of the Baronetage marks the title "dormant". The family surname is pronounced "Merrick".

== Meyrick baronets, of Bush House and of Apley Castle (1880) ==
- Sir Thomas Charlton Meyrick, 1st Baronet (1837–1921)
- Sir Frederick Charlton Meyrick, 2nd Baronet (1862–1932)
- Sir Thomas Frederick Meyrick, 3rd Baronet (1899–1983)
- Sir David John Charlton Meyrick, 4th Baronet (1926–2004)
- Timothy Thomas Charlton Meyrick, presumed 5th Baronet (born 1963). He does not use the title.

The heir presumptive is the present holder's brother, Simon Edward Meyrick (born 1965).

== See also ==
- Tapps-Gervis-Meyrick baronets

== Notes ==
Baronetage of the United Kingdom
Preceded by Campbell baronets	Meyrick baronets of Bush House and Apley Castle; 5 May 1880	Succeeded by Lennard baronets
