= John Meyrick (rower) =

British agriculturalist and rower (1926–2004)

Olympic medal record

Men's rowing

Representing Great Britain
Silver medal – second place	1948 London	Eight

Sir David John Charlton Meyrick, 4th Baronet (2 December 1926 – 6 February 2004) was a British agriculturalist and rower who competed for Great Britain in the 1948 Summer Olympics.

Meyrick was born in Towcester, Northamptonshire, the eldest son of Colonel Sir Thomas Meyrick, 3rd Baronet, and his wife Ivy (née Pilkington). He was educated at Eton, where he was an excellent rower, and at Trinity Hall, Cambridge. He rowed for Trinity Hall in the Head of the River race. In 1947 and 1948, he was a member of the victorious Cambridge crews in the Boat Races. Most of the Cambridge crew of 1948 also rowed for Leander Club and Meyrick stroked the eight at Henley Royal Regatta. The Leander eight were selected to row for Great Britain in the 1948 Summer Olympics and won the silver medal.

After university, Meyrick became resident land agent on the Earl of Coventry's Croome Estate in Worcestershire. Seven years later he moved to Pembrokeshire and began farming. The family had lived in Pembrokeshire since the 16th century. He succeeded in the baronetcy on the death of his father in 1983 and inherited the family home at Gumfreston. He was on the Council of the Royal Agricultural Society, as the South Wales representative, a steward at the Royal Show at Stoneleigh, and a member of the National Farmers Union where he sat on its milk committee. He was also a member of the Country Landowners' and Rural Business Association in Pembrokeshire.

Meyrick suffered a stroke at the age of 60 and died at Pembroke at the age of 77.

== See also ==
- List of Cambridge University Boat Race crews
- Rowing at the 1948 Summer Olympics

Baronetage of the United Kingdom
Preceded by Thomas Meyrick	Baronet (of Bush); 1983–2004	Succeeded by Timothy Meyrick
