= Noviomagus Cantiacorum =

Roman settlement in southeastern Britain

Coordinates: 51.4526°N 0.1788°E

Noviomagus is a Latinization of a Brittonic placename meaning "new plain" or "new fields", a clearing in woodland. The element Cantiacorum (Latin for "of the Cantiaci") is a modern coinage that distinguishes it from other places with the name Noviomagus. It was a Roman settlement in southeastern Britain, named on Iter II of the Antonine Itinerary, ten Roman miles from Londinium and nineteen to Vagniacis, thence nine miles to Durobrivae. Its location has been given as modern Crayford, but is now suggested to be near West Wickham following excavation of the Roman site there; the distances also fit West Wickham better than Crayford.

Thousands of sherds of pottery and hundreds of Roman coins have been found near West Wickham in Kent, but only slight evidence of housing. The main activity at the site in the Roman period may have been trading in an open-air market, rather than settlement.

== See also ==
- Noviomagus Reginorum in Chichester
