= Kent Militia Artillery =

Auxiliary unit of the British Army

Kent Militia Artillery 2nd Brigade, Cinque Ports Division, RA Kent Artillery (Eastern Division) RA Kent Royal Garrison Artillery (M)
- Active: 1798–1815; 1853–1909
- Country: United Kingdom
- Branch: Militia
- Role: Garrison Artillery
- Part of: Cinque Ports Division, RA (1882–89); Eastern Division, RA (1889–1902)
- Garrison/HQ: Dover

The Kent Militia Artillery was a part-time reserve unit of Britain's Royal Artillery based at Dover in Kent, from 1853 to 1909.

== Background ==
The long-standing national Militia of Great Britain was greatly expanded during the French Revolutionary Wars, and one of the new regiments was an artillery unit in the county of Kent, raised at Dover in 1798. It was embodied for full-time service from 1803 to 1815 during the Napoleonic Wars. Thereafter it disappeared from the Army List.

The militia was revived by the Militia Act 1852, enacted during a period of international tension. As before, units were raised and administered on a county basis, and filled by voluntary enlistment (although conscription by means of the Militia Ballot might be used if the counties failed to meet their quotas). Training was for 56 days on enlistment, then for 21–28 days per year, during which the men received full army pay. Under the Act, Militia units could be embodied by Royal Proclamation for full-time home defence service in three circumstances:

1. 'Whenever a state of war exists between Her Majesty and any foreign power'.
2. 'In all cases of invasion or upon imminent danger thereof'.
3. 'In all cases of rebellion or insurrection'.

The 1852 Act introduced a number of Militia Artillery units in addition to the traditional infantry regiments. Their role was to man coastal defences and fortifications, relieving the Royal Artillery (RA) for active service.

== History ==
The unit was raised in Kent in May 1853 with six batteries under the title of Kent Militia Artillery with headquarters at Dover. The colonel was John Townshend, 3rd Viscount Sydney and the first Lieutenant-Colonel Commandant was John Farnaby Cator, a Half-pay Captain in the Royal Artillery, who in 1861 changed his surname to Lennard. Much later he was created a Baronet and in 1889 was the first Chairman of Kent County Council.

Several of the other early officers were half-pay or retired officers of the Royal Engineers or Brigade of Guards or were prominent personages in Kent, including Major the Hon. Charles Stewart Hardinge, MP, son of the Commander-in-Chief. Captain Walter G. Stirling, RA, (later 3rd Baronet) was appointed Lt-Col on 24 April 1876, having been the major since 5 December 1871.

Following the Cardwell Reforms a mobilisation scheme began to appear in the Army List from December 1875. This assigned places in an order of battle of the 'Garrison Army' to Militia Artillery units: the Kent Artillery's war station was at Dover, including Dover Castle, Drop Redoubt, the Western Heights and Breakwater batteries, and the forts and batteries from Dymchurch to Ramsgate.

The Artillery Militia was reorganised into 11 divisions of garrison artillery in 1882, and the Kent unit became the senior Militia unit in the new Cinque Ports Division, taking the title of 2nd Brigade, Cinque Ports Division, RA (the 1st Brigade comprised the Regular RA units of the division). When the Cinque Ports Division was abolished in 1889 its militia were transferred to the Eastern Division and the unit's title was altered to Kent Artillery (Eastern Division) RA.

From 1899 the Militia artillery formally became part of the Royal Garrison Artillery (RGA), and when the RGA abolished the divisional structure the Dover unit took the title of Kent RGA (M) on 1 January 1902.

== Embodiments ==
The unit was twice embodied for home defence:

- Crimean War: 3 January 1855 to 10 June 1856
- Second Boer War: 3 May to 13 October 1900

Although the Kent Artillery volunteered for overseas service during the Boer War, this offer was not accepted. However, two officers of the regiment did serve as individuals, and both were Mentioned in dispatches: Capt C.E. Schlesinger was attached to 8th Division Ammunition Column, and Capt R. De B. Hassell was attached to the Remount Department. On 8 December 1900 he was in charge of a train of remounts that was derailed and shelled between Kokomere and Klerkensdorp. Hassell personally uncoupled the engine and sent it for help while he and 11 others held off 100 attackers and saved the train.

== Disbandment ==
After the Boer War, the future of the Militia was called into question. There were moves to reform the Auxiliary Forces (Militia, Yeomanry and Volunteers) to take their place in the six Army Corps proposed by St John Brodrick as Secretary of State for War. Some batteries of Militia Artillery were to be converted to field artillery. However, little of Brodrick's scheme was carried out.

Under the sweeping Haldane Reforms of 1908, the Militia was replaced by the Special Reserve, a semi-professional force whose role was to provide reinforcement drafts for Regular units serving overseas in wartime. Although the majority of the officers and men of the Kent RGA (M) accepted transfer to the Special Reserve Royal Field Artillery, becoming the Kent Royal Field Reserve Artillery on 7 June 1908, all these units were disbanded in March 1909. Instead the men of the RFA Special Reserve would form Brigade Ammunition Columns for the Regular RFA brigades on the outbreak of war.

== Uniform and insignia ==
In 1853 the officers of the Kent Militia Artillery wore badges that were unique to the unit. Their black leather helmet carried a plate consisting of an ornate silver shield surmounted by a crown. The shield bore a gilt grenade, on the ball of which was the Royal 'VR' Cypher. Below the grenade were crossed gilt cannons. A separate silver scroll beneath the plate was inscribed 'KENT'. The officers' black leather pouch belt bore a white metal plate comprising a simple shield with the White horse of Kent stamped in the centre. Below the shield was a scroll inscribed with the Kent motto 'INVICTA', and either side of the shield was a spray of leaves. After 1882 the officers wore the standard gilt Cinque Ports Division helmet plate. An 1896 photographs shows that the Kent was one of the few artillery militia corps to issue all ranks with the standard British Army blue cloth helmet of the period.

== Colonels ==
- John Townshend, 3rd Viscount Sydney, later 1st Earl Sydney, was appointed Colonel of the Regiment on 4 May 1853 and held the position until his death in 1890.
- Sir William Stirling, 3rd Bt, former CO, was appointed Honorary Colonel on 8 March 1890 and held the post until its disbandment.
