= Sir John Farnaby Lennard, 1st Baronet =

British Army officer and Chairman of Kent County Council

Colonel Sir John Farnaby Lennard, 1st Baronet (27 September 1816 – 27 December 1899), of Wickham Court in Kent, was an English soldier and landowner who from 1889 until his death served as the first Chairman of Kent County Council. Until 1861 he was known as John Farnaby Cator.

== Early life ==
Born in 1816, John Farnaby Cator was the eldest son of William Cator, a Royal Regiment of Artillery officer, and his wife Penelope Anne, daughter of Sir John Farnaby, Baronet. He was educated at the Royal Military Academy, Woolwich, from where he was commissioned into the Royal Artillery.

His father rose to the rank of full General and in 1865 was appointed a Knight Commander of the Order of the Bath.

== Career ==
In 1837, Cator was promoted to First Lieutenant. In 1846, he was advanced to the rank of Second Captain, and in 1847 was appointed as Adjutant. In 1852, he was a half-pay Captain of the Royal Artillery and was commissioned as a Major into the West Kent Regiment of Militia. In 1853, the Lord Lieutenant of Kent, Earl Cowper, promoted him to Lieutenant Colonel Commandant of the Kent Militia Regiment of Artillery, a post he still held in November 1861.

In November 1861, Cator assumed by royal licence the name of Lennard, and also had permission to quarter the arms of Lennard with his own. The licence says that this was in accordance with an indenture of settlement dated 18 February 1852, which was the day before his second marriage.

In March 1866, Lennard was Chairman of the Quarter Sessions of the county of Kent.

Lennard owned about 4,900 acres, was a member of the Carlton Club, and lived at Wickham Court, West Wickham. On 6 May 1880, Lennard was created a baronet.

In 1889, Lennard was elected as the first Chairman of the new Kent County Council. He continued to serve in this position until his death and at the next quarterly meeting was succeeded by Mr. G. Marsham, with Mr Fiennes Cornwallis MP as Vice-Chairman.

== Private life ==
In 1847, as Cator, Lennard married firstly Laura Golding, and they had two daughters. She died in 1850.

On 19 February 1852, at St Paul's Church, Knightsbridge, he married secondly Julia Maria Frances Hallam, then living at 24, Wilton Crescent, daughter of Henry Hallam and sister of the poet Arthur Hallam; they had one son (his heir, Henry Arthur Hallam Farnaby Cator, later Lennard, born in 1859) and two daughters.

By 1861, his father had risen to the rank of Lieutenant-General and in 1865 was appointed a Knight Commander of the Order of the Bath. On April 1866, he was promoted to full General, following the death of General Frederick Campbell; he died at home, 6, Eaton Place, on 11 May, aged 81. An obituary noted that he had been commissioned in 1803.

After his second wife's death in 1888, in 1890 under his new name Lennard married thirdly Isabella, daughter of James Brand, of Bedford Hill House, Surrey.

Lennard had a younger brother, the Rev. William Albemarle Bertie Cator, born in 1820, who was educated at Merton College, Oxford, and for almost forty years was Rector of Carshalton. He died in October 1884, at Stone Court, Carshalton, leaving a substantial estate, valued for probate at £50,440, which is equivalent to £6,641,267 in 2023.

Lennard died on 27 December 1899. He left an estate valued at £21,333, less than half that of his younger brother.
