= Lennard baronets =

Set index for Lennard baronets

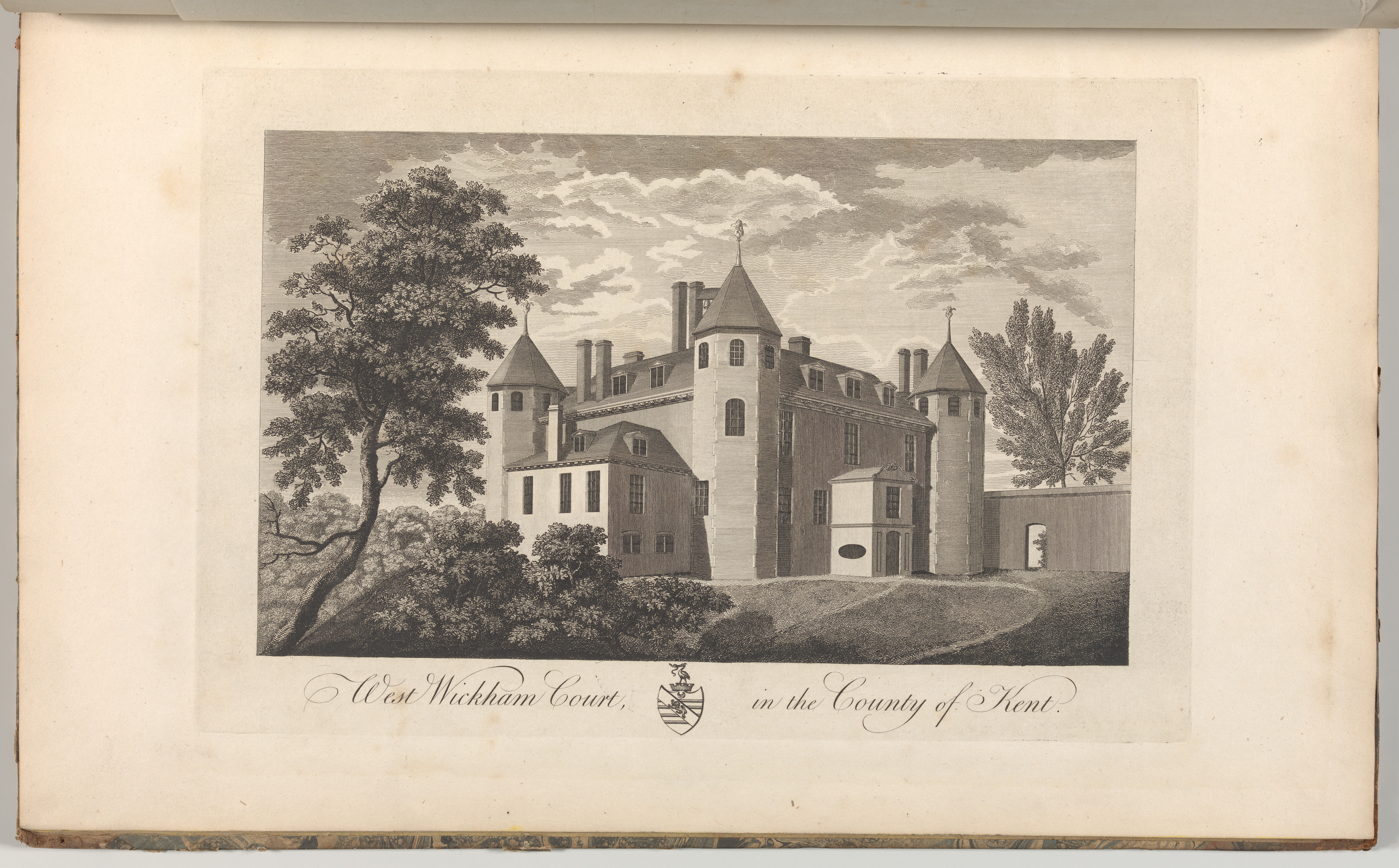
West Wickham Court

There have been two baronetcies created for persons with the surname Lennard, one in the Baronetage of England and one in the Baronetage of the United Kingdom. Both creations are extinct.

- Lennard baronets of West Wickham (1st creation, 1642)
- Lennard baronets of West Wickham (2nd creation, 1880)
