= Chris Hall =

Chris Hall may refer to:

- Chris Hall (English footballer) (born 1986), English television actor and retired footballer
- Chris Hall (Australian footballer) (born 1982), Australian rules footballer
- Chris Hall (cryptographer), American mathematician and cryptographer
- Chris Hall (lacrosse) (1950–2014), Canadian lacrosse player and coach
- Chris Hall (defensive back) (born 1970), American football defensive back
- Chris Hall (offensive lineman) (born 1987), American football offensive lineman
- Chris Hall (university president) (born 1956), English-American politician and academic
- Chris Hall (politician) (born 1985), Iowa state representative
- Chris Hall (racing driver), British auto racing driver
- Chris Hall (journalist), sports reporter and presenter for ITV regional news programme Granada Reports
- Chris Hall, former mayor of Colchester
- Christopher Hall (producer) (born 1957), TV producer

== See also ==
- Christopher Hall (disambiguation)
- Chrishall, a village in England
