= Colleen McCabe =

British fraudster and headteacher

Colleen McCabe (born 1952) is a former British schoolteacher, schoolmaster and former religious sister, who stole up to £500,000 from the school where she worked.

== Early years ==
From 1974 to 1989, McCabe was a member of the Daughters of Charity of Saint Vincent de Paul. After 15 years she decided to leave that community, and joined the faculty of the state-funded Roman Catholic St John Rigby School where she was made headteacher in 1991.

Before her extravagant spending was revealed, McCabe had been praised as a headmistress for her strong discipline in the school and for improving the school's facilities. She made the school grant-maintained in 1995, thus allowing the head to have complete control over the school's budget, having received the permission from the school's governors. The fraud was detected only after the school reverted to government control in 1999.

== Spending ==
McCabe spent money from the budget on clothes, shoes, jewellery, trips, takeaways and wine for the governors' meetings, champagne receptions and three holidays to Malta.

This was achieved with cutbacks, including:

- using her pupils and contract cleaners for cleaning
- shutting down the school heaters
- asking children to work with old textbooks and computers
- sacking, or underpaying, teachers.

== Conviction ==
McCabe was convicted of all eleven charges of theft and six charges of deception. She was originally jailed for five years, but this was reduced to four years on appeal. She was released in December 2005, after serving half of her sentence.

== Television ==
McCabe was portrayed by Pauline Quirke in the 2006 BBC Two docu-drama The Thieving Headmistress.
