= All Saints Catholic School, West Wickham =

All Saints Catholic School

Location
- Layhams Road; West Wickham, London, BR4 9HN; England
- 51°21′51″N 0°00′22″W

Information
- Religious affiliation: Roman Catholic
- Closed: 2007
- Local authority: Bromley
- Department for Education URN: 101677 Tables
- Ofsted: Reports
- Gender: Coeducational
- Age: 11 to 18

All Saints Catholic School was a Catholic secondary school located on Layhams Road, West Wickham, London Borough of Bromley. Formerly known as 'St. John Rigby Catholic College', its name was changed in 2004 as a rebranding because of falling pupil numbers and substantial debts following the departure of former headmistress Colleen McCabe.

The site was originally a teacher training college before opening as a school in 1979. It was an amalgamation of the former St Joseph's School for Boys, Orpington, itself a former Victorian orphanage, now a housing estate opposite Orpington Hospital and a girls' school.

Mr. Tranter was the first Deputy Headmaster.

The site is now being developed for housing.

== Fraud and closure ==
Colleen McCabe was convicted in 2003 of stealing around £500,000 from her school over a period from 1994 to 1999, which she spent lavishly both on herself and on gifts for her friends. The story was the subject of the 2006 BBC docudrama, The Thieving Headmistress. Money was diverted away from the school's budget resulting in the children being without books in a dirty, unheated school. The fraud was only detected when the school's grant maintained status was reverted and control was returned to the local education authority. McCabe was sentenced to five years in prison.

After a consultation period, in April 2006 Bromley Council approved the proposal to close the school with effect from August 2007.

== Notable former pupils ==
- Skream, DJ and producer
- Jason Puncheon, professional footballer
- Liam Fontaine, professional footballer
- Michael Carberry, cricketer
- James Dasaolu, athlete, 100m and 4×100m
- Craig Richards, professional boxer
