= Lennard baronets of West Wickham (1st creation, 1642) =

Escutcheon of the Lennard baronets of West Wickham

The Lennard baronetcy, of West Wickham in the County of Kent, was created in the Baronetage of England on 15 August 1642 for Stephen Lennard. He was son of Sir Samuel Lennard and his wife Elizabeth Slan(e)y, daughter of Stephen Slaney. He was three times married, his third marriage by 1635 being to Anne Oglander, sister of the Royalist William Oglander.

The 2nd Baronet sat as Member of Parliament for Winchelsea in 1681, and for Kent from 1698 to 1700, and from 1708 to 1709. The 3rd Baronet was Member of Parliament for Hythe from 1715 to 1727. The title became extinct on his death in 1727.

== Lennard baronets, of West Wickham (1642) ==
- Sir Stephen Lennard, 1st Baronet (c. 1604–1680)
- Sir Stephen Lennard, 2nd Baronet (1637–1709)
- Sir Samuel Lennard, 3rd Baronet (1672–1727)
