= Christopher Hall (cricketer) =

English cricketer (born 1977)

Personal information
- Full name: Christopher James Hall
- Born: 28 November 1977 (age 48); Bury, Greater Manchester, England
- Batting: Right-handed
- Bowling: Right-arm off break

Domestic team information
- Years: Team
- 1999–2001: Cheshire

Career statistics
| Competition | List A |
|---|---|
| Matches | 3 |
| Runs scored | 22 |
| Batting average | 11.00 |
| 100s/50s | –/– |
| Top score | 9* |
| Balls bowled | 120 |
| Wickets | 5 |
| Bowling average | 19.40 |
| 5 wickets in innings | – |
| 10 wickets in match | – |
| Best bowling | 3/38 |
| Catches/stumpings | 2/– |
- Source: Cricinfo, 10 April 2011

Christopher James Hall (born 28 November 1977) is a former English cricketer. Hall was a right-handed batsman who bowled right-arm off break. He was born in Bury, Greater Manchester.

Hall made his debut for Cheshire in the 1999 MCCA Knockout Trophy against the Lancashire Cricket Board. Hall played Minor counties cricket for Cheshire from 1999 to 2001, including 12 Minor Counties Championship matches and 3 MCCA Knockout Trophy matches. In 1999, he made his List A debut against the Surrey Cricket Board in the NatWest Trophy. He played two further List A matches for Cheshire, against Kent in the same competition and Lincolnshire in the 2000 NatWest Trophy. In his three List A matches, he scored 22 runs at a batting average of 11.00, with a high score of 9*. With the ball he took 5 wickets at a bowling average of 19.40, with best figures of 3/38.

He also played Second XI cricket for the Lancashire Second XI, Worcestershire Second XI, Surrey Second XI and Derbyshire Second XI.
