= Wickham Court =

Country house in West Wickham, England

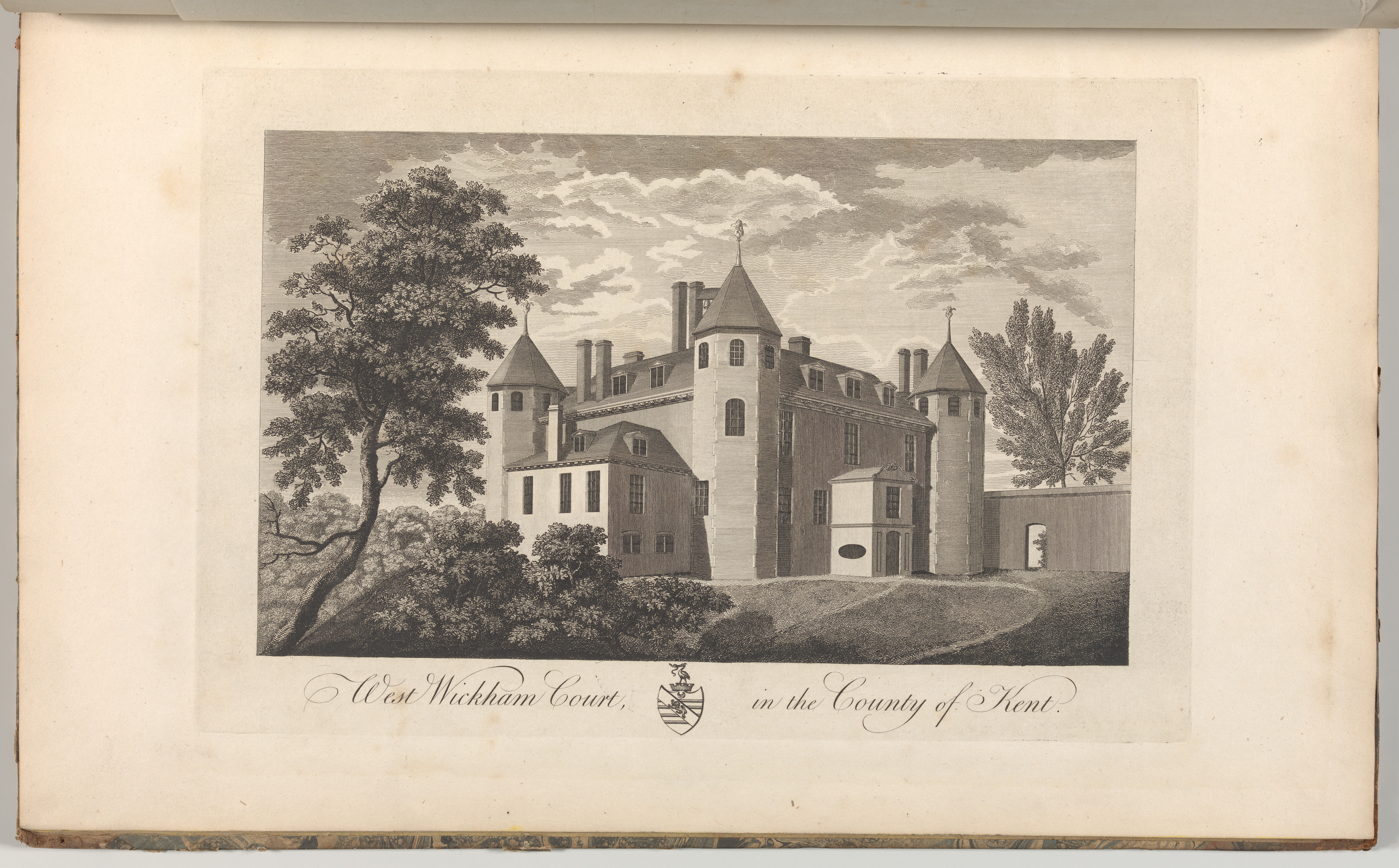
- Interactive map of the Wickham Court area

General information
- Type: Country House
- Location: West Wickham, Bromley, London
- Coordinates: 51.364869°N 0.004871°W
- Completed: Reign of Henry VII

Design and construction
- Designations: Grade I listed

Wickham Court is a semi-fortified country house in West Wickham, Bromley, a borough of south-east London and historically and traditionally part of the county of Kent. The house dates from the time of Henry VII and is a Grade I listed building.

The house is a square brick-built structure of 3 storeys which once enclosed a small open courtyard, since roofed over. There are octagonal 5-storey turrets at each corner and both the house and turrets have castellated parapets. The east front has 4 windows, the other fronts 3 windows. A porch with a crow-stepped gable was added to the west side during the reign of Charles I. A modern attic storey with dormer windows and a modern wing on the South front have also been added.

Since September 2023 this building has become a Coptic Orthodox Church, named St Mary and St John having moved from Dunbar Avenue Beckenham.

== History ==
The house was originally built for Sir Henry Heydon (died 1504) who married Anne Boleyn, the daughter of Sir Geoffrey Boleyn, great-grandfather of Henry VIII's wife Anne Boleyn. It was then sold by the Heydon family to John Lennard in 1579 and passed down in the Lennard family, many of whom were baronets, to 1929. In the 1890s, Sir John Farnaby Lennard, 1st Baronet, was Chairman of Kent County Council. In 1929 his heir Sir Stephen Lennard, Bt. emigrated to Canada, and Wickham Court became an hotel. It was requisitioned in the Second World War for use as Army offices and accommodation.

In 1952 it was acquired by Coloma College of Education (a teacher training establishment), and then from 1978 to 1996 occupied by Schiller International University. In 2003 it became home to Wickham Court Preparatory School. The school closed in 2023.
