= West Wickham =

Area of south-east London, England

Coordinates: 51.3765°N 0.0193°W

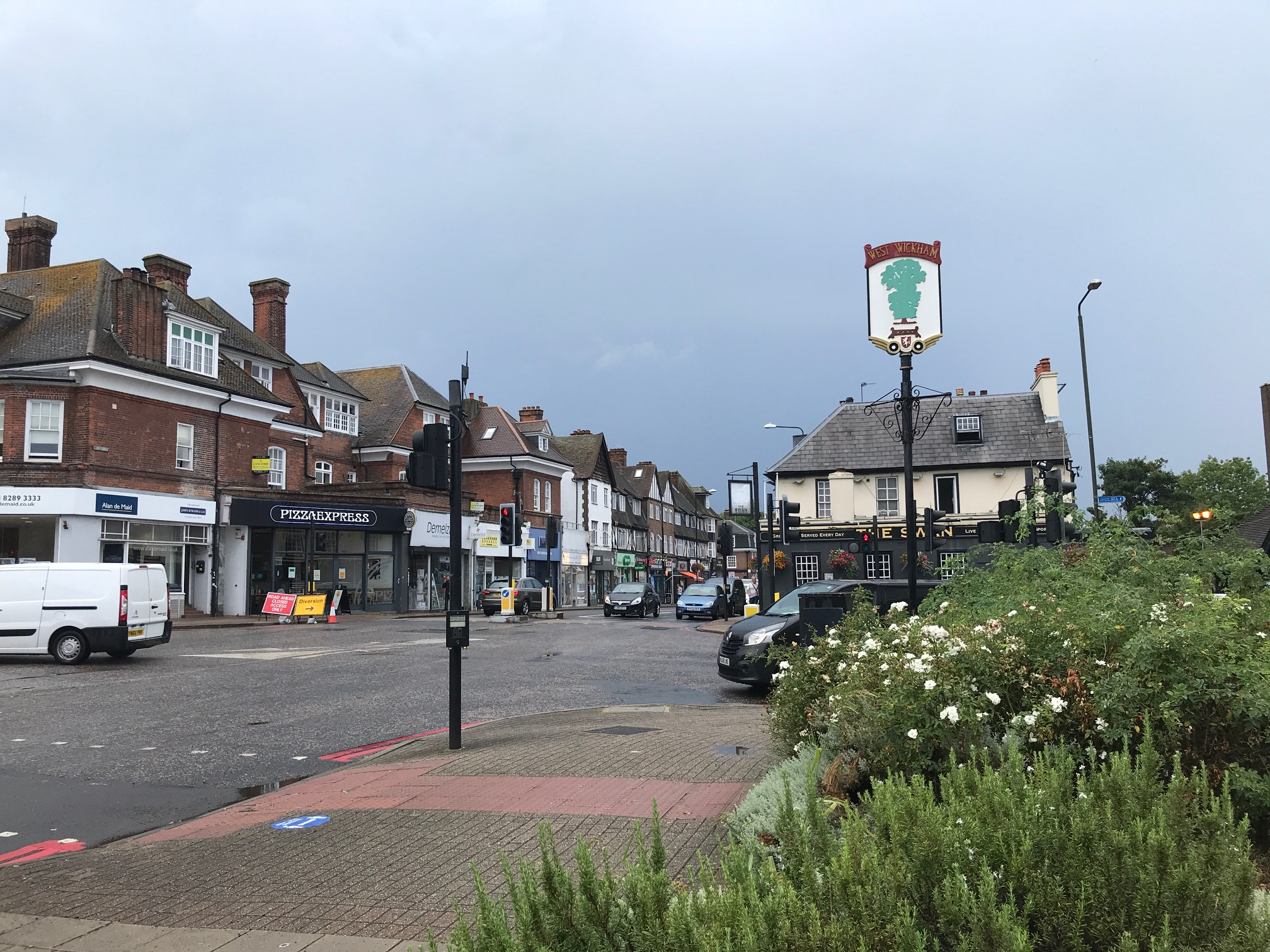
- West Wickham High Street

- Location within Greater London
- Population: 14,884 (ward, 2011)
- OS grid reference: TQ379660
  - Charing Cross: 10.3 mi (16.6 km) NW
- London borough: Bromley
- Ceremonial county: Greater London
- Region: London
- Country: England
- Sovereign state: United Kingdom
- Post town: WEST WICKHAM
- Postcode district: BR4
- Dialling code: 020
- Police: Metropolitan
- Fire: London
- Ambulance: London
- UK Parliament: Beckenham and Penge
- London Assembly: Bexley and Bromley

West Wickham is an area of south London, England, in the London Borough of Bromley. It lies south of Park Langley, Eden Park, Beckenham and Bromley town centre, west of Hayes and north of Coney Hall, east of Spring Park and Shirley. It is 10 miles (16 km) south-east of Charing Cross on the line of a Roman road, the London to Lewes Way. Before the creation of Greater London in 1965, West Wickham was in Kent.

== History ==
The Roman site near West Wickham, possibly an open-air market with slight long-term settlement, is probably the site of Noviomagus Cantiacorum.

West Wickham is mentioned in the Domesday Book of 1086 with the following entry: "In lordship 2 ploughs. 24 villagers have 4 ploughs. 13 slaves; a church; a mill at 20d.; a wood at 10 pigs. Value before 1066 8; later 6: now 13. Godric son of Karl held it from King Edward". The name dates to Anglo-Saxon and is possibly a corruption of the Latin vicus, denoting an earlier Roman settlement. The 'West' was added in the 13th century to differentiate it from East Wickham, situated some distance away to the north-east.

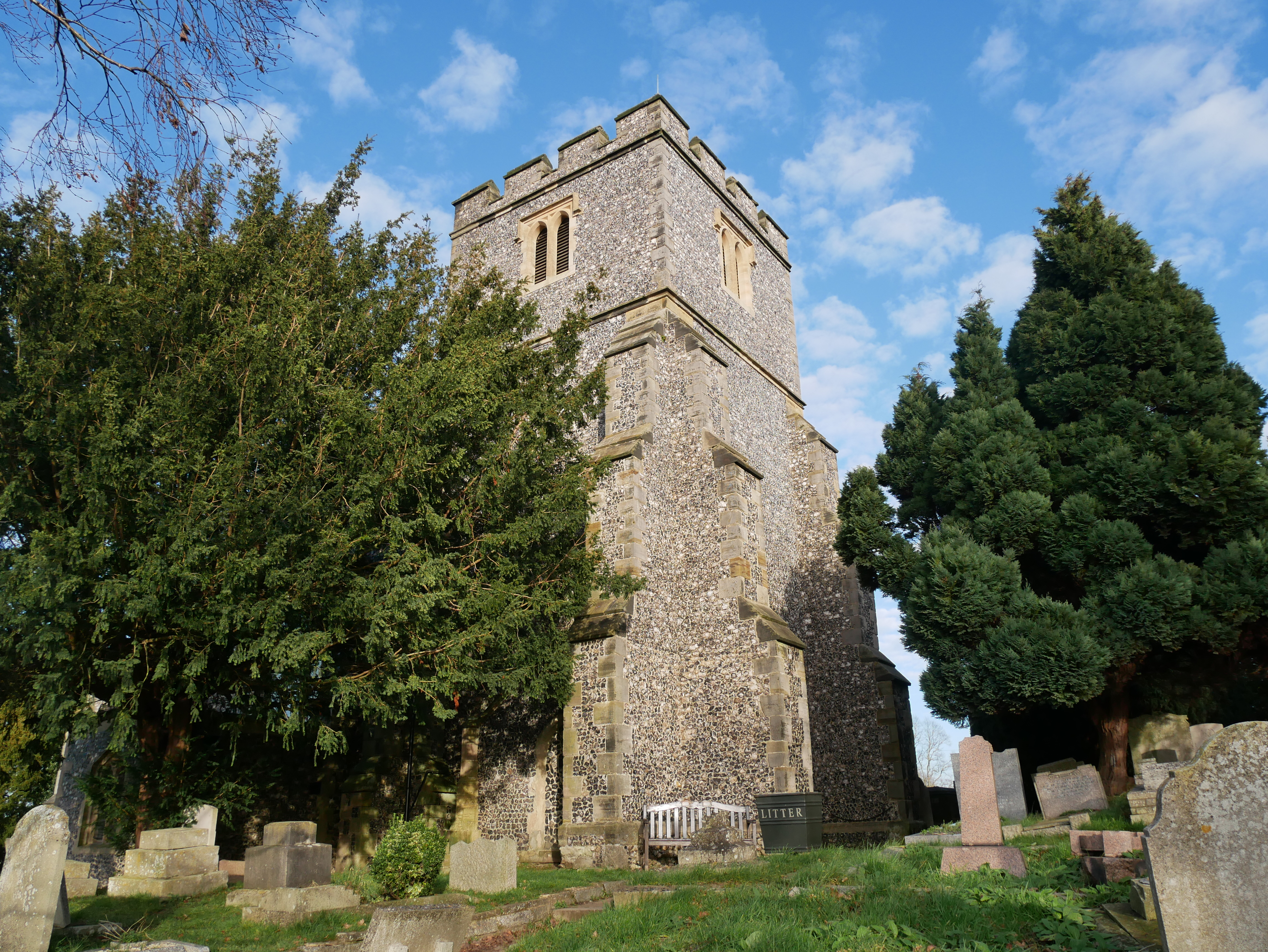
The medieval Church of Saint John the Baptist in West Wickham

In Tudor times, the manor house, Wickham Court, was expanded by the Boleyn family and the area was popular for deer hunting. The Grade I listed building was built by Sir Henry Heydon in 1469. His wife was Anne Boleyn (Bullen), a daughter of Sir Geoffrey Boleyn, who was Lord Mayor of London in 1469. She was the great-aunt of Queen Anne Boleyn, second wife of Henry VIII. The house was later sold to the Lennard family in 1580. In 1935, it was sold and adapted for use as an hotel. After World War II, it was sold to the Daughters of Mary and Joseph, an International Congregation of Religious Sisters, and became Coloma College (a teacher training college). This was run by the Daughters of Mary and Joseph until 1978. From 1978 to 1996 it was occupied by Schiller International University. It later became home to Wickham Court Preparatory School until 2023 and is now occupied by the St Mary and St John Coptic Orthodox & Centre.

Until the 1900s West Wickham remained a small village. The inter-war period saw rapid development and the transformation of the area into a suburb of London, facilitated by the arrival of the railway station, which opened in 1882. Much of the formerly extensive West Wickham Common was built over, though a small tract was purchased and preserved by the Corporation of London in 1892. At the crossroads by the Swan pub formerly stood the Stocks Tree, a large elm tree so named as it lay behind the village stocks. It was damaged during the laying down of sewerage pipes in the 1930s and was moved to Blake Recreation Ground in 1935, but later blew down in a storm. The tree is commemorated in the village sign and a plaque, both of which stand outside the library, with a piece of the tree on display inside.

Modern-day West Wickham is an affluent suburb of Greater London, after the London Government Act 1963, which came into effect in 1965, with West Wickham absorbed into the London Borough of Bromley. The area is a fairly typical London suburb, consisting of predominantly 1930s housing, with a row of shops, restaurants and a library along the High Street and another set around the train station area. There are four pubs in the area - The Swan and the Wheatsheaf on the High Street, The Railway by the station and The Real Ale Way micropub, opened in 2021 in Station Road. There are also several parks, such as West Wickham playing fields (McAndrews), Wickham Park and Blakes Recreation ground.

== Governance ==
West Wickham is part of the West Wickham ward which elects 3 councillors to Bromley London Borough Council.

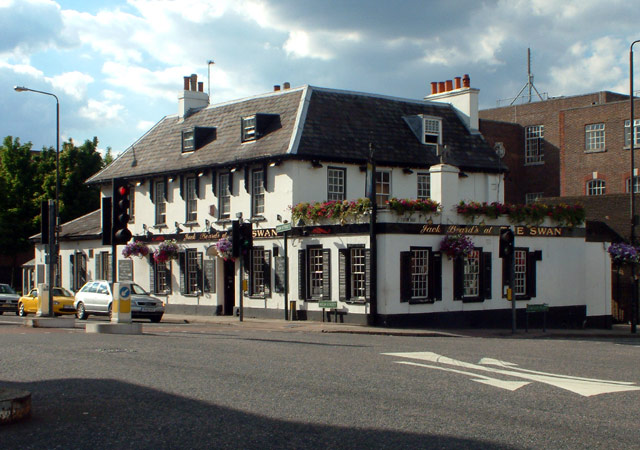
The Swan Public House, West Wickham, dating to circa 1840 and listed at grade II

On 1 April 1934 the civil parish was abolished and merged with Beckenham, Orpington and Bromley. At the 1931 census (the last before the abolition of the parish), West Wickham had a population of 6229.

== Education ==
West Wickham (including Coney Hall as it is a district of West Wickham) has four state schools (all primary schools). They are Oak Lodge, Wickham Common, Pickhurst and Hawes Down. St David's Prep and Wickham Court (serving as a nursery, primary school and secondary school) are private schools. In 2012, Wickham Common won a hockey gold medal when they represented Bromley in the London Youth Games.

There are no secondary schools in West Wickham, but there are some in neighbouring areas. Langley Park School for Boys and Langley Park School for Girls are located in Beckenham, Hayes School is located in Hayes, and Ravens Wood School is located in Keston.

All Saints' Catholic School was a secondary school located on Layhams Road, West Wickham, London Borough of Bromley which closed in 2007 a few years after a major fraud scandal.

== Transport ==
=== Rail ===
West Wickham railway station TfL travel card zone 5, serves the area with services to London Charing Cross, and Hayes.

=== Buses ===
West Wickham is served by several Transport for London buses connecting it with areas including Beckenham, Bromley, Croydon, Hayes, Penge, Sydenham and Thornton Heath. Services include routes, 119 (which runs 24/7), 138, 194 and 352. While Superloop London Superloop SL5 does not stop in West Wickham it stops near to the town's boundary at both Westmoreland Road, BR2 and Bethlem Royal Hospital, BR3.

== Sport and leisure ==
West Wickham has a non-League football club Glebe F.C. who play at Oakley Road.

West Wickham is home to GF Team Brazilian jiu-jitsu martial art centre at 11-13 Ravenswood Crescent, BR4 0JH.

West Wickham is home to Beccehamians RFC a rugby union club founded in 1933 which plays competitive rugby at Sparrows Den at the bottom of Corkscrew Hill.

Other clubs nearby include Croydon RFC (formerly Shirley Wanderers), a club that currently competes in Surrey 1, that has a rugby pitch used often for county matches.

West Wickham is well served by green spaces, including Spring Park and Sparrows Den, which are connected to Threepenny Woods. The London Loop walking trail and cycling track go through here. Kelsey Park in the Langley area of neighbouring Beckenham is also considered a local park, as is Addington Park.

== Arts and popular culture ==
Since 1958 the area has had an Arts association and since 1967 it has had its own community theatre known as Theatre 62 / West Wickham Theatre centre.

On 1 August 1964, Blakes Recreation Ground hosted a concert featuring Manfred Mann (featuring Paul Jones), The Merseybeats and the Johnny Dankworth Orchestra.

The town appeared in the 2000 UK television series The 1940s House, with 17 Braemar Gardens taking the starring role as a family lived a World War II experience in a typical London suburb.

== Notable people ==
- Nigel Farage (born 1964) was educated at Greenhayes School in West Wickham, the school on Corkscrew Hill closed in 1999
- Andy Roe (Born 1974) Former London Fire Commissioner, and Incident Commander during the Grenfell Tower Fire later Baron Roe of West Wickham.
- Thomas Carew (1595 at West Wickham – 1640) an English poet, among the 'Cavalier' group.
- Henry Hake Seward (c. 1778 – 19 January 1848), architect, buried at St John the Baptist church.
- William Burnside (born 1852), mathematician, buried in West Wickham parish church.
- Violet Cressy-Marcks (1895–1970), explorer, born and grew up in West Wickham.
- Alan Ridout (born 1934) - composer, born in West Wickham.
- Gordon Fergus-Thompson (born 1952), pianist.
- Stephen Dillane (born 1957), actor, grew up in West Wickham.
- Judy Oakes (born 1958), athlete.
- Charlie Heather (born 1964), drummer in The Levellers.
- Simon Haynes (born 1967), author, grew up in West Wickham.
- Annie Lyons - Author of the character "Eudora Honeysett"
- Chris Philp (born 1976), Conservative politician, grew up in West Wickham.
- Michael Carberry (born 1980), cricketer, attended St John Rigby College.
- Skream (born 1986), DJ & producer, grew up in West Wickham.

== Gallery ==
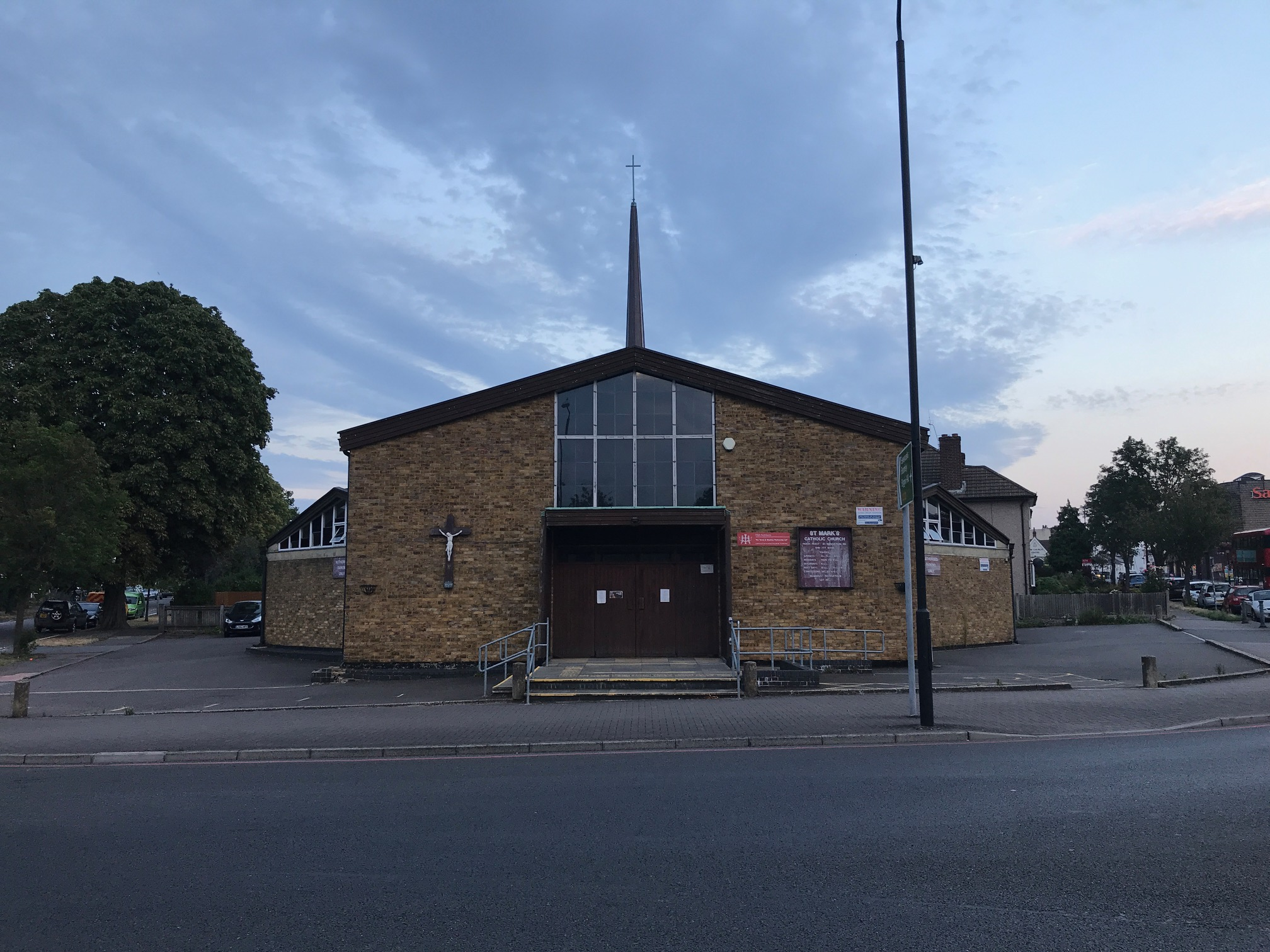
St Mark's Catholic Church, built 1962-63

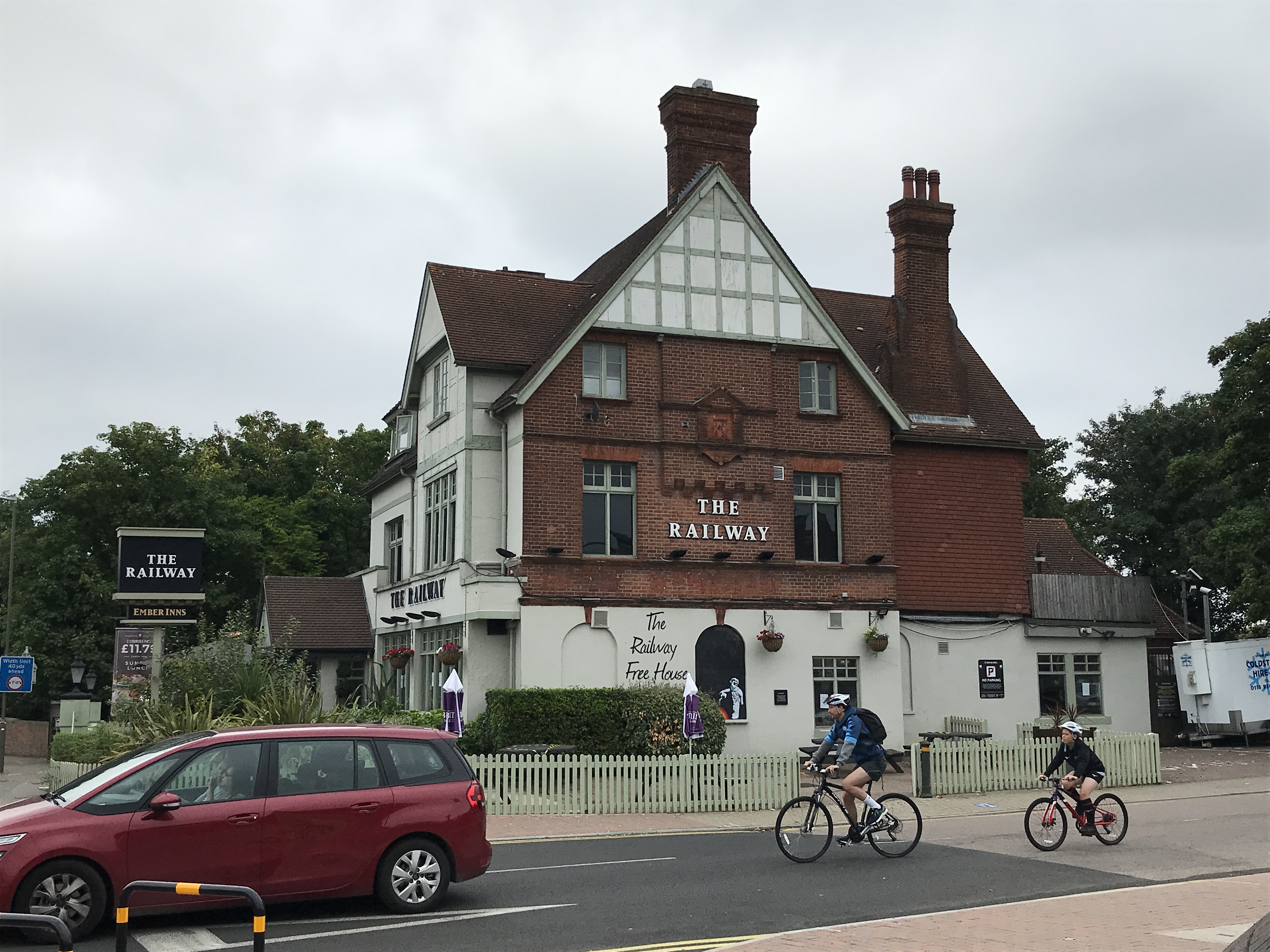
The Railway pub

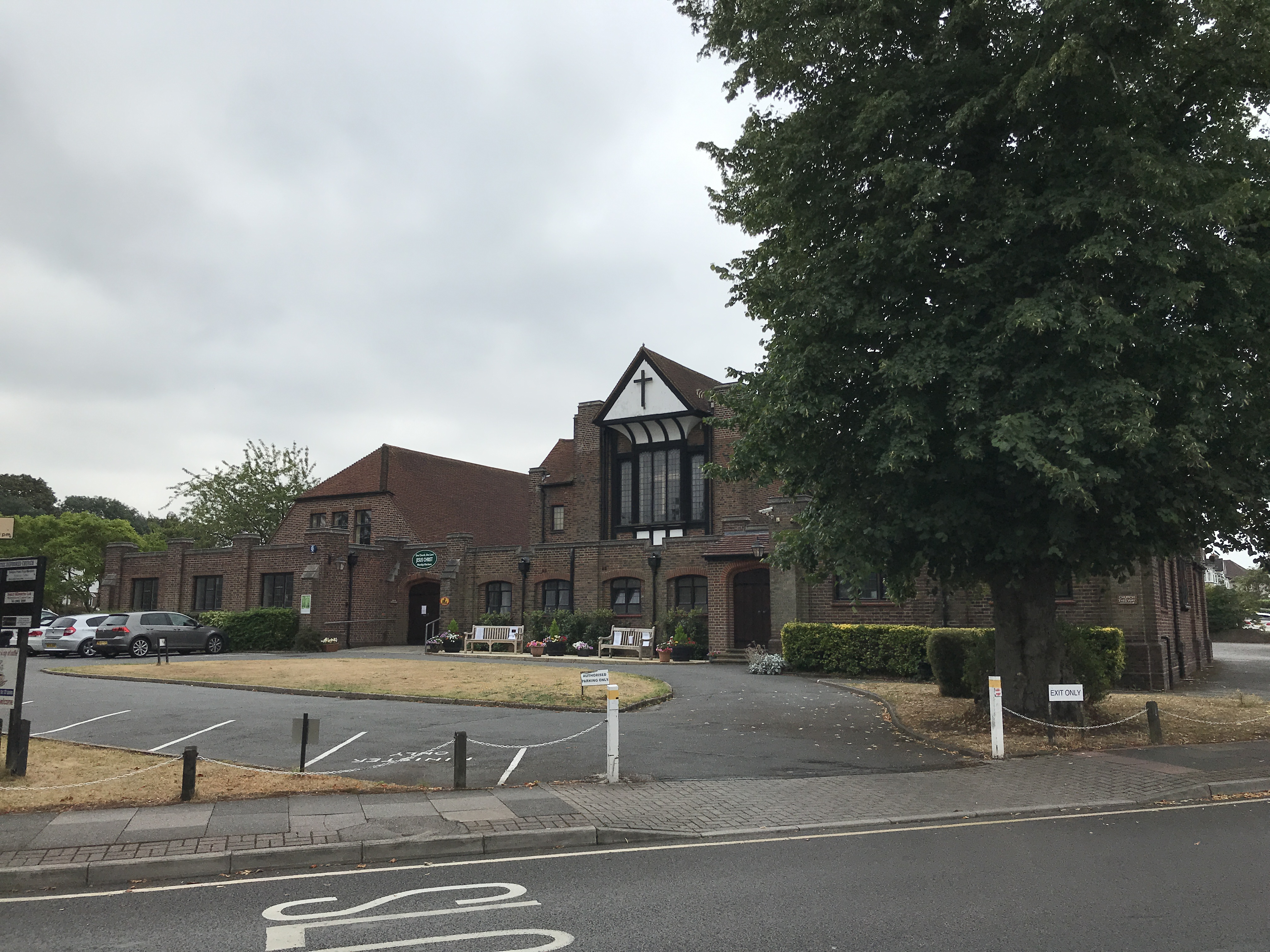
Emmanuel United Reformed Church

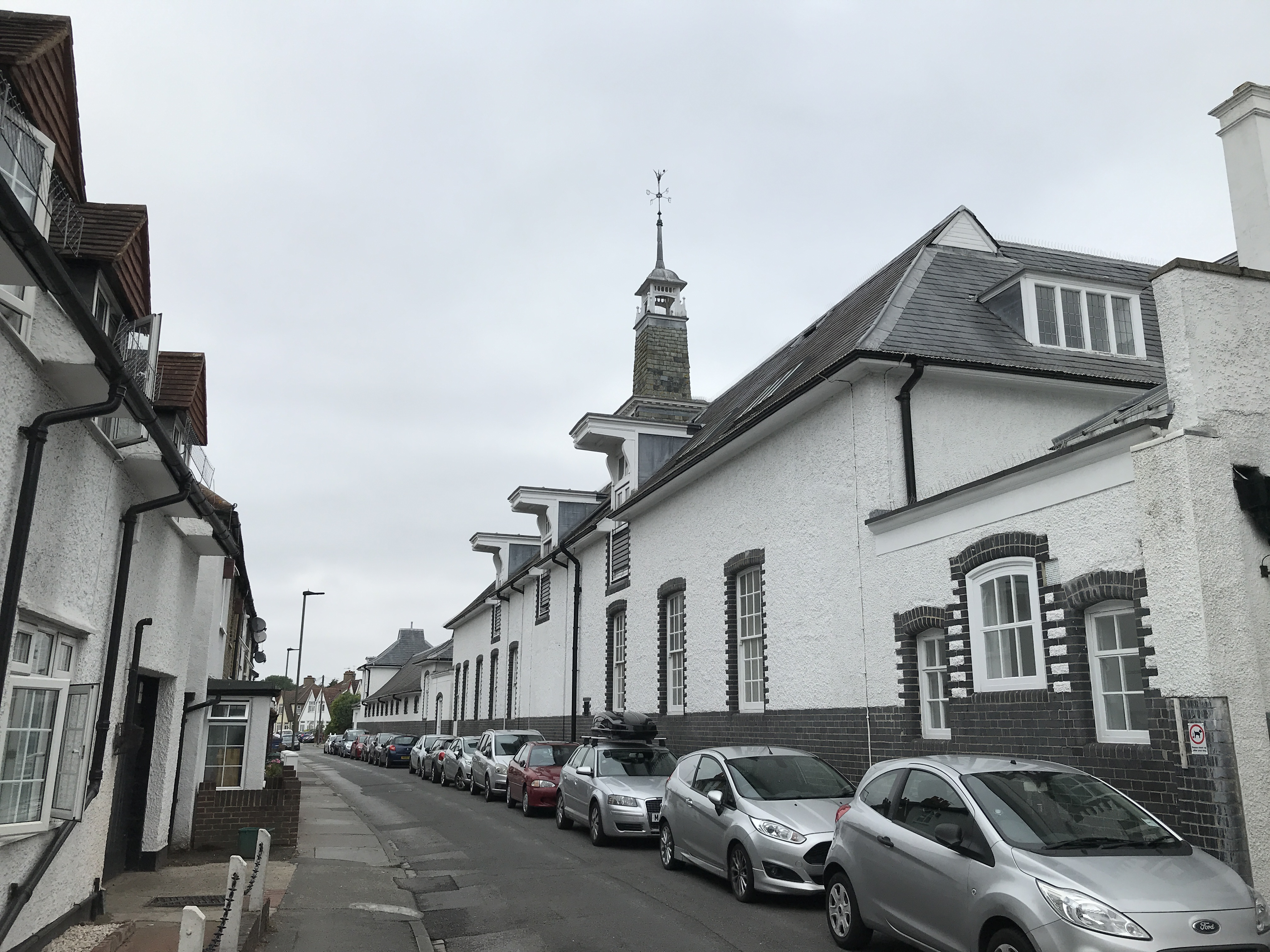
Old Unigate Dairies on Kent Road, built circa 1890 and now listed at grade II

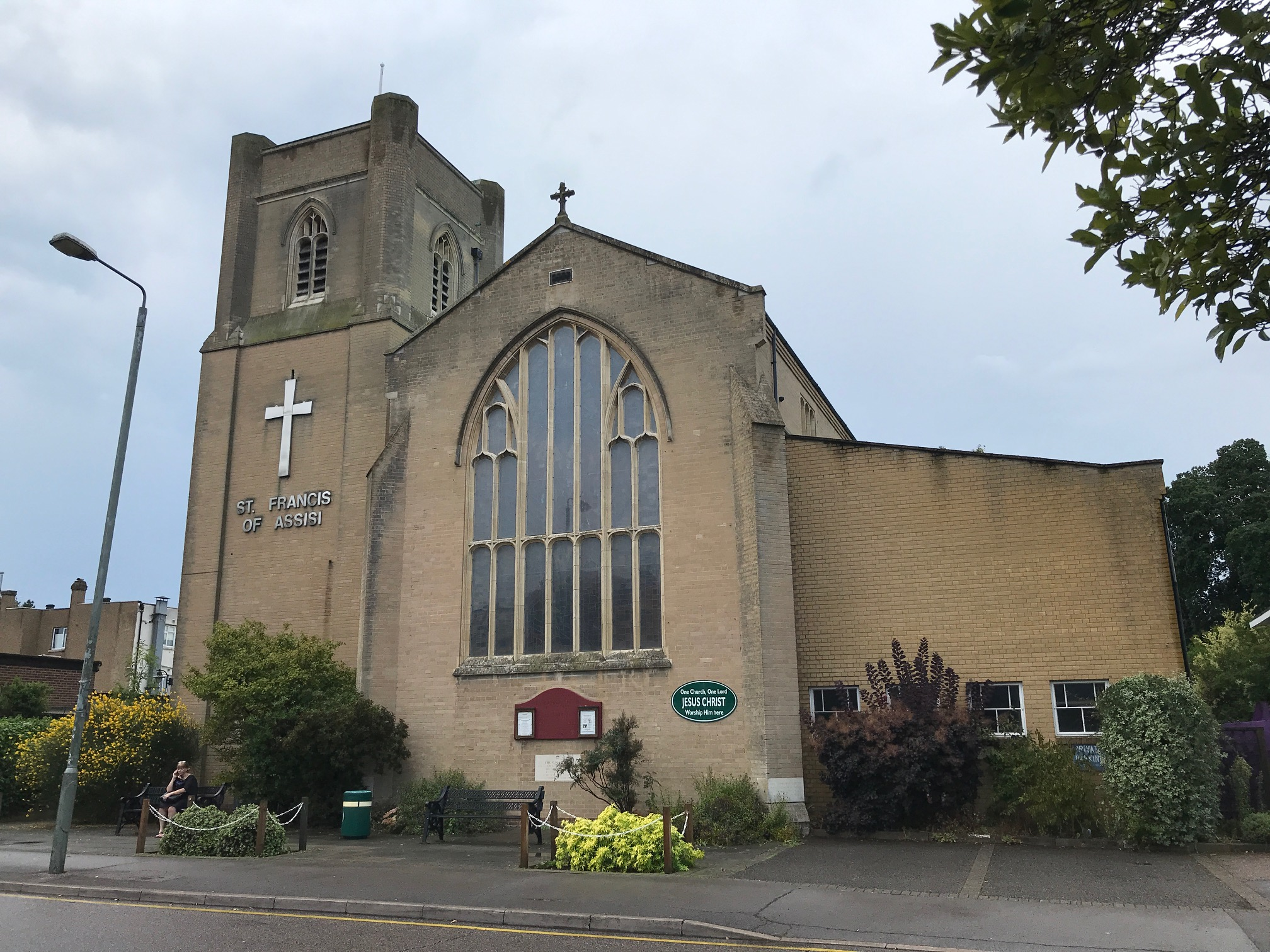
St Francis of Assisi Anglican Church on Ravenswood Avenue, built 1935-36

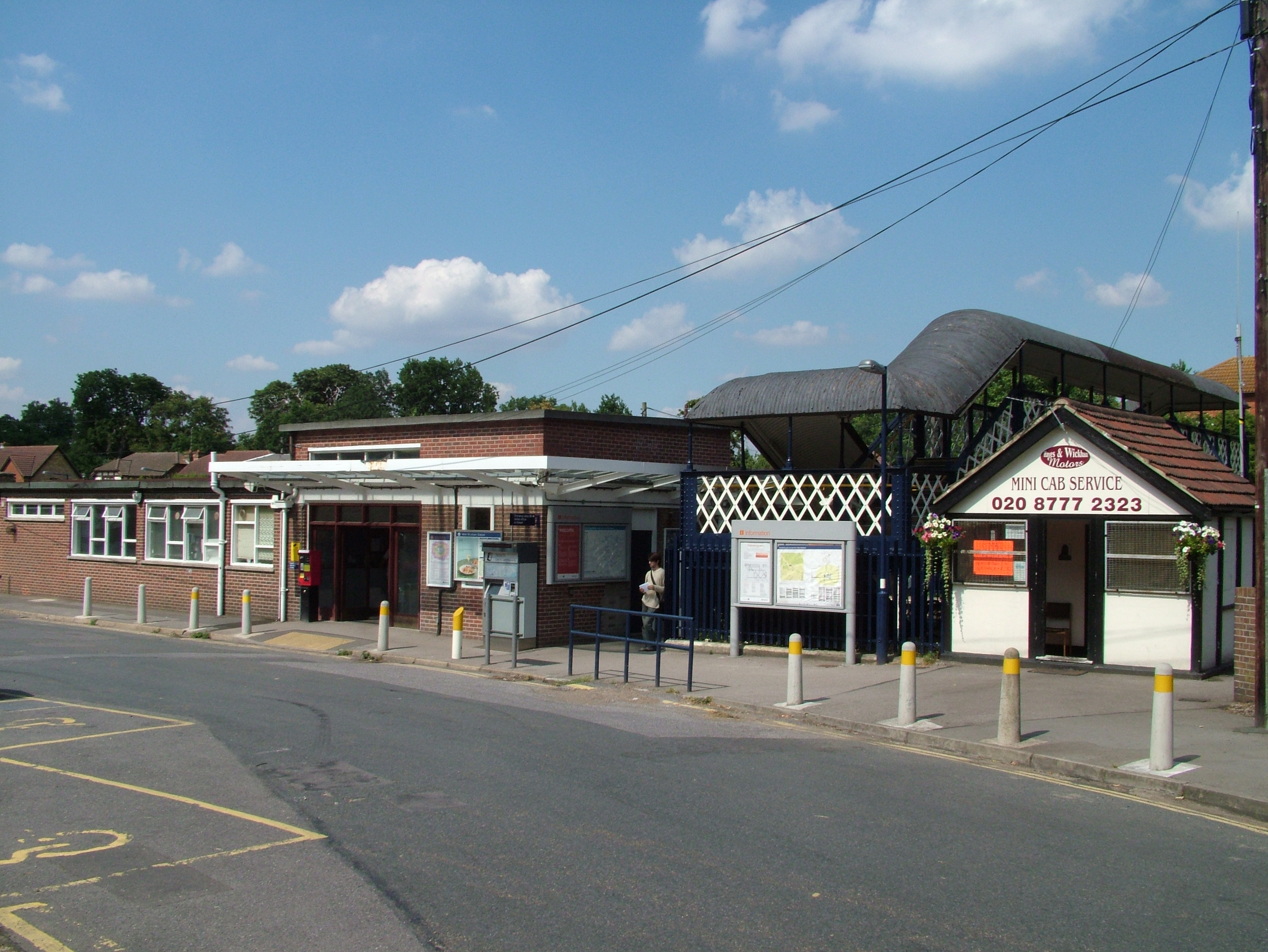
Entrance to the West Wickham train station
